= Al-Khatib =

Al-Khatib, El-Khatib or Al-Khateeb (Arabic: الخطيب) is a surname. Notable people with the surname include:

== Surname ==
- Abdallah Al-Khatib (born 1989), Syrian filmmaker
- Abdelkrim al-Khatib (1921–2008), Moroccan surgeon, politician and activist
- Abdelilah al-Khatib (born 1953), Jordanian politician
- Ahmed Al Khateeb (born 1965), Saudi Arabian bureaucrat
- Ahmad Al-Khatib (born 1995), Jordanian chess grandmaster
- Ahmad al-Khatib (1933–1982), Syrian politician
- Ahmad Shafik Al-Khatib (1926–2015), Palestinian-Lebanese lexicographer
- Ahmed Fouad Alkhatib (born 1990), Palestinian American activist
- Ali El-Khatib (born 1989), Palestinian footballer
- Anwar al-Khatib (1910–1970), Palestinian politician
- Bahij al-Khatib (1895–1981), Syrian politician
- Basil Al-Khatib (born 1962), Syrian director
- Bassam Al-Khatib (born 1975), Jordanian professional footballer
- Dania Khatib (born 1973), Lebanese singer
- Dima Khatib (born 1971), Palestinian-Syrian Qatari journalist
- Djelloul Khatib (1936–2017), Algerian combatant and public servant
- Esmaeil Khatib (1961–2026), Iranian cleric and politician
- Fadi El Khatib (born 1979), Lebanese basketball player
- Firas Al-Khatib (born 1983), Syrian footballer
- Ghassan Khatib (born 1954), Palestinian politician
- Hamza Al-Khatib (1997–2011), Syrian child who died in the Ba'athist Syrian government in Daraa
- Hanni El Khatib (born 1981), American singer-songwriter
- Hisham Khatib (1936–2022), Jordanian politician, engineer, and art collector
- Ibtihal Al-Khatib (born 1972), Kuwaiti academic, journalist, and activist
- Ibn al-Khatib (1313–1374), Arab historical figure
- Iyad Mohammad al-Khatib (born 1974), Syrian politician
- Kinda El-Khatib (born 1996/7), Lebanese activist
- Layla Al-Khatib (2023–2025), Palestinian toddler killed by Israel in Gaza war
- Magda El-Khatib (1943–2006), Egyptian actress
- Mahasen al-Khateeb (1993–2024), Palestinian artist killed by Israel in Gaza war
- Mahmoud El Khatib (born 1954), Egyptian retired footballer
- Moaz al-Khatib (born 1960), Syrian politician
- Mohamed Sami El-Khatib (born 1936), Egyptian sports shooter
- Mounzer Khatib (born 1936), Syrian sports shooter
- Muhammad Mukhtar Al-Khatib (born 1942), Sudanese communist
- Muhammad Nabil Al Khatib, Syrian politician
- Muhib Al Din Al Khatib (1886–1969), Syrian journalist and politician
- Nimr al-Khatib (1918–2010), Palestinian political leader
- Oussama Khatib (born 1950), Syrian-American roboticist
- Oliver El-Khatib (born 1982), Nordic-Lebanese Canadian producer
- Raghda Khateb (born 1978), Syrian actress and voice actress
- Ruhi al-Khatib (1914–1994), Mayor of Jerusalem
- Samira Alkhatib (1945–2021), Palestinian poet
- Tawfik Khatib (born 1954), Israeli Arab politician
- Youcef Khatib (1932–2023), Algerian doctor and military officer
- Zaher el-Khatib (born 1940), Lebanese politician
- Zaki al-Khatib (1887–1961), Syrian politician

== See also ==
- Khatib
- Al-Katib
- Khatib (surname)
