= Al-Futuwwa (Palestine) =

1935–1948 youth organisation of the Palestine Arab Party

Al-Futuwwah (Arabic: فتوة - "The Youth" or "The Brotherhood") was the youth organisation of the Palestine Arab Party in Palestine. The organisation was created in February 1936 by the al-Husseinis to counteract their rivals' al-Nashashibis National Defense Party. It was, to some extent, modelled on the Hitler Youth organisation in Germany.

== Origins ==
The Palestine Arab Party was founded at a congress in March 1935, when Jamal al-Husayni was elected president. One of the tasks pursued by the heads of the Party was to create a youth branch; scouts of young Palestinians who participated in the political feuds of the time. This was actively pursued by the General Secretary Emil Ghuri, who at first tried to work through the Boy Scouts, later creating a separate organisation. For a short time they called themselves the "Nazi Scouts" and then renamed it to al-Futuwwah, meaning 'chivalry' in Arabic.

At the founding meeting on February 11, 1936, Jamal al-Husayni noted that Hitler's followers had grown in number from six to six hundred to sixty million and expressed the hope that al-Futuwwah would also be a nucleus of national resurrection. The following credo was adopted:

Liberty is my right; Independence is my goal; Arabism is my principle; Palestine is my country and mine only. This I attest and God is a witness to my words.

== Later developments ==
Al-Futuwwa was broken up by the British in 1937 during the Arab Revolt. It was re-established in September 1946 and Kamil Arikat was made its commander. Its main task was to support the leadership of Jamal al-Husayni by opposing al-Najjada. Its members wore uniforms and had superficial military training, with estimates of their strength ranging from 2,000 to 5,000, not existing as a significant force in the Palestinian political sphere. An official merger of al-Futuwwa and al-Najjada was announced later that year, but in practice they continued to operate separately. For al-Najjada and al-Futuwwa, by the summer of 1947 they were already dispersed as any serious militant organization.
