= Al-Katib =

Al-Katib or al-Katib (Arabic: الكاتب) is an Arabic surname that denotes a relationship to a Katib. Notable people with the surname include:

- Abd al-Hamid al-Katib (died 749), Medieval Arabic-language writer
- Al-Hasan al-Katib (d. 11th century), Egyptian Sufi saint
- Ibrahim ibn Wahb al-Katib (10th-century), scholar of the Abbasid Caliphate
- Marjan al-Katib al-Islami (17th century), Iranian calligrapher
- Muhammad ibn Sulayman al-Katib (died after 905), senior official and commander of the Abbasid Caliphate
- Yunus al-Katib al-Mughanni (8th-century), Persian-language poet

== See also ==
- Al-Khatib
