= Khatib (surname) =

Khatib or Khatib is a surname that may refer to:

- Anwar Khatib (1917–1993), Palestinian politician
- Dima Khatib (born 1971), Palestinian journalist, poet and translator
- Esmaeil Khatib (1961–2026), Iranian cleric and politician
- Ghassan Khatib (born 1954), Palestinian politician
- Hassan Rajab Khatib (born 1946), Tanzanian politician
- Lina Khatib (born 1977), Lebanese professor, essayist and commentator
- Muhammed Seif Khatib (1951–2021), Tanzanian politician
- Sadia Khateeb (born 1997), Indian actress
- Sulaiman Khateeb (1922–1978), Indian poet

== See also ==
- Al-Khatib
