= Palestine Arab Party =

1935–1948 political party in Palestine

Palestinian Arab Party
- Founder: Jamal al-Husayni
- Founded: May 1935; 91 years ago
- Dissolved: 1948; 78 years ago
- Newspaper: Al Jamia Al Arabiya
- Youth wing: Al-Futuwwa
- Ideology: Palestinian nationalism Arab nationalism Anti-Zionism; Pan-Arabism; Social conservatism Anti-Nashashibi
- Political position: Right-wing

The Palestinian Arab Party (Arabic: الحزب العربي الفلسطيني ‘Al-Hizb al-'Arabi al-Filastini) was a political party in Palestine established in May 1935 by the influential Husayni family. Jamal al-Husayni was the founder and chairman. Emil Ghuri was elected general secretary until the end of the British Mandate in 1948. Other leaders of the party included Saed al-dean Al-Aref, Rafiq al-Tamimi, Tawfiq al-Husayni, Anwar al-Khatib, Kamil al-Dajani, and Yusuf Sahyun.

== History ==
The party was set up after the rival Nashashibi family established their National Defence Party. Other parties at the time included the pan-Arabist Youth Congress Party and the Independence Party (Hizb al-Istiqlal al-'Arabi, also known as the Arab Istiqlal Party), as well as the Reform Party and the National Bloc, established by public activists on a personal and local basis, and the National Liberation League in Palestine, an organization founded by the Palestine Communist Party.

The objectives of the party were independence for Palestine, an end of the Mandate, the preservation of the Arab majority in the country, opposition to Zionism, and closer relations between Palestine and other Arab countries. It was the largest of the Arab political parties formed in Palestine during the 1930s. The first official newspaper of the party was Al Jamia Al Arabiya.

Abd al-Qadir al-Husayni was a member of the party and served as secretary-general. He also became editor-in-chief of the party's paper Al Liwaa and other newspapers, including Al Jamia Al Arabiya.

Jamal al-Husayni represented the party on the Arab Higher Committee (AHC), which was formed on 25 April 1936, during the 1936-39 Arab revolt. Following the violence and assassinations instigated by the various Palestinian nationalist parties and the AHC in mid-1937, the British authorities outlawed the AHC in October 1937 and commenced to roundup its leaders, some of whom were deported to the Seychelles. Jamal al-Husayni escaped to Syria, as did Abd al-Qadir al-Husayni. They, as well as Amin al-Husayni, were involved in the 1941 pro-Nazi Rashidi revolt in Iraq. Jamal was captured by the British and interned in Southern Rhodesia, where he was held until November 1945 when he was allowed to move to Cairo.

In 1942, during Jamal's incarceration, the party was re-established with Saleh al-Husayni, Jamal's brother, as acting president, and Emil Ghuri, a Christian, as secretary.

== Bibliography ==
- Gelber, Yoav (1997). Jewish-Transjordanian Relations 1921-48: Alliance of Bars Sinister. London: Routledge. ISBN 0-7146-4675-X
- Pappé, Ilan (2003). History of Modern Palestine: One Land, Two Peoples. Cambridge: Cambridge University Press. ISBN 0-521-55632-5
