= Emile Touma =

Palestinian historian (1919–1985)

- إميل توما
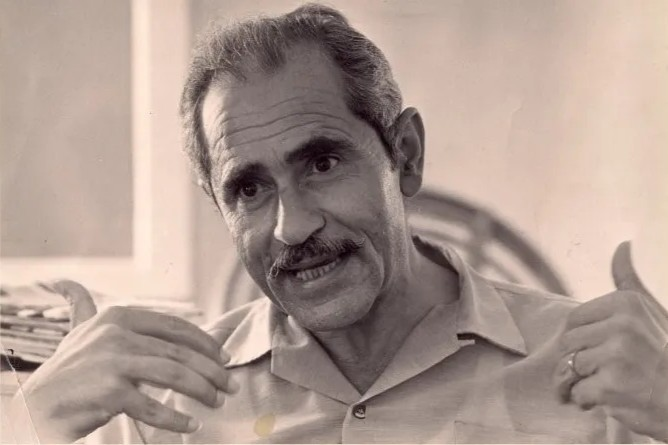

Editor-in-chief of Al-Ittihad
- In office 1949–1985

Personal details
- Born: 16 March 1919 Haifa, Mandatory Palestine
- Died: 27 August 1985 (aged 66) Haifa, Israel
- Party: Palestine Communist Party, National Liberation League in Palestine, Communist Party of Israel
- Spouse: Chaia Karberg
- Education: St. George's School, Cambridge University
- Profession: Political historian, journalist, theorist

Emile Touma (Arabic: إميل توما, Hebrew: אמיל תומא; 16 March 1919 – 27 August 1985), was a Palestinian and Israeli Arab political historian, journalist and theorist. He was a leader of the Palestine Communist Party.

== Early life and education ==
Emile was born in Haifa to a wealthy Orthodox Christian family in 1919. He attended the Orthodox School in Haifa, then went to Jerusalem to the Bishop Gobat's School to complete his high school studies. He enrolled in Cambridge University but left it in 1939 when World War II started.

== Career ==
In 1939, he joined the Palestine Communist Party which would be later led by him and Fuad Nassar. In 1944 Touma, Fuad Nassar and Emile Habibi established a new newspaper, Al-Ittihad, which published its first edition on 14 May 1944.

In January 1947, Touma travelled to a conference of Communist parties of the British Empire in London, where he argued against partition of Palestine. He was arrested in Lebanon in 1948. In 1949 he returned to Haifa and continued working as editor-in-chief of Al-Ittihad.

In 1965 he joined the Institute for Oriental Studies of the Academy of Sciences in Moscow where he got his PhD in History for his dissertation on Arab nationalism, "The March of the Arab Peoples and the Problems of Arab Unity" ("مسيرة الشعوب العربية ومشاكل الوحدة العربية")

In 1942, along with Dr. Haidar Abdel-Shafi, and the late Mukhlis Amer, Habibi and Mufid Nashashibi, Touma was a founder of the Palestinian National Liberation League. He wrote 15 books and hundreds of articles about politics, history and culture.

== Personal life ==
Touma was married to the artist Chaia Touma (née Karberg), an Israeli ceramic artist of Moldovan-Jewish background.

== Commemoration ==
- The Emile Touma Institute for Palestinian and Israeli Studies, established in 1986, is named for him.
- In 2004 a street was named for him in Haifa's Wadi Nisnas.
