= Al-Najjada =

Palestinian Arab paramilitary scout movement

Al-Najjada النجادة
- General Commander: Muhammad al-Hawari
- Secretary General: Rashad al-Dabbagh
- Founded: 8 December 1945
- Dates active: 1945–1947
- Dissolved: Late December 1947
- Headquarters: Jaffa, Palestine
- Ideology: Arab nationalism Pan-Arabism; Anti-Zionism
- Size: 8,000 (1946); 3,000 (1947)

al-Najjada (Arabic: النجادة, or Munazzamat al-Najjada al-Falastiniyya) was a Palestinian Arab paramilitary scout movement formed in Jaffa, British Mandate of Palestine on 8 December 1945. The organisation was headed by Muhammad Nimr al-Hawari as General Commander (al-Harawi had served in the British Mandate administration) and Rashad al-Dabbagh as Secretary General. The al-Najjada HQ was on Railway Station Street Jaffa. Its officers were mainly Arabs who had served in the British Army. During the lead into the 1948 war its membership numbered 2,000 to 3,000 but the organisation lacked arms. The Palestinian Arab revolt of 1936–1939 led to an imbalance of power between the Jewish community and the Arab community, as the latter had been substantially disarmed. The British had estimated al-Najjada strength as 8,000 by mid-1946.

The inaugural proclamation of 8 December published in al-Difa’a read:-

1. al-Najjada is a national institution, the aim of which is to unite the youth and rally together, to arouse a national consciousness among them, to train them to obedience and discipline, as well as to link Palestine to its sister countries in a bond of unity that would guarantee the Arab a dignified and full life among nations of the globe as on their part they [the youth] spread the message of Arabism, Liberty, Fraternity and Equality.
2. al-Najjada considers Palestine an Arab country enjoying the rights and sharing the responsibility of the rest of the Arab countries
3. al-Najjada considers the Zionist movement as the most heinous crime known to history, seeing it rests on the principle of aggression and is sustained by animosity, having for its exponent first rate confederates in crime against all humanity.
4. al-Najjada bans and forbids regional bigotry, tribal and ideological zealotry.

al-Najjada had 11 branches: Jaffa as HQ, Haifa, Acre, Nablus, Beersheba, Tiberias, Jerusalem Tulkarem, Gaza, Majdal and Nazareth. Each branch was subdivided into companies troops and patrols. Al-Najjada was particularly active in Southern Palestine. It was pledged to assist Palestinian society through the improvement of the “educational and moral standards” of Arab youth." Training in al-Najjada consisted of; drilling, physical training, elementary military training (particularly rifle shooting) and indoctrination lectures on Arab nationalist ideology and Arab nationalism. Al-Hawari attempted to model the Najjada on the Haganah, but in practice its primary activity consisted of noisy parades in town squares; there was little if any military activity at all. al-Najjada along with al-Futawa was seen as a potential nucleus of a disciplined Palestinian Arab national para-military organisation.

A three-person investigative committee was formed in October 1946 with Rafiq al-Tamimi (chairperson), Emil al-Ghury and al-Hawari, when after the 1946 Jaffa parade, Jamal al-Husseini insisted that the Palestinian Arab Youth organisations were to come under the direct control of the Palestine Arab Party (PAP). When the fusion of Husseini's al-Futuwa and al-Najjada was proposed arbitration was sought through Amin al-Husseini. The amalgamation was stalled when the al-Najjada membership raised a series of legal, financial and administrative arguments against the merger in an attempt to deter the investigative committee from completing the synthesis of the youth organisations.

During the lead into the 1947 civil war in Mandatory Palestine, al-Hawari was in command of the local militia in the defence of Jaffa until he fled to Ramallah in late December 1947. Morris comments that al-Hawari was suspected to be a HIS informant. al-Hawari had indeed met and discussed an agreement for Jaffa with Ezra Danin. "Drawing the self-evident conclusion", he left for Egypt where Amin al-Husseini prevented his return and subsequently gained the control of Jaffa. Nevertheless, in the process "al-Najjada [organisation] was destroyed," and the Palestinian Arab leadership entered the 1948 Palestine War without a national militia.

== See also ==
- Gadna, youth movement affiliated to the Haganah, and to the Israel Defense Forces after 1948.
- Betar, youth movement affiliated to the Irgun, and to the Likud after 1948.

== Bibliography ==
- Yoav Gelber (2006) Palestine 1948, Sussex Academic Press, ISBN 978-1-84519-075-0
- Issa Khalaf (1991) Politics in Palestine: Arab Factionalism and Social Disintegration, 1939-1948 SUNY Press ISBN 0-7914-0707-1
- Haim Levenberg (1993) "Military preparations of the Arab community in Palestine, 1945-1948: 1945-1948" Routledge ISBN 0-7146-3439-5
- Benny Morris (2004) Birth of the Palestinian Refugee Problem Revisited, Cambridge University Press, ISBN 0-521-00967-7
- Morris, Benny (2008). 1948 : a history of the first Arab-Israeli war. New Haven: Yale University Press. ISBN 978-0-300-12696-9.
- Ilan Pappé (1992) The Making of the Arab-Israeli Conflict 1947-1951, I B Tauris, ISBN 1-85043-819-6
- Ted Swedenburg (1988) The Role of the Palestinian Peasantry in the Great Revolt 1936 - 1939. in Islam, Politics, and Social Movements, edited by Edmund Burke III and Ira Lapidus. Berkeley: University of California Press. ISBN 0-520-06868-8 pp 189–194 & Marvin E. Gettleman, Stuart Schaar (2003) The Middle East and Islamic world reader, Grove Press, ISBN 0-8021-3936-1 pp 177–181
