= Tannous =

Tannous is a surname. Notable people with the surname include:

- Dominique Tannous, Lebanese fencer
- Ibrahim Tannous (1929–2012), Lebanese military officer.
- Izzat Tannous (1896–1993), Palestinian physician and politician
- Mohammad Tannous (born 1992), Jordanian football player
