= World Islamic Congress =

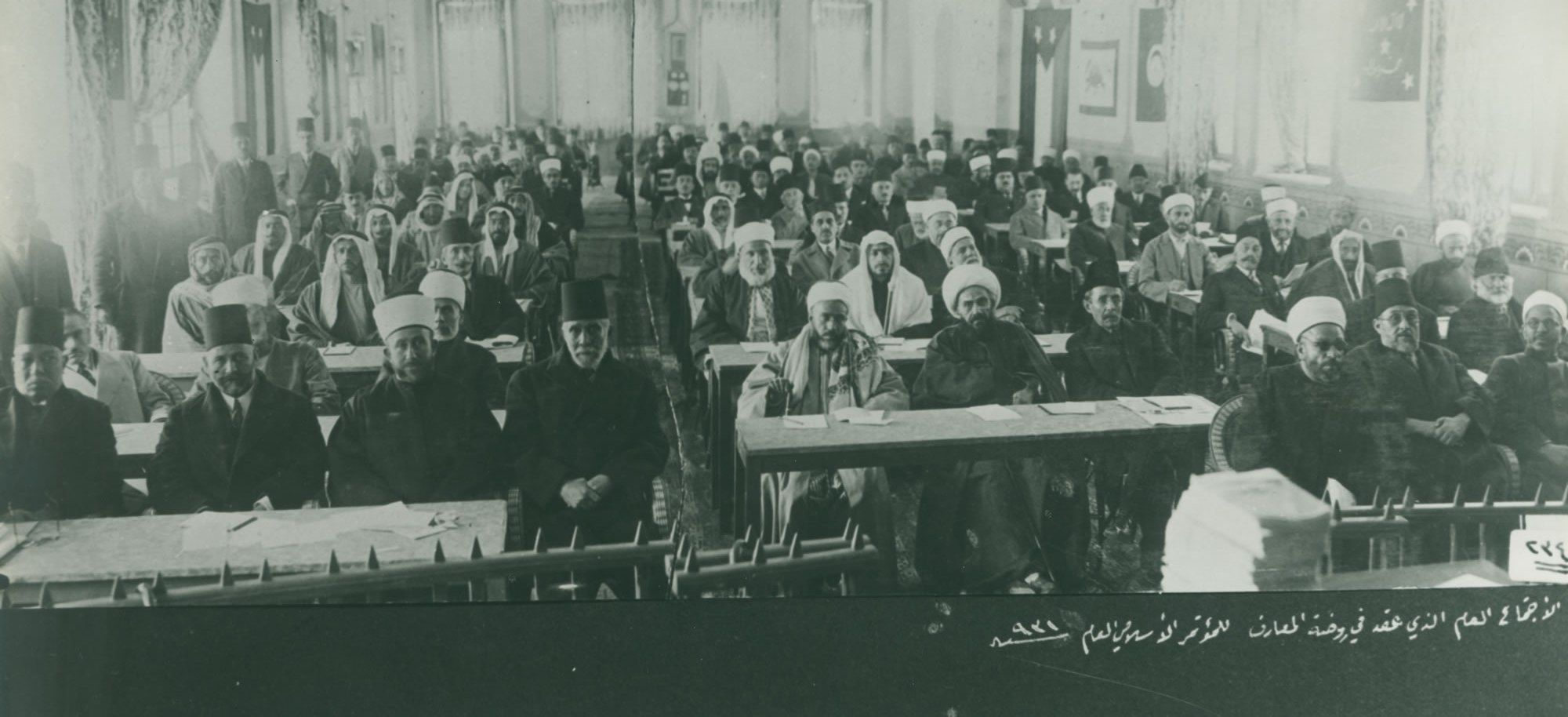
General Islamic Congress was held at Rawdat al-Ma’arif, Jerusalem, 1931

The World Islamic Congress was convened in Jerusalem in December 1931 at the behest of Mohammad Amin al-Husayni, the Grand Mufti of Jerusalem, and Maulana Shaukat Ali, leader of the Indian Caliphate Committee. Ostensibly the Congress was called to consider a proposal to establish a University at Al-Aqsa in Jerusalem as a center of Islamic scholarship, an idea which the leaders of the prestigious Al-Azhar University in Cairo opposed and which never came to fruition.

Attended by 130 delegates from 22 Muslim countries, the Congress called on Muslim states to avoid trade with the Zionist community in Palestine. The Husaynis, the Nashashibis, and the Khalidis reportedly argued for a conciliatory approach, but were ultimately unsuccessful. During the congress, the mufti accused his rivals of being "pro-Zionist" and having "Jewish Blood".

However, the Congress was widely viewed as an attempt by the mufti to enhance his prestige in advance of a bid for the office of caliph. This position had remained vacant since a Pan-Islamic Congress in Mecca in 1926 had failed to agree on a suitable candidate to replace King Hussein of Hejaz. A rival clan of the Husaynis, the Nashashibis, helped to ensure that the mufti was unsuccessful in his bid for the caliphate.

Following the election of Husayni as president of the Congress the agenda was arranged as follows:

1. Holy Places and the Buraq wall
2. the University of Al Masjid el Aksa
3. the Hejaz Railway
4. the furtherance of Muslim teaching and culture
5. Publications
6. Constitution of the Muslim Congress
7. Resolutions

The Congress resolved that "Zionism is ipso facto an aggression detrimental to Muslim well-being, and that it is directly or indirectly ousting Moslems from the control of Muslim land and Muslem Holy Places". It was also resolved that the Congress should meet at intervals of two or three years and that resolutions should be enacted by an Executive Committee chaired by Husayni.

== See also ==
- General Islamic Congress

== Sources ==
=== Secondary ===
- Kramer, Martin S. (1986). "In Defense of Jerusalem: The General Islamic Congress, 1931". Islam Assembled: The Advent of the Muslim Congresses. Columbia University Press. ISBN 9780231059947.
- Coury, Ralph M. (1992). "Egyptians in Jerusalem: Their Role in the General Islamic Conference of 1931". The Muslim World. 82 (1–2): 37–54. doi:10.1111/j.1478-1913.1992.tb03540.x.
- Kirillina, S. A.; Safronova, A. L.; Orlov, V. V. (2023). "High Hopes, Lost Illusions: General Islamic Congress in Jerusalem (1931)". RUDN Journal of World History. 15 (1): 7–21. doi:10.22363/2312-8127-2023-15-1-7-21.
- Matthews, Weldon C. (2003). "Pan-Islam or Arab Nationalism? The Meaning of the 1931 Jerusalem Islamic Congress Reconsidered". International Journal of Middle East Studies. 35 (1): 1–22. ISSN 0020-7438.
- Mayer, Thomas (1982). "Egypt and the general Islamic conference of Jerusalem in 1931". Middle Eastern Studies. 18 (3): 311–322. doi:10.1080/00263208208700514.
- Nielsen, Alfred (1932). "THE INTERNATIONAL ISLAMIC CONFERENCE AT JERUSALEM". The Muslim World. 22 (4): 340–354. doi:10.1111/j.1478-1913.1932.tb03758.x.
- Roberts, Nicholas E. (2019). "Making Jerusalem the centre of the Muslim World: Pan-Islam and the World Islamic congress of 1931". Contemporary Levant. 4 (1): 52–63. doi:10.1080/20581831.2019.1594609.
- Feiler, Gil (1998). From Boycott to Economic Cooperation: The Political Economy of the Arab Boycott of Israel. London: Routledge. ISBN 0-7146-4423-4

=== Primary ===
- 'Close Of Moslem Conference, Egyptian Delegate Deported', From Our Correspondent, The Times, Friday, 18 December 1931; pg. 11; Issue 46009; col B.
- 'Moslem Congress In Jerusalem, Mufti As President', From Our Correspondent, The Times, Wednesday, 9 December 1931; pg. 11; Issue 46001; col G.
- 'Moslem Congress Zionist "Peril To Islam"', From Our Correspondent, The Times, Monday, 14 December 1931; pg. 11; Issue 46005; col C.
