= Rafiq al-Tamimi =

Palestinian politician

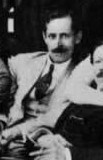

Member of Central Committee of al-Fatat
- In office 1918–1919

Chairman of al-Najjada
- In office 1945–1947

Personal details
- Born: 1889 Nablus, Ottoman Empire
- Died: 1957 (aged 67–68)
- Party: Palestine Arab Party
- Other political affiliations: al-Fatat
- Occupation: Arab nationalist political activist
- Profession: Administrative leader and educator
- Committees: Arab Higher Committee

Muhammad Rafiq al-Tamimi (Arabic: محمد رفيق التميمي, 1889–1957) was a Palestinian Arab educator and political figure in the 20th century. He was appointed to the Arab Higher Committee in 1945 and was the chairman of the Palestinian Arab paramilitary scout movement, al-Najjada (1945–47).

== Early life ==
Al-Tamimi was born in Nablus to a landowning family in 1889. He attended elementary and secondary school in the city and then at the Marjan Preparatory School in Istanbul, Turkey. Because of his well-rated performance at Marjan, he entered and won an academic contest. He enrolled at the Mulkiyya College in Istanbul as a result. He was consequently recognized by the Ottoman Education Ministry and given a grant to learn at the Sorbonne in Paris. There he received a degree in literature and education.

== Political career ==
Al-Tamimi served in the local administration of the Ottoman Empire as a principal of a government-run school in Beirut. Despite working for the Ottoman government, in 1911, while in Paris, he and his colleague Awni Abd al-Hadi founded the underground organization, al-Fatat, which called for Arab independence from the empire. In 1916, during World War I, Ottoman officials ordered al-Tamimi to gather information for a general "guide book" on the southern half of the Beirut Province, namely Jabal Nablus.

He was elected to the central committee of al-Fatat in December 1918. In July 1919, following the Arab Revolt (1916–18) which succeeded in gaining Arab independence, al-Tamimi along with Izzat Darwaza, Sa'id Haydar and other members of al-Fatat's inner circle formed a group in the Syrian National Congress that rejected the establishment of any foreign mandate (British or French) in the region of Syria, claiming it would only be a "disguised form of imperialist penetration."

In the early 1940s, he joined the Palestine Arab Party and represented the party on the Arab Higher Committee in 1945. He also became chairman of the Jaffa branch of the National Committee. Al-Tamimi was known to be a close associate of Amin al-Husayni, the chairman of the AHC. He led efforts to merge the al-Najjada and al-Futuwa youth movements in Palestine in 1946. In May 1946, the Arab League dissolved the AHC and al-Tamimi was not part of the replacement Arab Higher Executive, under Amin al-Husayni's chairmanship, which was based in Cairo. After the Bloudan Conference of 1947, he was reappointed to the reformed AHC by Jamal al-Husayni on January 5, 1947. He was part of the Palestinian delegation to the Arab League in February 1948 aimed at obtaining military, political, and moral support for the Palestinian cause from the Arab states.

== Bibliography ==
- Abu-Ghazaleh, Adnan (1973), Arab cultural nationalism in Palestine during the British Mandate, Volume 34, Institute of Palestine Studies
- Doumani, Beshara (1995), Rediscovering Palestine: Merchants and Peasants in Jabal Nablus, 1700-1900, University of California Press, ISBN 0-520-20370-4
- Khalaf, Issa (1991), Politics in Palestine: Arab factionalism and social disintegration, 1939-1948, SUNY Press, ISBN 0-7914-0708-X
- Levenberg, Haim (1993), Military Preparations of the Arab Community in Palestine, 1945-1948, Routledge, ISBN 978-0-7146-3439-5
- Muslih, Muhammad Y. (1989), The Origins of Palestinian Nationalism, Columbia University Press, ISBN 978-0-231-06509-2
