= Sami Taha =

Palestinian Arab labor leader (1916–1947)

Palestinian Arab labor leader
- In office ? – 12 September 1947

Personal details
- Born: 1916 Arraba, near Jenin, Palestine
- Died: 12 September 1947 (aged 31) Haifa, Palestine
- Party: Palestine Arab Workers Society

Sami Taha (Arabic: سامي طه; also known as Sami Taha Hamran; 1916 – September 12, 1947) was a leading Palestinian Arab labor leader during the period of British rule.

He has been remembered as "a young leader of trades unionists in Palestine, who was building one of the best working class movements in the Arab world, and [who] went into opposition to the Mufti" during the late British Mandate. He was assassinated in 1947.

== Early life ==
Taha was born in Arraba in 1916, a town near Jenin. He had completed primary school but, through independent study, he became fluent in English and acquired a good knowledge of labour law. His family later moved to Haifa, where he lived during his teenage years, in the early 1930s. There he came to the attention of a very influential man in the city named Rashid al-Haj Ibrahim, who employed Taha to work in the Arab Chamber of Commerce. In 1937, during the 1936–39 Arab revolt in Palestine, he was detained by British forces for six months without trial under the Defence (Emergency) Regulations.

== Labor leader ==
Taha became an important figure in Palestine and the leader of the Palestinian Arab labor movement after organizing an Arab labor movement similar to the Jewish Histadrut. Taha joined the Palestine Arab Workers Society (PAWS), which was established in 1925, where he was employed as a low-level clerk and later as secretary. He worked his way up the organization and in 1937, he was appointed its general secretary.

Some viewed Taha as conservative in policies, and he was rivaled by the left or communist-leaning factions of the PAWS. By his late twenties, Taha dominated PAWS by being its spokesman and worked to enlarge the organization in membership and stature. In 1944, Arab and Jewish workers went on strike in Haifa, led by PAWS and the Histadrut. The strike was favored by the leftist factions of PAWS, but Taha, not interested in a long, politically risky strike, vouched for Arab workers to end it.

In 1946, Jamal al-Husayni appointed Taha as the labour representative of the Arab Higher Committee (AHC). Tensions between Taha and the al-Husayni members and loyalists in the AHC who dominated that organization became increasingly high in 1947 as the Husaynis became angered at Taha's refusal to obey AHC demands. Some of these deviations included Taha's refusal to allow the PAWS to endorse a day-long strike called by the AHC to protest the anniversary of the 1917 Balfour Declaration, as well as the PAWS adoption of a socialist guiding principle going against the communist-led AHC. Taha was also accused of being willing to compromise with the Jews and was perceived as "not anti-Zionist and anti-British enough." By August 1947, newspapers politically aligned with the AHC began publishing these and other allegations against Taha.

== Assassination ==
Taha had voiced support for Jewish rights. His society supported a Palestinian state separate from an Arab state and had acknowledged that Jews also had rights. Due to extremists having suspicions of Taha’s lack of patriotism, he was assassinated. On September 12, 1947, Taha was assassinated outside his Haifa home. The assailant was not apprehended, but it is known that he was killed on the orders of Haj Amin al-Husseini, the Grand Mufti of Jerusalem and leader of the Palestine Arab Party. Taha was buried in Balad al-Sheikh. Thousands attended his funeral.
