= Fu'ad Nassar =

Communist leader in Palestine

- فؤاد نصار
- Poster of the Palestinian People's Party commemorating the 20th death anniversary of Fu'ad Nassar

General Secretary of the National Liberation League
- In office 1943–1951

General Secretary of the Jordanian Communist Party
- In office 1951–1956

Personal details
- Born: 1914 Nazareth, Ottoman Empire
- Died: September 30, 1976 (aged 61)
- Party: Palestine Communist Party, National Liberation League, Jordanian Communist Party

Military service
- Allegiance: Ansar Forces

Fu'ad Nassar (Arabic: فؤاد نصار; 28 November 1914 – 30 September 1976), was a Palestinian communist leader. Nassar became associated with the anti-colonial struggle in 1929. He joined the Palestinian Communist Party and was in charge of the military activities of the party during the 1936-1939 insurgency. He led the Nazareth branch of the Palestinian Arab Workers Society.

Nassar was imprisoned in Iraq. He returned to Palestine in 1943. With the Palestine Communist Party in crumbles, he and other younger Arab communist leaders took the initiative to form the National Liberation League. He and Emile Touma were the co-chair of the Communist Party based in Haifa. Nassar became the General Secretary of the League. In 1944 the Nazareth branch of the Palestinian Arab Workers Society broke away from the mother organization. In the same year, he helped establish the Arab language newspaper Al-Ittihad.

When remaining West Bank elements of the League merged into the Jordanian Communist Party in 1951, Nassar became general secretary in the Jordanian party. He was arrested on 29 December 1951 and sentenced to a ten year imprisonment. He was released by the Nabulsi government in 1956, but he had to leave Jordan soon thereafter as King Hussein stepped up repression against communists.

With Nassar in exile, a power struggle emerged within the party. The acting general secretary inside Jordan, Fatim as-Salifi, was more prone towards seeking reconciliation with the government. Whilst the sector loyal to as-Salfiti party promoted non-military struggles against Israel, Nassar argued that communists should actively take part in the liberation struggle. Moreover, he opposed United Nations Security Council Resolution 242. He formed the Ansar Forces, a Palestinian communist militia 1970, under joint command of the Jordanian, Syrian and Iraqi parties. The Ansar Forces lasted for three years, and in practice received little assistance from the Jordanian Communist Party.

In January 1973, Nassar was the first communist to be adopted into the Palestinian National Council. Nassar died in 1976.
