= Shaw Dallal =

Palestinian American writer

- شو دلال
- Born: Shawkat Jamil Dallal شوكت جميل دلال; 25 October 1931; Tulkarm, British Mandate of Palestine
- Died: 3 July 2016 (aged 84); New Hartford, New York, U.S.
- Education: Al-Fadiliya School
- Occupations: Writer; professor
- Relatives: Shakeeb Dallal (brother)

Shawkat Jamil Dallal (25 October 1931 – 3 July 2016) was a Palestinian-American author, professor, and human rights activist. He was the younger brother of Shakeeb Dallal and the son of Jamil H. Dallal, who was active in the 1936–1939 Arab Revolt in Palestine. His novels include "Scattered like Seeds" and "The Secret of Rose-Anne Riley".

== Early life and education ==
Dallal, the youngest of eight children, was born in Tulkarm city, British Mandatory Palestine, on October 25, 1931. He studied at Al Fadiliyeh High School in Tulkarm and at St. George High School in Jerusalem. His family farmed.

He completed his studies at Cornell in 1959 with a doctorate of jurisprudence.

== Career ==
From 1991 to 2004, he was an adjunct professor of political science at the Maxwell School at Syracuse University.
