= Shakeeb Dallal =

Palestinian political and leader military

- Born: 1920; Tulkarm, Palestine
- Died: 1992 (aged 71–72); Amman, Jordan
- Occupations: Politician, Commander

Shakeeb Dallal (1920–1992) was a Palestinian politician born in the city of Tulkarm, British Mandate Palestine. He was a Palestinian politician and Commander, and Of the members and leaders of the Palestine Liberation Organization. the son of Jamil H. Dallal, who was active in the 1936 Arab Uprising against the British Mandate.

== Political and military life ==
Shakeeb Dallal was one of the founders of Ba'ath party and was a member of the PLO and a member of its PNC, the Palestinian National Council. In his younger years, he was an important participant in the Palestine Arab Workers Society, led by Sami Taha, and played a significant role in expanding the Society, especially in the Nablus, Jenin and Tulkarm areas.

== Military battles ==
He led The Great Battle of Beit Shean in 1947, and was wounded in it.

== Death ==
He died in 1992 in Amman, Jordan.
