= Nashashibi family =

Palestinian political dynasty

Nashashibi (Arabic: النشاشيبي, transliteration: Al-Nashāshībī) is the name of a prominent Palestinian Arabic family based in Jerusalem.

After the First World War, during the British period, Raghib al-Nashashibi was Mayor of Jerusalem (1920–1934).

A branch of the family, Al Hassani, are reputed to have moved to Damascus in Syria; another minor branch, the Akattan, is presumed to have been established in Turkey of the offspring of a major Nashashibi Ottoman officer who withdrew to Turkey after the First World War and the fall of Palestine from Ottoman rule. Little is known about the whereabouts in Egypt of the presumed source of the family.

== History ==
=== Mamluk and Ottoman periods ===
The Nashashibis are thought to be of Kurdish-Circassian origin. first became notable and prominent in Jerusalem with the advent of Prince (of the army) Nasser al-Din al-Nashashibi who migrated (or led a military contingent?) to Jerusalem from Egypt in 1469 CE. He was chosen to guard and be the custodian of al-Haram ash-Sharif (the two Sacred Shrines): the al-Aqsa Mosque and the Cave of the Patriarchs (the Al-Ibrahimi Mosque) in Hebron. Nasser al-Din is also credited with being the first official to bring "piped" and channelled water to Jerusalem from the Bethlehem (Al Khader) area. A gate to the esplanade of the Jerusalem Haram is named after him.

The family became one of the prominent Muslim families of Jerusalem as landowners, merchants, public/government officials and later as professionals. As a family of "notables" in Jerusalem a prominent elder of the family, Rashid Nashashibi, was one of two people chosen to represent Jerusalem in the Ottoman Majlis in c. 1910.

Despite their relatively favoured position with the Ottomans, some members of the family took part in the struggle against the Ottoman regime. The outstanding member of the family who opposed Ottoman rule and was executed for his pan-Arab nationalist agitation and advocacy was Ali Omar Nashashibi (also referred in some history books as Bitar Ali, bitar meaning veterinarian), who had been a commissioned veterinary doctor and officer in the Ottoman army and a founder of one of the earliest pan-Arab nationalist movements, the Kahtani Society. Ali Omar was executed by Djemal Pasha in Beirut at the Sahet Al-Shuhada (Place des Martyres) in 1917 for conspiracy and political agitation within the Ottoman Army.

=== British Mandate period ===
Nashashibi family, 1929. Raghib al-Nashashibi standing above the bride

The Nashashibi family had a strong influence in Palestinian affairs during the British Mandate period, from 1920 until 1948. During this period, they competed with the al-Husayni clan, another prominent Arab Jerusalem family, for leadership of Palestinian Arab political affairs. The views of these two families largely shaped the divergent political stances of Palestinian Arabs at the time. Another influential family was the Khalidi.

Raghib Nashashibi, the head of the Nashashibi clan at the time, was an influential political figure throughout the British Mandate period, and beyond. He was appointed Mayor of Jerusalem in 1920 by the British, and helped form the Palestinian Arab National Party in 1928 and the National Defence Party in 1934. In 1936, he joined to the Arab Higher Committee, formed on the initiative of Amin al-Husayni, of the rival al-Husayni clan; however, Raghib and the clan-controlled National Defence Party soon withdrew from the Committee.

The 1936-39 Arab revolt was sparked by opposition to Jewish immigration, which had greatly increased due to anti-Semitism in Europe. Members of the Nashashibi family began to be targeted, as well as the Jewish community and British administrators. Raghib Nashashibi was forced to flee to Egypt after several assassination attempts on him, which were ordered by the mufti, Amin al-Husayni. Raghib’s nephew, Fakhri Nashashibi helped organize forces known as “peace bands” to fight insurgents and give information to the British. Following the assassination of the Acting British District Commissioner of Galilee, Lewis Yelland Andrews, on 26 September 1937, the British outlawed the Arab Higher Committee, arrested its members and ordered nationalist political parties to dissolve. Raghib al-Nashashibi and the National Defence Party was not subject to the ban. Many of the other political figures were either arrested, deported or went into exile.

==== Views ====
The Nashashibi family was considered to be politically moderate compared to the more militant views of the Husayni family. The Nashashibis favoured political, rather than violent, opposition to the British Mandate and Zionism. They were also willing to compromise in some areas that many Palestinians were not. For example, the Nashashibi family favoured the partition proposed by Britain in 1937 and reservedly accepted the 1939 White Paper, though they backtracked when attacked by political opponents. Similarly, the Nashashibi also favoured Arab participation in the Legislative Council proposed by the British Mandate, which would feature representatives of the various religious groups in Palestine at the time.

Generally, the Nashashibi family and their political followers advocated compromise with Zionists and the British authorities. This fell in stark contrast to the views of the Husaynis, who advocated a total rejection of the Balfour Declaration policy. The Palestine Arab Party, formed in 1935 by the Husayni’s in response to the formation of Nashashibi’s National Defense Party, believed in the maximalist programme of dissolution of the Jewish National Home and creation of a solely Arab government. The Nashashibis, however, felt that Arabs were most likely to achieve their political goals by working within the Mandate system, rather than fighting against it.

=== Husayni-Nashashibi rivalry ===
Throughout the British mandate period, the Husayni and Nashashibi clans were the two most powerful Arab families in Palestine and they constantly competed for power. While the two families did not differ on their long-term goals (stopping the influx of European Jews and supporting an Arab Palestinian state), they disagreed on the best way to achieve those goals. The Husayni family rejected the British mandate and Zionism as a whole, while the Nashashibis felt that the best approach was through political compromise.

Politics in Palestine as a whole largely diverged along the rift created by these two families. This produced a level of factionalism among Palestinian Arabs that often crippled them in fighting Zionism. Additionally, partisan bickering often resulted in one family blocking the policies of the other family that genuinely may have been in the national interest. Unfortunately for Palestinian Arabs, their ability to effectively negotiate was often hindered by their inability to present a united front on the issue of Zionism.

On the rivalry, an editorial in the Arabic-language Falastin newspaper in the 1920s commented:

The spirit of factionalism has penetrated most levels of society; one can see it among journalists, trainees, and the rank and file. If you ask anyone: who does he support? He will reply with pride, Husseini or Nashasibi, or. . . he will start to pour out his wrath against the opposing camp in a most repulsive manner.

== Family since 1948 ==
In 1947, the United Nations voted in favour of the partition of Palestine, which Arab leaders rejected.

Following Israeli statehood in May 1948, the Mufti attempted to form from Egypt the All Palestine Government in Gaza, but Abdullah of Jordan prevented this and annexed the larger remaining Arab area of Palestine (now called the West Bank) to Transjordan, forming the Kingdom of Jordan. After Jordan's takeover of the West Bank, Raghib al-Nashashibi served as a minister in the Jordanian government, governor of the West Bank, member of the Jordanian Senate, and the first military governor of the West Bank in Palestine. The appointment, with the backing by Arab states, other than Egypt, signaled the defeat of the mufti.

Currently, members of the clan hold prominent positions in the Palestine National Council and the Palestine Liberation Organization.

== Notable members ==
- Fakhri al-Nashashibi, nephew of Raghib.
- Mufid Nashashibi
- Raghib al-Nashashibi, member of the Ottoman Majlis for Jerusalem c. 1910 and mayor of Jerusalem, 1920–1934.
- Mohammad Zuhdi Nashashibi, the first Finance Minister of the Palestinian National Authority, 1994 to 2002.
- Rosalind Nashashibi
- Sharif Hikmat Nashashibi
- Rami al-Nashashibi
