= Zaki Alhadif =

Mayor of Tiberias in Mandatory Palestine (1890–1938)

- זאכי אלחדיף
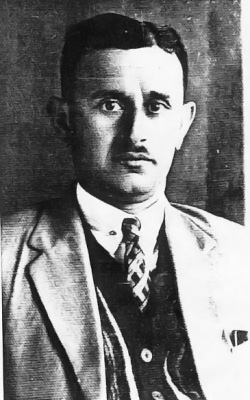
- Alhadif between 1928-38

Mayor of Tiberias
- In office October 1923 – October 27, 1938
- Preceded by: Qadri Hafez Effendi
- Succeeded by: Shimon Dahan

Personal details
- Born: 1890, Tiberias, Ottoman Empire
- Died: 27 October 1938 (aged 47–48) (assassinated) Tiberias, Mandatory Palestine
- Profession: Merchant, Politician

Zaki Alhadif (Hebrew: זאכי אלחדיף; 1890 – October 27, 1938) was a Sephardic Jewish politician in Mandatory Palestine who served as the mayor of Tiberias.

Alhadif was appointed as a temporary mayor in October 1923. He was elected to the post in the 1927 Municipal Councils elections in Mandatory Palestine, and reacted in 1934.

Alhdif was one of the signatories to an open letter calling for the 1929 Palestine riots to end.

Alhadif administrated Tiberias during the 1938 Tiberias massacre, and was assassinated on October 27 that year.

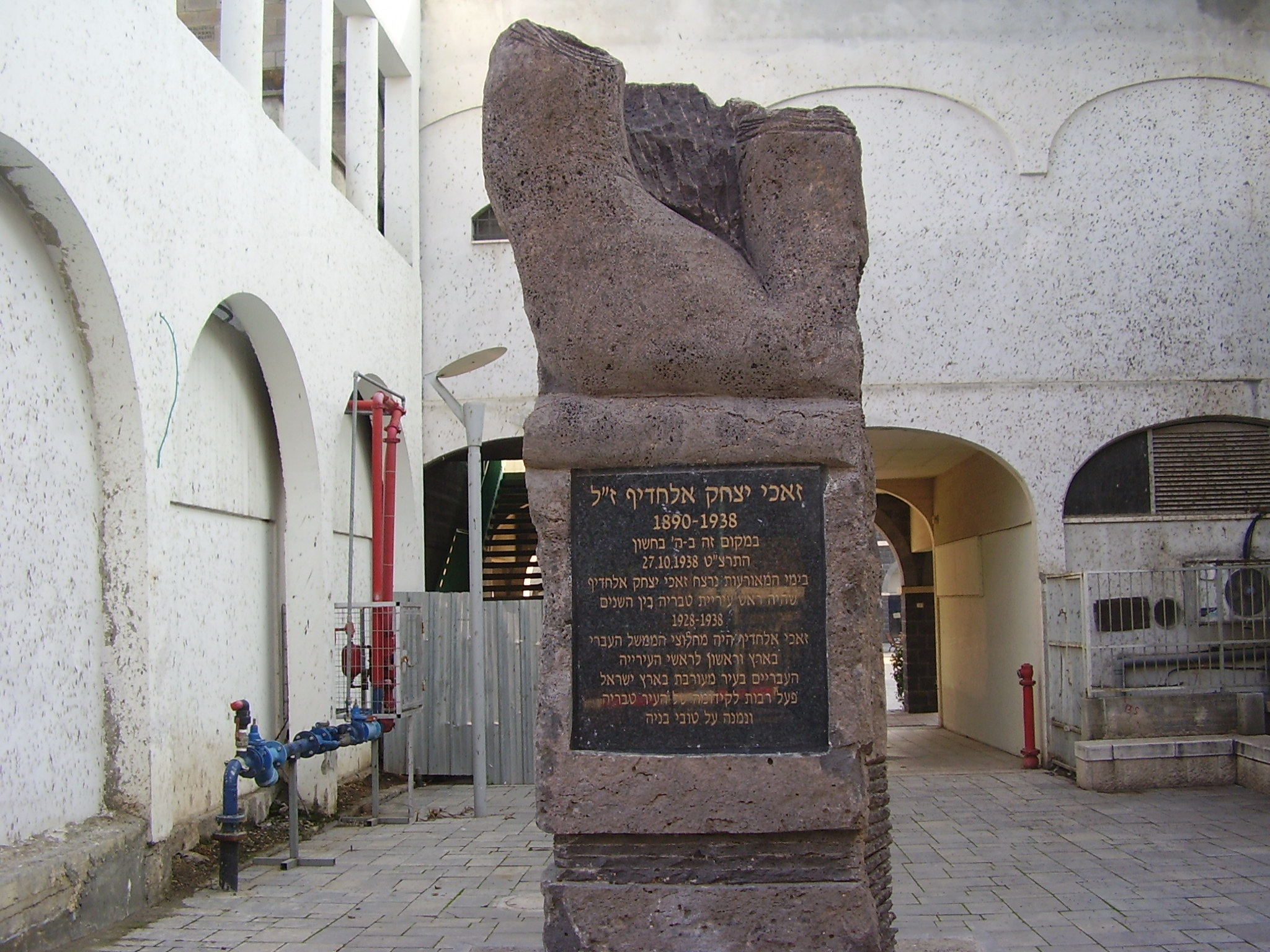
Memorial in honour of Alhadif

Alhadif was a supporter of Zionism.
