= Al-Jami'a Al-'Arabiya =

Arabic daily newspaper in Mandatory Palestine (1927–1935)

- Type: Weekly newspaper; Daily newspaper
- Founder: Munif Al Husseini
- Editor-in-chief: Munif Al Husseini; Taher Al Fitiani
- Founded: 20 January 1927
- Ceased publication: 27 December 1935
- Political alignment: Arab nationalism
- Language: Arabic
- Headquarters: Jerusalem
- Country: Mandatory Palestine

Al Jamia Al Arabiya (Arabic: الجامعة العربية, romanized: Al-Jami'a al-'Arabiyya, lit. 'The Arab League') was a nationalist newspaper which was in circulation from 1927 to 1935 in Jerusalem, Mandatory Palestine. It was the first official newspaper of the Palestine Arab Party.

== History and profile ==
Al Jamia Al Arabiya was started as a weekly by Munif Al Husseini in Jerusalem in 1927. Its first issue appeared on 20 January that year. Munif was a member of the Al Husseini family and was a nephew of Amin Al Husseini. The editor of the paper was Munif Al Husseini. Later Taher Al Fitiani joined the paper as its editor. It appeared five times per week from 1929 and became a daily publication in 1933.

Al Jamia Al Arabiya adopted a nationalist political stance. Because of this the paper was banned by the British many times. It also had a Pan-Arab and Pan-Islamic leaning. The paper began to support the Italian Fascists, and the British government in Palestine argued that it was a result of La Nation Arabe's influence. It frequently attacked the Falastin and Mirat Al Sharq newspapers due to their editorial policy. Al Jamia Al Arabiya published many articles criticizing the meeting of the International Missionary Council held in Jerusalem in March/April 1928. One of its contributors was a Zionist spy, Abdulkadir Rashid, who gave information about the Husseinis, their newspapers and the national institutions to the Jewish Agency for Israel.

Al Jamia Al Arabiya was an organ of the Supreme Moslem Council and then, of the Arab Executive Committee. The paper also became the official media outlet of the Palestine Arab Party in 1935 when it was established. Al Jamia Al Arabiya folded on 27 December 1935 after producing 1,711 issues.
