= Qudama ibn Ja'far =

10th-century scholar of Abbasid era

Qudama ibn Ja'far al-Katib al-Baghdadi
- Born: 873/874; Basra?
- Died: c. 932/948; Baghdad?

Academic work
- Era: Islamic Golden Age (Abbasid era)
- School or tradition: Islamic (Sunni)
- Main interests: Islamic geography, Land Tax, Philosophy, History, Administration
- Notable works: Book of Land Tax and Art of the Secretary

Qudāma ibn Jaʿfar al-Kātib al-Baghdādī (Arabic: قدامة بن جعفر الكاتب البغدادي; c. 873 – c. 932/948), was a Syriac scholar and administrator for the Abbasid Caliphate.

== Life ==
Little is known with certainty about Qudama's life and work. He was probably born ca. 873/874, possibly at Basra. His grandfather was a Syriac Christian. Whether it was his grandfather, or he himself, who converted to Islam under al-Muktafi bi-Allah in ca. 902–908 is unclear. Ibn al-Nadim described him as a master of literary style, a polished writer and distinguished philosopher of Logic despite having an uneducated father. He held various junior administrative positions in the caliphal secretariat in Baghdad, and eventually rose to a senior post the treasury department. Various dates for his death have been supplied, ranging from 932 to 939/940 and 948.

== Works ==
Of his several books on philosophy, history, philology, and administration, only three survive:

- the Kitab al-Kharaj (كتاب الخراج -the Book of the Land Tax, in full form Book of the Land Tax and the Art of the Secretary), for which Qudama is chiefly known. The last four sections of the original eight (Note: Al-Fihrist indicates that Qudama added a ninth section, however the Beatty MS contains a marginal note, perhaps a correction; "seven stages to which he added an eighth"), survives. It was written after 928 as a manual for administrators, and deals with the structure of the state and the army, as well with geographic details, including valuable accounts on the Caliphate's neighbours, especially the Byzantine Empire. It also included a now lost section on literary rhetoric.
- the Kitab al-Alfaz (Book of Words) or Jawahir al-Alfaz (Jewels of Words), a compilation of synonyms and phrases for the use of poets and orators, as well as containing an introduction on the figures of speech.
- the Kitab Naqd al-Shi'r (كتاب نقد الشعر -Book on Poetic Criticism), an essay and guide on composing good poetry.
- The Cleanser ("Sabun" or "soap")of Sorrow (كتاب صابون الغمّ)
- Dismissal of Anxiety (كتاب جلاء الحزن)
- Epistle about Abu 'Ali ibn Muqlah known as "The Brilliant Star" (كتاب الرسالة في أبي علي بن مقلة وتعرف بالنجم الثاقب)
- Withstanding Grief (كتاب صَرف الهمّ)
- Wines of Thought (كتاب درياق الفكر فيما عاب به أبا تمام) (Note: Beatty garbled but Flügel and Yaqut give "daryaq", i.e. theriac or theurgy)
- Book of Unconsciousness (كتاب جلاء الحزن)
- Book of Politics (كتاب السياسة)
- Refutation of Ibn al-Mu'tazz (كتاب الردّ على ابن المعتز)
- The Pleasure of Hearts and the Provision of the Traveller (كتاب صناعة الجدل وكتاب نزهة القلوب وزاد المسافر)

To Ibn Jaʿfar was once also attributed the Naqd al-nathr, now known to be the Kitāb al-Burhān fī wujūh al-bayān of Ibrāhīm ibn Wahb al-Kātib.

== Sources ==
- Bonebakker, S.E. (1986). "Kudāma". In Bosworth, C. E.; van Donzel, E.; Lewis, B. & Pellat, Ch. (eds.). The Encyclopaedia of Islam, Second Edition. Volume V: Khe–Mahi. Leiden: E. J. Brill. pp. 318–322. ISBN 978-90-04-07819-2.
- Kazhdan, Alexander, ed. (1991), Oxford Dictionary of Byzantium, Oxford University Press, ISBN 978-0-19-504652-6
- Masudi (al-), Abu al-Hasan Ali ibn al-Husayn (1871). Kitab Muruj al-Dhahab wa-Ma'adin al-Jawhar (Les Prairies d'or). Vol. 1. Translated by Bernard de Meynard & P de Courteille. Paris: Imprimerie nationale. p. 17.
- Nadim (al-), Ishaq ibn (1970). Dodge, Bayard (ed.). The Fihrist of al-Nadim A Tenth Century Survey of Muslim Culture. Vol. 1. New York & London: Columbia University Press.
- Taghri-Birdi, Abu al-Mahasin Yusuf. Popper, William (ed.). Al-Nujum al-Zahirah fi Muluk Misr wa-al-Qahirah. Vol. III. Cairo: Dar al-Kutub al-Misriyah. pp. 297–298.
- Yaqut, Shihab al-Din ibn 'Abd Allah al-Hamawi (1927) [1907]. Margoliouth, D.S. (ed.). Irshad al-Arib ala Ma'rifat al-Adib. Leiden: Brill.
