= Hind al-Husseini =

Palestinian activist (1916–1994)

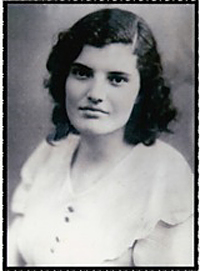
Hind al-Husseini c. 1940

Hind Taher al-Husseini (Arabic: هند طاهر الحسيني; 25 April 1916 – 13 September 1994) was a Palestinian woman notable for rescuing 55 orphaned survivors of the Deir Yassin massacre, after they were dropped off in Jerusalem and left to fend for themselves. She later converted her grandfather Salim al-Husayni's mansion into an orphanage, Dar al-Tifl al-Arabi, to house them, which became a school providing education to orphans and other children from Palestinian towns and villages.

Hind was also dedicated to women's issues, establishing a college for women, and serving in the Arab Women's Union.

== Early years ==
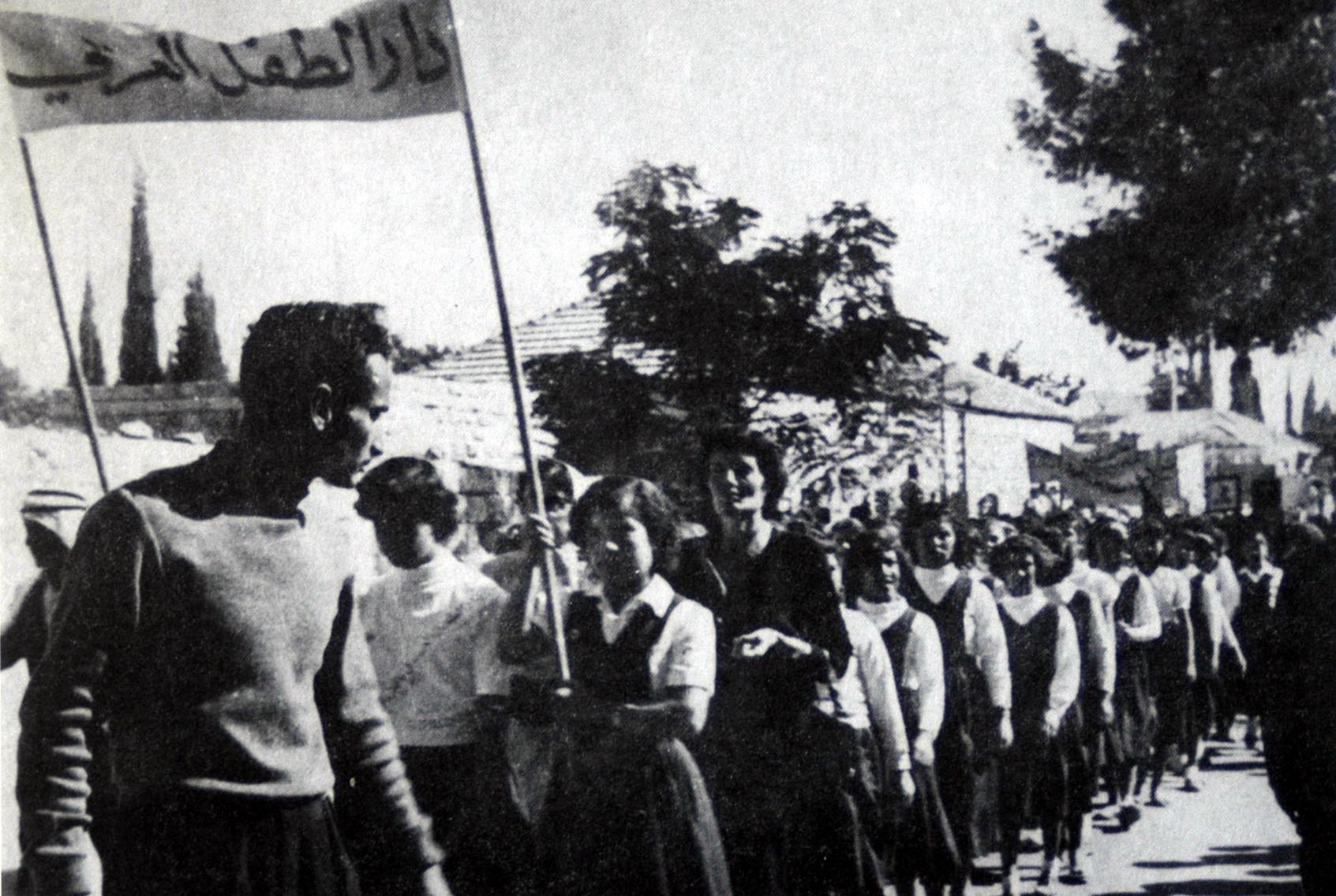
Hind al-Husseini demonstrating with schoolgirls, Jerusalem, (?). The banner reads: "Dar al-Tifl al-Arabi".

Hind was born to the prominent al-Husseini family in Jerusalem, and was a cousin of the Palestinian military leader Abd al-Qader al-Husseini. She was active in several social work organizations. In the 1930s, Hind joined student unions and was a member of the Women's Solidarity Society. She completed social work courses and she was an educator, becoming headmistress of a Jerusalem girls' school. Later on in the 1940s, she became coordinator of the Arab Women's Union.

== Orphanage ==
In April 1948, near the Holy Sepulcher Church, al-Husseini found a group of 55 children. Because of the dangers posed by the ongoing war, she told the children to go back to their homes. Shortly later, she returned to find the children had not left. One of the children explained that they have no home to return to and that they had survived the Deir Yassin Massacre where the Irgun paramilitary organization had killed their families and torn down their homes.

Al-Husseini provided the children shelter in two rooms rented by the Social Work Endeavour Society, a women's charity headed by Al-Husseini. She visited daily, accompanying and feeding the children. Fearful for al-Husseini putting herself at risk by making these trips in a warring area, the head of the Sahyoun convent convinced her to bring the children to the convent. Shortly after the children had moved, the rooms were hit.

Al-Husseini later relocated the children from the convent to her grandfather's mansion after the ceasefire. The mansion, which was built by her grandfather in 1891 and was her birthplace, was renamed Dar al-Tifl al-Arabi (دار الطفل العربي, 'Arab Children's House'). She transformed the mansion into an orphanage providing shelter to children survivors. Al-Husseini raised money, receiving funds from across the world. The orphanage grew and orphans from different villages and cities received their schooling at the orphanage including two Jewish girls who were not accepted at other schools.

Except for preschool level, kindergarten level, and boarding students under 6, the school became a girl-only school in 1967. The student body consisted of 300 orphans in 1995 but soon decreased by half after Gaza Strip was closed off to Jerusalem and Gazan orphans had to return. The number of orphan dropped by every passing year. As of mid-2008, of the 2,000 students, only 35 were orphans.

Committed to the education of women, al-Husseini created the Hind al-Husseini College for Women in 1982. Al-Husseini received awards for her work: the Jordan Globe Medallion for social work (1983), the Jordan Globe Medallion for education (1985), and the First Degree Medallion from Germany (1989).

=== Expansion and sections of the institution ===
The Board of Trustees of the Foundation and good friends of individuals and institutions inside and outside Palestine have expanded the institution to include the following sections:

- The internal section, which cares for orphans and needy Palestinians.
- Arab Child House School, consisting of kindergarten, primary school and high school.
- Department of secretarial and sewing.
- Department of Social Work Education (transferred to Al-Quds University)
- Dar Isaaf Nashashibi for Culture, Arts and Literature, which included the Department of Higher Diploma of Islamic Archeology (transferred to Al-Quds University)
- Hind Al Husseini College of Arts (transferred to Al Quds University)
- The Palestinian Folklore Museum, to include thousands of traditional Palestinian items of tools and clothing.

=== Administrative organization ===
The first administrative body of the Foundation was formed in 1949, which consisted of members:

- Hind Al Husseini, Owner and President.
- Anwar Al-Khatib, former mayor of Jerusalem.
- Basima Faris, former director of the Mamounieh School.

There have been many changes to this body, with the withdrawal of members and the accession of other members until Ms. Hind Al-Husseini died in 1994 and a new board of trustees was formed in 1995 to manage the foundation.

== Film biopic ==
Actress Hiam Abbass portrayed Husseini in the 2010 film Miral which was directed by Julian Schnabel. The life and work of Husseini is the subject of the film, largely through the perspective of the titular orphan, Miral (Freida Pinto), who is based on Rula Jebreal.
