= Al Liwaa (Mandatory Palestine newspaper) =

Arabic daily newspaper in Mandatory Palestine (1935–1937)

Al Liwaa اللواء
- Type: Daily newspaper
- Publisher: Jamal al-Husayni
- Founded: 2 December 1935
- Ceased publication: 1939
- Political alignment: Arab nationalism
- Language: Arabic
- Headquarters: Jerusalem
- Country: Mandatory Palestine

Al Liwaa (Arabic: اللواء, romanized: Al-Liwaa, lit. 'The Banner') was a daily newspaper which was published in Jerusalem, Mandatory Palestine, from 1935 to 1939. It supported the Al Husayni family of Palestine. It was one of the six leading newspapers in the Mandatory Palestine during the 1930s.

== History and profile ==
Al Liwaa was founded in Jerusalem in 1935, and its first issue appeared on 2 December 1935. Jamal al-Husayni was its publisher who was the leader of the Palestine Arab Party. Khalid al-Farakh managed the paper. It was edited by Emil Ghuri and George Salah al-Khoury. Othman Qassim, and Mahmud Chirqas also served as editors of the paper which featured both local and international news.

Al Liwaa was mostly read in cities and was not popular among rural Palestinians. It was financed by the Supreme Muslim Council. The paper adopted a nationalistic political stance and was close to the Palestine Arab Party. Therefore, it was among the supporters of the Al Husayni family and was a fierce critic of the British rulers whom it blamed for the sale of lands to the Jewish migrants.

Al Liwaa sold nearly 3,000–4,000 copies in 1936. It was banned by the British authorities in 1937 for a long period due to the "publication of matter likely to endanger public peace." The paper folded in 1939.

Some issues of Al Liwaa are archived by the National Library of Israel.
