= Arab Higher Committee =

Political organ of Palestinian Arabs in Mandatory Palestine

Arab Higher Committee اللجنة العربية العليا (Arabic)
- Leader: Mohammed Amin al-Husseini
- Founded: 25 April 1936; 89 years ago
- Dissolved: September 1948; 77 years ago (Note: (de facto; Oct. 1937 de jure))
- Ideology: Palestinian nationalism (Note: Arab-Islamic nationalism); Anti-Zionism

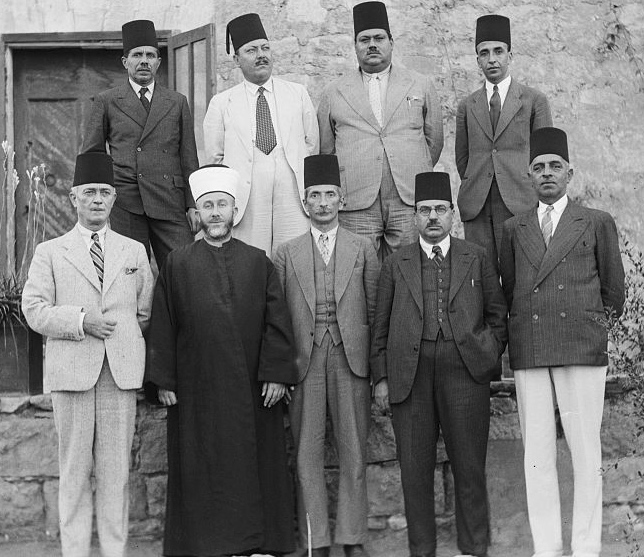
Members of the Arab Higher Committee, 1936. Front row from left to right: Raghib al-Nashashibi, Amin al-Husayni, Ahmed Hilmi Pasha (Gen. Manager of the Jerusalem Arab Bank), Abdul Latif Bey Es-Salah (chairman of the Arab National Party), Alfred Roke

A flag popular during the Arab Revolt in Palestine features similarities with the 1917 Arab Revolt flag.

A variant flag adopted by supporters of the Arab Higher Committee and affiliated paramilitary groups in 1938.

The Arab Higher Committee (Arabic: اللجنة العربية العليا, romanized: al-Lajnah al-ʻArabīyah al-ʻUlyā) or the Higher National Committee was the central political organ of Palestinians in Mandatory Palestine. It was established on 25 April 1936, on the initiative of Haj Amin al-Husayni, the Grand Mufti of Jerusalem, and comprised the leaders of Palestinian Arab clans and political parties under the mufti's chairmanship. The committee was outlawed by the British Mandatory administration in September 1937 after the assassination of a British official.

A committee of the same name was reconstituted by the Arab League in 1945, but went to abeyance after it proved ineffective during the 1948 Arab–Israeli War. It was sidestepped by Egypt and the Arab League with the formation of the All-Palestine Government in 1948 and both were banned by Jordan.

== Formation, 1936–1937 ==
The first Arab Higher Committee was formed on 25 April 1936, following the outbreak of the Great Arab revolt, and national committees were formed in all of the towns and some of the larger villages, during that month. The members of the committee were:

- Amin al-Husayni, president – member of the al-Husayni clan, the Grand Mufti of Jerusalem, and president of the Supreme Muslim Council until his dismissal from that position
- Raghib al-Nashashibi – member of the Nashashibi clan, which was considered to be political rivals of the al-Husayni clan, and to hold moderate views when compared to the more militant views of the al-Husayni, member of the National Defence Party
- Jamal al-Husayni – related to Amin al-Husayni and chairman of the Palestine Arab Party, member of the Supreme Muslim Council
- Yaqub al-Ghusayn – member and representative of the Youth Congress Party, member of the Supreme Muslim Council, deported
- Abd al-Latif Salah – founder of the National Bloc
- Husayin al-Khalidi – founder and representative of the Reform Party, deported
- Awni Abd al-Hadi – leader of the Istiqlal (Independence) Party, who was appointed General Secretary
- Ahmed Hilmi Pasha – treasurer, deported.

Initially, the committee included representatives of the rival Nashashibi and al-Husayni clans. The committee was formed after the 19 April call for a general strike of Arab workers and businesses, which marked the start of the 1936–39 Arab revolt. On 15 May 1936, the committee endorsed the general strike, calling for an end to Jewish immigration; the prohibition of the transfer of Arab land to Jews; and the establishment of a National Government responsible to a representative council. Later it called for the nonpayment of taxes. Raghib al-Nashashibi, of the Nashashibi clan and member of the National Defence Party soon withdrew from the committee.

In November 1936, and with the prospects of war in Europe increasing, the British government set up the Peel Royal Commission to investigate the causes of the disturbances. The strike had been called off in October 1936 and the violence abated for about a year while the Peel Commission deliberated. The commission was impressed by the fact that the Arab national movement, sustained by the committee, was a far more efficient and comprehensive political machine than had existed in earlier years. All the political parties presented a 'common front' and their leaders sit together on the Arab Higher Committee. Christian as well as Muslim Arabs were represented on it, with no opposition parties. The commission reported in July 1937 and recommended the partition of Palestine into Jewish and Arab states.

Arab leaders, both in the Husseini-controlled Arab Higher Committee and in the Nashashibi National Defense Party denounced partition and reiterated their demands for independence, arguing that the Arabs had been promised independence and granting rights to the Jews was a betrayal. The Arabs emphatically rejected the principle of awarding any territory to the Jews. After British rejection of an Arab Higher Committee petition to hold an Arab conference in Jerusalem, hundreds of delegates from across the Arab world convened at the Bloudan Conference in Syria on 8 September 1937, including 97 Palestinian delegates. The conference rejected both the partition and establishment of a Jewish state in Palestine. After the rejection of the Peel proposals, the revolt resumed. Members of the Nashashibi family began to be targeted, as well as the Jewish community and British administrators. Raghib Nashashibi was forced to flee to Egypt after several assassination attempts on him, which were ordered by Amin al-Husayni.

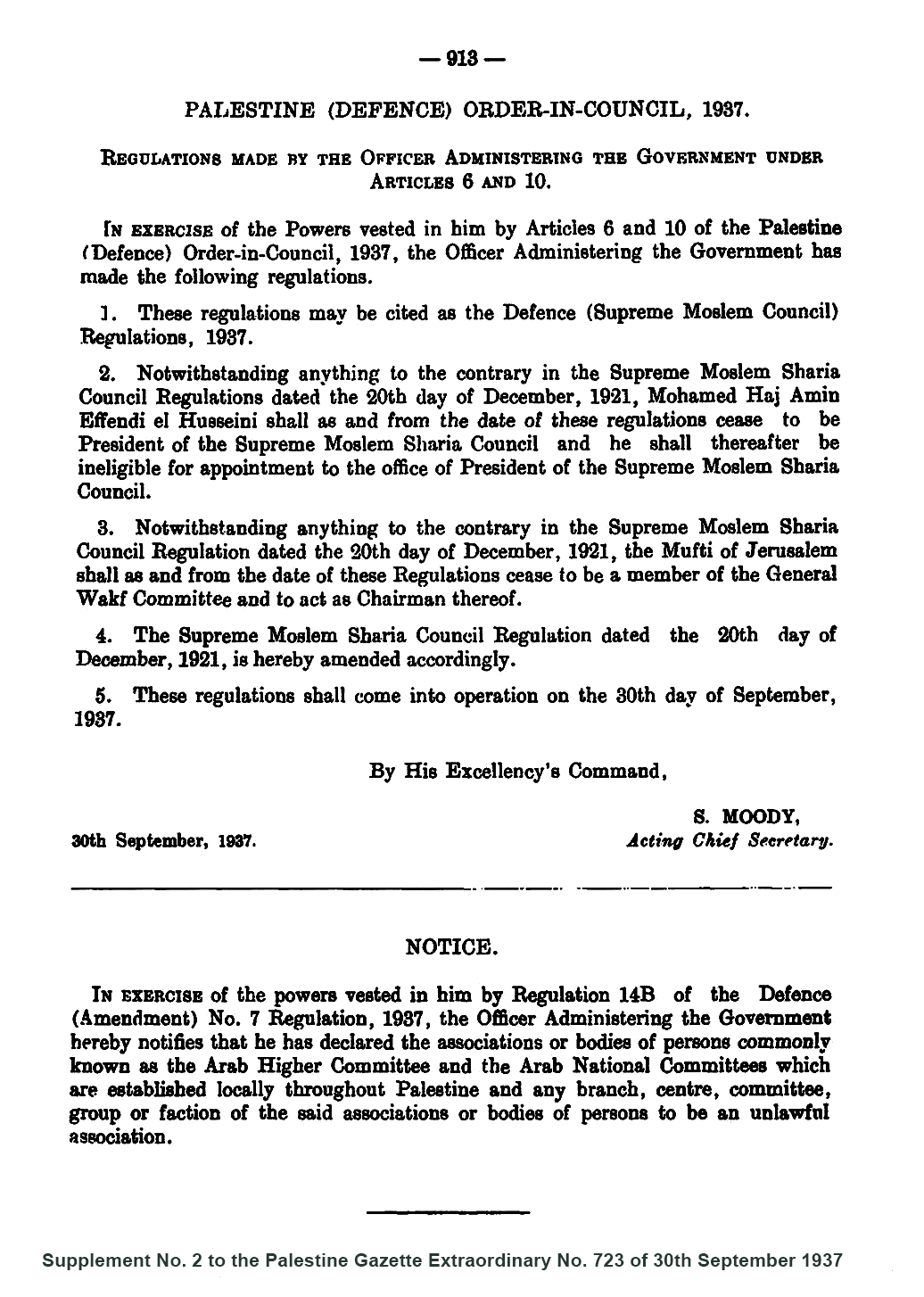
Dismissal of Amin al-Husseini from the Supreme Muslim Council and outlawing of the Arab Higher Committee

On 26 September 1937, the acting British district commissioner of Galilee, Lewis Yelland Andrews, was assassinated in Nazareth. Four days later Britain outlawed the Arab Higher Committee, and began to arrest its members. On 1 October 1937, the National Bloc, the Reform Party and the Istiqlal Party were dissolved. Yaqub al-Ghusayn, Al-Khalidi and Ahmed Hilmi Pasha were arrested and then deported. Jamal al-Husayni escaped to Syria, as did Abd al-Qadir al-Husayni. Amin al-Husayni managed to escape arrest, but was removed from the presidency of the Supreme Muslim Council. The committee was banned by the Mandate administration and three members (and two other Palestinian leaders) were deported to the Seychelles and the others moved into voluntary exile in neighbouring countries. Awni Abd al-Hadi, who was out of the country at the time, was not allowed to return. The National Defence Party, which had withdrawn from the AHC soon after its formation, was not outlawed, and Raghib al-Nashashibi was not pursued by the British.

== War period, 1938–1945 ==
When the committee was outlawed in September 1937, six of its members were deported, its president Amin al-Husayni managed to escape arrest and went into exile in Beirut. Jamal al-Husayni escaped to Syria. Three other members were deported to the Seychelles, and other members moved into voluntary exile in neighbouring countries. Al-Hadi, who was out of the country at the time, was not allowed to return. Membership of the outlawed committee had dwindled to Jamal al-Husayni (acting chairperson), Husayn al-Khalidi (secretary), Ahmed Hilmi Pasha and Emil Ghuri. For all practical purposes, the committee ceased to exist, however, this brought little change in the structure of Arab political life and the Palestinian revolt continued.

With the indications of a new European war on the horizon, and in an endeavor to resolve the inter-communal issues in Palestine, the British government proposed in late 1938 a conference in London of the two Palestinian communities. Some Arab leaders welcomed the proposed London Conference but indicated that the British would need to deal with the disbanded Arab Higher Committee and with Amin al-Husayni. On 23 November 1938, the Colonial Secretary, Malcolm MacDonald, repeated his refusal to allow Amin al-Husayni to be a delegate, but was willing to allow the five Palestinian leaders held in the Seychelles to take part in the conference. The deportees were released on 19 December and allowed to travel to Cairo and then, with Jamal Husseini, to Beirut where a new Arab Higher Committee (or Higher National Committee) was established. Amin al-Husayni was not a member of the Arab delegation but the delegation was clearly acting under his direction. The London Conference commenced on 7 February 1939, but the Arab delegation refused to sit in the same room with the Jewish delegation present, and the conference broke up in March with no success. In May 1939, the British government presented its 1939 White Paper which was rejected by both sides. The White Paper had, in effect, repudiated the Balfour Declaration. According to Benny Morris, Amin al-Husayni "astonished" the other members of the Arab Higher Committee by turning down the White Paper. Al-Husayni turned the advantageous proposal down because "it did not place him at the helm of the future Palestinian state."

The deportees were not allowed to return to Palestine until 1941. Amin Al-Husayni spent the war years in occupied Europe, actively collaborating with the Nazi leadership. Amin and Jamal al-Husayni were involved in the 1941 pro-Nazi Rashidi revolt in Iraq. Amin again evaded capture by Britain but Jamal was captured in 1941 and interned in Southern Rhodesia, where he was held until November 1945 when he was allowed to move to Cairo. Husayn al-Khalidi returned to Palestine in 1943. Jamal al-Husayni returned to British Palestine in February 1946 as an official of the new Arab Higher Committee, by then recognised by the Mandate administration. Amin Al-Husayni never returned to British Palestine.

== Reconstituted committee, 1945–1948 ==
=== 1945–1946 ===
After the end of the war, Amin al-Husayni managed to find his way to Egypt and stayed there until 1959, when he moved to Lebanon. On 22 March 1945, the Arab League was formed.

In November 1945, on the urging of Egypt, its leading member, the then seven members of the Arab League (Lebanon, Syria, Iraq, Jordan, Saudi Arabia, Egypt, and Yemen) reconstituted the Arab Higher Committee comprising twelve members as the supreme executive body of Palestinian Arabs in the territory of the British Mandate of Palestine. The committee was dominated by the Palestine Arab Party, controlled by the Husayni family, and was immediately recognised by Arab League countries. The Mandate government recognised the new committee two months later. In February 1946, Jamal al-Husayni returned from exile to Palestine and immediately set about reorganising and enlarging the committee, becoming its acting president. The members of the reconstituted committee as at April 1946 were:

- Jamal al-Husayni
- Tewfiq al-Husayni
- Yusif Sahyun
- Kamil al-Dajani
- Emile al-Ghury
- Rafiq al-Tamimi and
- Anwar al-Khatib (all members of or affiliated with the Palestine Arab Party)
- Izzat Tannous (an independent Christian medical doctor)
- Antone Attallah (a member of the Greek Orthodox community)
- Ahmad al-Shukayri (a lawyer from Acre and an Arab nationalist)
- Sami Taha – head of Palestine Arab Workers Society
- Yousef Haikal (the mayor of Jaffa, who was politically independent)

The Istiqlal Party and other nationalist groups objected to these moves, and formed a rival Arab Higher Front.

In May 1946, the Arab League ordered the dissolution of the AHC and Arab Higher Front and formed a five-member Arab Higher Executive, under Amin al-Husayni's chairmanship, and based in Cairo. The new AHE consisted of:

- Amin al-Husayni, as chairman
- Jamal al-Husayni, as vice-chairman
- Husayin al-Khalidi
- Emile al-Ghury
- Ahmed Hilmi Abd al-Baqi

The United Kingdom government called the 1946–47 London Conference on Palestine in an attempt to bring peace to its Mandate territory, which began on 9 September 1946. The conference was boycotted by the AHE as well as the Jewish Agency, but was attending by Arab League states, which argued against any partition.

=== 1947–1948 ===
In January 1947, the AHE was renamed the "Arab Higher Committee", with Amin al-Husayni as its chairman and Jamal al-Husayni as vice-chairman, and expanded to include the four remaining core members plus Hasan Abu Sa'ud, Izhak Darwish al-Husayni, Izzat Darwaza, Rafiq al-Tamimi and Mu'in al-Madi. This restructuring of the AHC to include additional supporters of Amin al-Husayni was seen as a bid to increase his political power.

Following the failure of the London Conference, the British referred the question to the UN on 14 February 1947.

In April 1947, the Arab Higher Committee repeated Arab and Palestinian demands in the solution for the Question of Palestine:

1. A complete cessation of the Jewish migration to Palestine.
2. A total halt to the sale of land to Jews.
3. Cancelation of the British Mandate in Palestine and the Balfour Declaration.
4. Recognition of the right of Arabs to their land and recognition of the independence of Palestine as a sovereign state, like all other Arab states, with a promise to provide minority rights to the Jews according to the rules of democracy.

The Arab states and the Arab Higher Committee officially boycotted the United Nations Special Committee on Palestine (UNSCOP) formed in May 1947 to investigate the cause of the conflict in Palestine, and, if possible, devise a solution. Despite the official Arab boycott, several Arab officials and intellectuals privately met UNSCOP members to argue for a unitary Arab-majority state, among them AHC member and former Jerusalem mayor Husayn al-Khalidi. UNSCOP also received written arguments from Arab advocates. The Arab Higher Committee rejected both the majority and minority recommendations within the UNSCOP report. They "concluded from a survey of Palestine history that Zionist claims to that country had no legal or moral basis". The Arab Higher Committee argued that only an Arab State in the whole of Palestine would be consistent with the UN Charter.

The Arab Higher Committee as well as the Arab states were actively involved in the deliberations of the Ad Hoc Committee on the Palestinian Question, formed in October 1947, again repeating its previous demands. Despite Arab objections, the ad hoc committee reported on 19 November 1947 in favour of a partition of Palestine.

The United Nations General Assembly voted on 29 November 1947 in favour of the Partition Plan for Palestine, all the Arab League states voting against the Plan. The Arab Higher Committee rejected the vote, declaring it invalid because it was opposed by Palestine's Arab majority. The AHC also declared a three-day strike and public protest to begin on 2 December 1947, in protest at the vote. The call led to the 1947 Jerusalem riots between 2–5 December 1947, resulting in many deaths and much property damage.

On 12 April 1948, with the end of the mandate looming, the Arab League announced its intention to take over the whole of the British Mandate territory, with the objective being:

The Arab armies shall enter Palestine to rescue it. His Majesty (King Farouk, representing the League) would like to make it clearly understood that such measures should be looked upon as temporary and devoid of any character of the occupation or partition of Palestine, and that after completion of its liberation, that country would be handed over to its owners to rule in the way they like.

The British Mandate of Palestine came to an end on 15 May 1948, on which day six of the then-seven Arab League states (Yemen being not active) invaded the now-former Mandate territory, marking the start of the 1948 Arab–Israeli War. The Arab Higher Committee claimed that the British withdrawal led to an absence of legal authority, making it necessary for the Arab states to protect Arab lives and property. The Arab states' proclaimed their aim of a "United State of Palestine" in place of Israel and an Arab state. The Arab Higher Committee said that in the future Palestine, the Jews will be no more than 1/7 of the population—i.e., only Jews that lived in Palestine before the British mandate would be permitted to stay. They did not specify what would happen to the other Jews.

== Criticism ==
The Arab Higher Committee has been criticised for not preparing the Palestinian population for the war, accepting the general expectation that Palestinian Arabs alone would not prevail over the Yishuv, and accepting the joint Arab strategy of outside Arab armies securing a prompt takeover of the country.

Anwar Nusseibeh, a Palestinian nationalist who believed that the best way to advance Palestinian interest was to operate within whichever regime was in power, criticized the Arab Higher Committee's performance during the 1948 Arab–Israeli War as being unaware and ineffective at best and ambivalent at worst to the needs of the Palestinian Arab population. In a personal note, Nusseibeh wrote, "Obviously they thought of the Palestine adventure in terms of an easy walkover for the Arabs, and the only point that seemed to worry them was credit for the expected victory. ... [They] were determined that the Palestine Arabs should at all costs be excluded."

The Arab community, being essentially agrarian, is loosely knit and mainly concerned with local interests. In the absence of an elective body to represent divergences of interest, it therefore shows a high degree of centralization in its political life. The Arab Higher Committee presented a 'common front' for all political parties. There was no opposition party. Decisions taken at the center. Differences of approach and interest, can be discerned, the more so from the strong pressure that is brought against them. In times of crisis, as in 1936–1938, such pressure has taken the form of intimidation and assassination. At present time, nonconformity regarding any important question on which the Arab Higher Committee has pronounced a policy is represented as disloyalty to the Arab nation.

== Demise ==
The Arab League – led by Egypt – set up the All-Palestine Government (an Egyptian protectorate) in Gaza on 8 September 1948, while the 1948 Arab–Israeli War was in progress, under the nominal leadership of Amin al-Husayni, which was soon recognized by six of the seven Arab League members, the exception being Transjordan. King Abdullah of Transjordan regarded the attempt to revive al-Husayni's Holy War Army as a challenge to his authority and all armed bodies operating in the areas controlled by the Arab Legion were ordered to disband. Glubb Pasha carried out the order ruthlessly and efficiently.

After the war, the Arab Higher Committee was politically irrelevant, and banned from the Jordanian West Bank, as was the All-Palestine Government.

== See also ==
- Society for the Defense of Palestine
- High Follow-Up Committee for Arab Citizens of Israel
- Bloudan Conference (1937)
- London Conference (1939)

== Bibliography ==
- Khalaf, Issa (1991). Politics in Palestine: Arab Factionalism and Social Disintegration, 1939–1948. SUNY Press. ISBN 978-0-7914-0707-3
- Levenberg, Haim (1993). Military Preparations of the Arab Community in Palestine: 1945–1948. London: Routledge. ISBN 978-0-7146-3439-5
- Milton-Edwards, Beverly (1999). Islamic Politics in Palestine. I. B. Tauris. p. 25. ISBN 978-0-8223-2814-8 – via Internet Archive.
- David Tal (2004) "Israel-Arab War, 1948 -1949/ Armistices" Routledge ISBN 978-0-7146-5275-7
- Sayigh, Yezid (2000). Armed Struggle and the Search for State: The Palestinian National Movement, 1949–1993. Oxford: Oxford University Press. ISBN 978-0-19-829643-0
- Segev, Tom. One Palestine, Complete: Jews and Arabs Under the British Mandate. Trans. Haim Watzman. New York: Henry Holt and Company, 2001. ISBN 978-0-316-64859-2
