= 1927 Palestinian local elections =

Elections were held to the municipal councils in Mandatory Palestine between March and May 1927.

During the late Ottoman period in Palestine the Ottoman Government recognised 22 municipalities, which the British kept in place following the Sinai and Palestine campaign. In two cities there was a Jewish majority, Jerusalem and Tiberias. Other cities had a Muslim or Christian majority.

== Results ==
District	Sub-District	Municipality	Election day	Elected mayor
Southern	Gaza	Gaza	8–9 April	
Southern	Gaza	Khan Yunis	6 April	Haj Salim Effendi Hussain
Southern	Gaza	Majdal	7 April	Taj-Addin Sha't
Southern	Beersheba	Beersheba	12 April	Taju effendi Sha’t
Southern	Jaffa	Jaffa	27–29 May	Assem Bey al-Said
Southern	Ramla	Ramla	2 May	Sheikh Mustafa al-Khairi
Southern	Ramla	Lydda	26 April	Ahmed Effendi Husseini
Jerusalem	Jerusalem	Jerusalem	5–7 April	Raghib al-Nashashibi
Jerusalem	Hebron	Hebron	13–14 April	Sheikh Mukhlis Hammuri
Jerusalem	Ramallah	Ramallah	24 March	Musa Effendi Khalil Musa
Jerusalem	Bethlehem	Bethlehem	27 March	Nicolas Attalah Effendi Shahin
Jerusalem	Bethlehem	Beit Jala	27 March	Jiries Effendi Juma Abu Awad
Northern	Nablus	Nablus	7 April	Suleiman Bey Abdel Razak Tukan
Northern	Jenin	Jenin	31 March	Aref Effendi Abdulrahman
Northern	Tulkarm	Tulkarm	13 April	Abdulrahman Effendi al-Haj Ibrahim
Northern	Bisan	Bisan	30 March	Haj Mahmud Effendi Abdullah el-Safadi
Northern	Haifa	Haifa	16–18 April	Hassan Bey Shukri
Northern	Haifa	Shafa Amr	?	Da'ud Sulaiman Talhami
Northern	Acre	Acre	11 April	Abdul Fatah el-Sa'adi
Northern	Nazareth	Nazareth	9 April	Selim Effendi Bishara
Northern	Tiberias	Tiberias	26 April	Zaki Alhadif
Northern	Safad	Safad	12 April	Mohamed Effendi Hasan Abd al-Rahman
