= Raghib al-Nashashibi =

Mayor of Jerusalem (1920–1934)

- راغب النشاشيبي
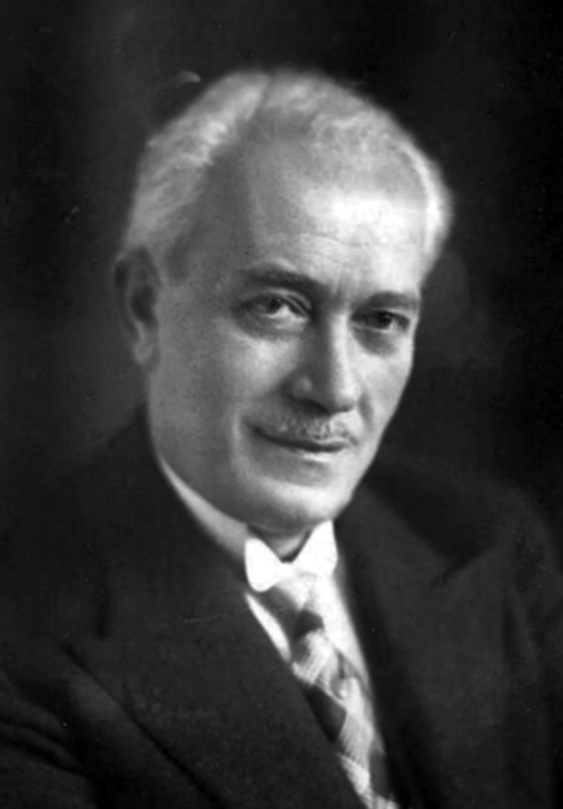

Mayor of Jerusalem
- In office 1920 – January 1935
- Preceded by: Musa al-Husayni
- Succeeded by: Hussein Khalidi

Minister of State and Custodian of the Holy Places of Jerusalem
- In office 1 January 1951 – 25 July 1951

Minister of Transport
- In office 4 December 1950 – 1 January 1951

Minister of Agriculture
- In office 12 April 1950 – 11 October 1950

Minister of State
- In office 12 January 1950 – 12 April 1950

Minister of Refugees
- In office 1 September 1949 – 12 January 1950

Personal details
- Born: 1881 Jerusalem
- Died: April 1951 (aged 69–70) East Jerusalem
- Party: National Defence Party

Raghib al-Nashashibi (Arabic: راغب النشاشيبي, Ragheb al-Nashashibī) (1881–1951), CBE (hon), was a Palestinian public figure and wealthy landowner during the Ottoman Empire, the British Mandate and the Jordanian administration. A member of the Nashashibi clan, he was one of the most influential families in Palestine and served as mayor of Jerusalem from 1920 to 1935.

== Background ==
Nashashibi graduated from Istanbul University and became Jerusalem's District Engineer. The Nashashibis were one of the oldest and most influential Jerusalem families, and historical rivals of the Husayni family.

== Political career ==
Nasashibi was elected to the General Assembly of the Ottoman Empire in 1914, serving until the end of Ottoman Rule in Palestine in 1918.

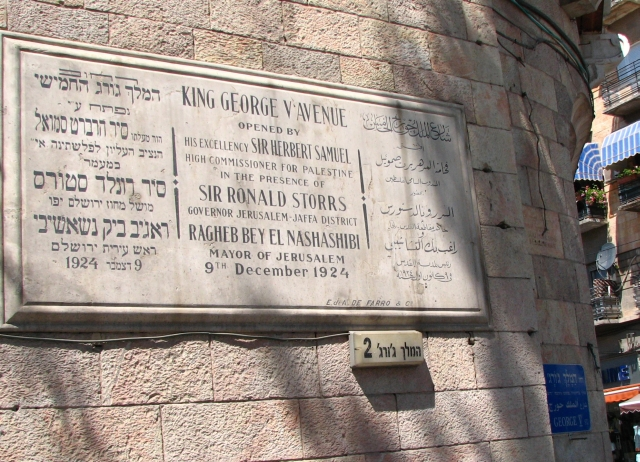
King George Street in Jerusalem, dedicated in the presence of Mayor al-Nashashibi, 1924

Nashashibi succeeded Musa Kazim al-Husayni as mayor of Jerusalem in 1920, and was elected to the post in the 1927 Municipal elections. Haym Salomon and Jacob Faradj were elected as vice-mayors. He sought re-election as Mayor and to the City Council in 1934, but lost his seat in the city council to Hussein Khalidi. He subsequently appealed the results to the Jerusalem District Court. Which ruled in Khalidi's favor in January 1935. Nashashibi was subsequently succeeded as Mayor by Khalidi later that month.

He was a leading opponent of the Husayni family in Palestine. In 1937 he secretly favoured union with Transjordan. Nashashibi was a founding member of the Arab Higher Committee and a leader of the National Defence Party.

Following the outbreak of the Arab–Israeli War, Nashashibi fled to Egypt. He subsequently returned to the West Bank, and was appointed head of the new Jordanian ministry for refugees and rehabilitation in August 1949. That September, he was appointed the first Governor-General for Arab Palestine. In 1950 he became Jordanian Minister of Agriculture and later Minister of Transport. He was also appointed as custodian of the Holy Places of Jerusalem with cabinet rank.

== Personal life ==
Nashashibi had two wives. With his first wife, a Jew called Ida Aldoroti, he had three sons called Munjed, Adnan and the eldest Mansur. His second wife was called Alice. Nasashibi died in April 1951 of illness at Augusta Victoria Hospital in East Jerusalem.

== Bibliography ==
- Sayigh, Yezid (2000). Armed Struggle and the Search for State: The Palestinian National Movement, 1949-1993. Oxford: Oxford University Press. ISBN 0-19-829643-6
- Nashāshībī, Nāṣir al-Dīn (1990). Jerusalem's Other Voice: Ragheb Nashashibi and Moderation in Palestinian Politics, 1920-1948. Ithaca Press. ISBN 978-0-86372-117-5.

== See also ==
- Pro-Jerusalem Society (1918-1926) - Nashashibi, as city mayor, was a member of its leading Council
