= Mohammad Zuhdi Nashashibi =

Palestinian banker and politician (1925–2020)

- محمد زهدي النشاشيبي

Minister of Finance
- In office 5 July 1994 – 13 June 2002
- President: Yasser Arafat
- Preceded by: Michel Abikarios (1948)
- Succeeded by: Salam Fayyad

Personal details
- Born: 1925 Jerusalem, Mandatory Palestine
- Died: 27 January 2020 (aged 94–95) Amman, Jordan
- Party: Fatah
- Profession: Politician, banker

Mohammad Zuhdi Nashashibi (1925 – 27 January 2020), also known as Abu Zuhdi, was a Palestinian politician and banker. He served as the Minister of Finance of the Palestinian National Authority from 5 July 1994 to 13 June 2002.

== Biography ==
Zuhdi Nashashibi was born on 1925 in Jerusalem in a Nashashibi family. He worked in Commercial Bank of Syria.

Zuhdi Nashashibi started his career at Syrian Ba'ath Party in early sixties. Later, he became a member of the executive council of Palestine Liberation Organization. He became the head of its economics department. He was the chairman of Palestinian National Fund too.

Zuhdi Nashashibi returned to his homeland after the Oslo Accords in 1994. He was appointed as the Minister of Finance of the Palestinian National Authority on 5 July 1994. He served in that post until 13 June 2002.

Zuhdi Nashashibi died on 27 January 2020 at the age of 95.

Political offices
Vacant Title last held by Michel Abikarios	Minister of Finance; 1994–2002	Succeeded by Salam Fayyad
