= Yunus al-Katib al-Mughanni =

Iranian composer and writer (8th century)

Yunus al-Katib al-Mughanni يونس الكاتب المغنّي
- Born: Medina
- Died: Damascus
- Years active: fl. first half of the 8th century CE

Yunus al-Katib al-Mughanni (Arabic: يونس الكاتب المغنّي; fl. first half of the 8th century) was a composer, poet-musician and writer on music during the later Umayyad Caliphate. Along with those of Ibn Surayj, the songs of Yūnus were among the most celebrated of his time and highly praised by the al-Fihrist compendium. Particularly taken by them was Al-Walid II, upon the latter's ascension to caliph in 743, Yunus stayed at the Damascus court until his death.

== ‌Biography ==
He was born and grown up in Medina. He was the son of a jurist (faqih) of Persian origin and a mawla (non-Arab, Muslim freedman or client) of the family of al-Zubayr ibn al-Awwam. Since he was a scribe in local divan, he became known as "al-katib". But soon he became interested in music and took lessons from Ma'bad, Ibn Suraydi, Ibn Muhriz, al-Gharid and Muhammad ibn Abbad al-katib. During a trip to Syria at the time of Caliph Hisham ibn Abd al-Malik (r. 724–743), his fame on music brought him the patronage of Caliph al-Walid II. This event is mentioned in the book of One Thousand and One Nights in 684th and 685th nights.

He was still alive in the early years of Abbasid Caliphate (post 750) and his best pupil was Siyat who in turn was a teacher of Ibrahim al-Mawsili.

Beside music, he was also a famous poet.

== Works ==
- Kitab al-Nagham (partly survived)
- Kitab al-Kian
- Kitab al-Mudjarrad Yunus
- Kitab fi 'l-Aghani (also called Diwan Yunus, according to Ibn Khordadbeh, this book contained 825 song texts by 35 singers)
