= St. George's School, Jerusalem =

Coordinates: 31°47′16.35″N 35°13′40.58″E

St. George's School Jerusalem
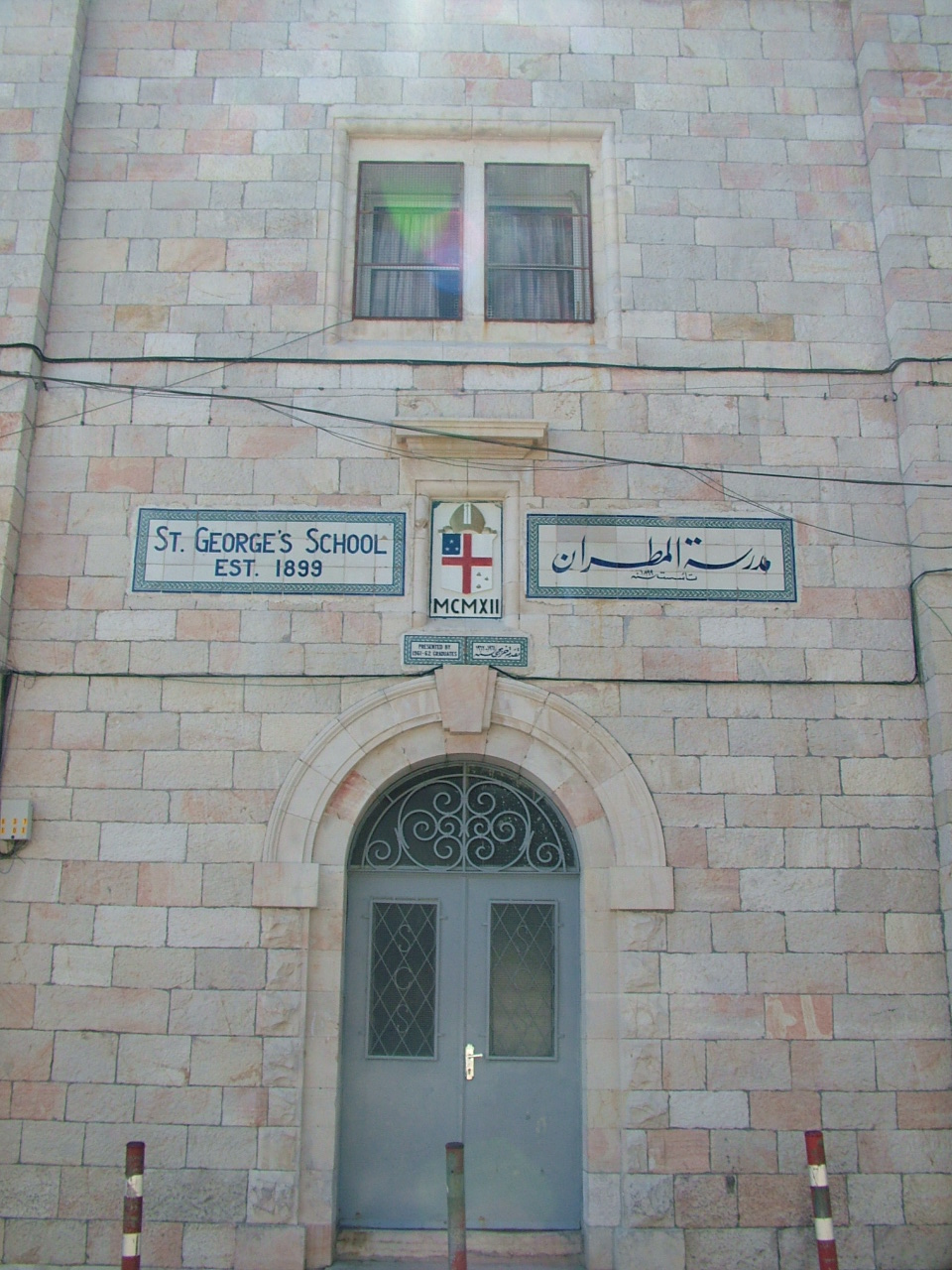

Location
- 18 Nablus Road; Jerusalem

Information
- School type: Private school
- Religious affiliation: Christian
- Denomination: Anglican
- Founded: 1899
- Principal: The Very Reverend Hosam Naoum
- Grades: Grade R to Grade 12
- Language: English, Arabic, Hebrew
- Campus type: Urban
- School fees: 4-6K (Israeli Shekel)
- Website: www.j-diocese.org/index.php?lang=en

St. George's School (Arabic: مدرسة المطران Madrasat al-Mutran) is a British boys' school in East Jerusalem run by the Anglican diocese of Jerusalem.

St. George's School is located next to St. George's College, just outside the walls of the Old City of Jerusalem. The school was established in 1899. The Rev. Wilbert Awdry, author of The Railway Series, taught at the school in 1933–1936. Built in the affluent Sheikh Jarrah neighborhood, it served as a place where Jerusalem's Christians and Muslims would send their sons for secondary education.

The school currently runs the regular Tawjihi program.

== Notable alumni ==
- Dimitri Baramki
- Ziad Rafiq Beydoun
- Kamal Boullata
- Emil Ghuri
- Ismail Khalidi
- Manoug Manougian
- Mufid Nashashibi
- Sari Nusseibeh
- Stav Prodromou
- Edward Said
- Ibrahim Touqan
- Nasser Sabah Al-Ahmad Al-Sabah
- Izzat Tannous
- Nido Qubein

== See also ==
- St. George's College, Jerusalem

== Bibliography ==
- Bussow, Johann (2011). Hamidian Palestine: Politics and Society in the District of Jerusalem 1872-1908. BRILL. ISBN 978-9004205697.
