= Ibrahim ibn Wahb al-Katib =

Abu ’l-Ḥusayn Isḥāq ibn Ibrāhīm ibn Sulaymān ibn Wahb al-Kātib (Arabic: إبراهيم بن وهب الكاتب) (flourished in the second half of the tenth century CE, d. after 946–947), commonly known as Ibn Wahb al-Kātib, is noted as the author of the rhetorical treatise Kitāb al-Burhān fī wujūh al-bayān (كِتَاب البُرهَان فِي وُجُوهِ البَيَان) — The Book of the Demonstration of the Aspects of Bayān.

== Life ==
Ibn Wahb al-Kātib came from a distinguished family of scribes and secretaries. His grandfather Sulaymān had been a minister to al-Muhtadī and al-Muʿtamid, but had been imprisoned during the reign of al-Muwaffaq, dying in prison in 905. Little is known of ibn Wahb's own life, but his Kitāb al-Burhān fī wujūh al-bayān was composed after the death of ʿAlī ibn ʿĪsā ibn dāʾūd ibn al-jarrāḥ (1 August 946).

== Work ==
According to his surviving writing, ibn Wahb was author of works entitled Kitāb al-Ḥujja, Kitāb al-Īḍāḥ, Kitāb al-Taʿabbud and Kitāb Asrār al-Ḳurʾān. It appears that these are lost (and not mentioned by other sources). However, ibn Wahb's Kitāb al-Burhān fī wujūh al-bayān, also known as Naqd al-nathr (كتاب نقد النثر, Book on Prose Criticism), survives; it is a study of Arabic style, rhetoric, and the art of the secretary composed from a Shīʿī perspective, and attempts to deploy Greek, Muʿtazilī and Imāmī ideas in examining Arabic writing. This work was in the early twentieth century misattributed to ibn Wahb's contemporary Qudama ibn Ja'far, until a more complete manuscript was discovered in the Chester Beatty Collection by ʿAlī Ḥasan ʿAbd al-Qādir, showing the correct attribution.

=== Editions ===
- ʾAbū ʾal-Faraj Qudāmah̲ bin Jaʻfar ʾal-Kātib ʾal-Bag︠h︡dādī [misattributed], Kitāb naqd ʾal-nat︠h︡r, ed. by Ṭaha Ḥusayn wa-ʻAbd ʼal-Ḥamīd ʼal-ʻAbbādī (Būlāq: ʼal-Maṭbaʻah ʼal-ʼAmīrīyah, 1941).
- al-Burhān fā wujūh al-bayān, ed. by Aḥmad Maṭlūb and Khadīja al-Ḥadīthī (Baghdad: Maṭbaʿat al-ʿīnī, 1967).
- al-Burhān fā wujūh al-bayān, ed. by Ḥifnī Muḥammad Sharaf (Cairo, 1969).
