= 1951 Jordanian general election =

Elections

General elections were held in Jordan on 29 August 1951. As political parties were banned at the time, all candidates ran as independents, although some affiliated with the Jordanian Communist Party, the Ba'ath Party the Arab Constitutional Party and the Umma Party all won seats.
