= Reform Party (Mandatory Palestine) =

Reform Party حزب الإصلاح العربي
- Founder: Husayn al-Khalidi
- Founded: 23 June 1935
- Dissolved: 1 October 1937
- Ideology: Palestinian nationalism Arab nationalism Anti-Zionism; Social democracy Reformism; Left-wing nationalism
- Political position: Left-wing

The Reform Party (or Hizb-al-Islah) was established by Husayn al-Khalidi in Palestine on 23 June 1935.

At the time of the party's formation, al-Khalidi was mayor of Jerusalem. It did not have a large following outside Jerusalem but its views were widely published in the Arab press. Its program called for freedom for Palestine, self-government, welfare for farmers and workers, encouragement of education and opposition to a Jewish national home.

From its formation on 25 April 1936, al-Khalidi was a member of the Arab Higher Committee as the party's representative. On 1 October 1937, following disturbances and violence during the 1936–39 Arab revolt in Palestine, the British Mandate administration outlawed the AHC and several other Arab political parties and arrested a number of Arab political leaders. The Reform Party was one of the parties dissolved and Khalidi was one of the leaders arrested. He was removed as mayor of Jerusalem and deported to the Seychelles, together with four other Arab nationalist political leaders.
