= Killing of Layla al-Khatib =

Killing of Palestinian toddler

- Layla al-Khatib, photo courtesy of family
- Location: Jenin, West Bank, Palestine
- Date: 25 January 2025
- Attack type: Shooting
- Perpetrators: Israel Defense Forces

On 25 January 2025, Israeli forces fired during a raid in Jenin, killing the 2-year-old Layla al-Khatib. The Israel Defense Forces (IDF) stated that a soldier had fired at the house: "where, according to intel, a wanted terrorist was barricading himself". According to a B'Tselem investigation, the only man present in the building was Layla's grandfather Bassam 'As'us.

== Background ==
During the Gaza war, Israel has carried out multiple ground incursions in the Israeli-occupied West Bank. According to the United Nations (UN), over 1000 West Bank Palestinians have been killed since the conflict began, mostly by Israeli settler violence or the Israel Defense Forces (IDF). In Jenin and surrounding villages, the IDF killed at least 6 children during the Gaza war before January 2025.

== Shooting ==
On the evening of 25 January 2025, the Israel Defense Forces (IDF) entered the Muthallath al-Shuhada village in the Jenin Governorate, where the 'A'sus family gathered for dinner in their second story apartment. After hearing gunfire outside, the family sat on the floor. Gunfire erupted towards the house. The Israeli military claims that soldiers called out warnings to residents before opening fire, however al-Khatib's family disputes that claim. Al-Khatib's mother and aunt were lightly wounded by shrapnel, while al-Khatib was shot in the head. The Palestinian Ministry of Health released a statement saying that al-Khatib died from those "critical wounds".

Immediately after al-Khatib was shot in the head, her grandfather carried her outside the apartment to seek medical attention. In an interview with CNN, he said that he encountered dozens of soldiers surrounding the house. He stated that he asked one of the soldiers: "Why are you killing my daughter?", and alleged that the soldier replied: "I am sorry". Neighborhood residents accused Israeli forces of trying to cover up the event. A video obtained by CNN shows a soldier attempting to destroy a security camera near the event with the butt of his rifle.

== Investigations ==
According to Haaretz: "The Israeli army stated that troops had surrounded a house and fired at a building where, based on intelligence, a terrorist was believed to be holed up", according to Haaretz. The military also claimed that, once realizing al-Khatib was injured, soldiers called the Palestinian Red Crescent Society (PRCS) and evacuated the injured girl with her "pregnant mother". They stated that they would investigate the incident, and as of 6 October 2025 the military has said that it is still investigating Al-Khatib's case.

An independent investigation by B'Tselem found that al-Khatib was evacuated by civilian car. Her mother, who was not pregnant, was taken by an ambulance summoned by family members. Furthermore, the investigation found that no one was barricaded in the house that evening, and the only man present in the residence was al-Khatib's grandfather.

An investigation by the United Nations found that Israeli authorities had not ensured independent and effecti

== See also ==
- Outline of the Gaza war
- Timeline of the Israeli–Palestinian conflict in 2025
- Timeline of the Gaza war (19 January 2025 – 17 March 2025)
- Israeli incursions in the West Bank during the Gaza war
