= Sulaiman Khateeb =

- Born: 26 December 1922; Chitguppa, Bidar, Karnataka
- Died: 22 October 1978 (aged 55)
- Occupation: Poet
- Years active: 1952
- Spouse: Rasheeda

Sulaiman Khateeb (1922–1978) was an Urdu, Deccani poet.
