= Henry Cattan =

Palestinian jurist and writer

- Born: 1906; Jerusalem
- Died: April 17, 1992 (aged 85–86)
- Occupations: jurist and writer

Henry Cattan (1906 – April 17, 1992) was a Palestinian jurist and writer who wrote extensively on legal issues of the Israeli-Palestinian conflict during the 1900s and was a prominent advocate for the state of Palestine.

== Life ==
Cattan was born in early 1906 in Jerusalem, Ottoman Empire, in the Mutasarrifate of Jerusalem administrative district. He was educated at the University of Paris and the University of London.

After qualifying as a barrister, Cattan established a legal practice in Jerusalem in 1932. He lectured at the Jerusalem Law School from 1932 to 1942, practising law in Palestine and Syria, and was a member of the Palestine Law Council until 1948.

In the 1948 Palestine war, Cattan became a refugee as part of the 1948 Palestinian expulsion and flight. He established a new practice in Damascus, Syria, and later in Beirut, Lebanon. Upon the move to Lebanon, Cattan specialized in oil and gas law. ARAMCO and the Trans-Arabian Pipe Line Company had him on retainer for several years to consult on legal issues surrounding the companies' expansion into the Middle East. Cattan later wrote two books on the subject in 1967: The Law of Oil Concessions in the Middle East and North Africa and The Evolution of Oil Concessions in the Middle East and North Africa.

Cattan testified before the Anglo-American Committee of Inquiry in 1946. Cattan was a member of the delegation which represented the Arab Higher Committee before the United Nations General Assembly in 1947 and 1948.

Cattan died on April 17, 1992 in Paris.

== Selected publications ==
- Palestine, the Arabs, and Israel (1969)
- The Palestine Question (1988)
- Palestine: The Road to Peace
- Palestine and International Law
- The Status of Jerusalem (1981)
