= Emil Ghuri =

Palestinian politician

- إميل غوري

Secretary-General of the Arab Higher Committee
- Preceded by: Amin al-Husseini

Secretary-General of the Palestine Arab Party

Personal details
- Born: 1907 Jerusalem, Ottoman Empire
- Died: 1984 (aged 76–77)

Emil Ghuri (Arabic: إميل غوري; 1907–1984) was a Palestinian politician who served as secretary-general of the Arab Higher Committee (AHC), the official leadership of the Arabs in Palestine.

== Biography ==
Born in Jerusalem in 1907, Ghuri was the secretary-general of the Palestine Arab Party. He co-edited the Al Liwaa newspaper between 1935 and 1937. He was one of the contributors of the Jerusalem based biweekly Al Awqat Al Arabiyya.

In May 1947, Ghuri was nominated by the AHC as a member of its delegation to represent it before the United Nations General Assembly in its special session for Palestine in 1947 and 1948. Other individuals nominated for this delegation included Jamal al-Husayni, Henry Cattan, Wasef Kamal, Issa Nakhleh and Rasem Khalidi. He was the representative of the AHC until 1968. He died in Amman, Jordan, in 1984.
