= Marjan al-Katib al-Islami =

Marjan al-Katib al-Islami (Persian: Marjan Kateb Islami) a famous female Iranian calligrapher who lived in Safavid Persia under 17th century. She was active in the period around 1670.

== Works ==
In August 2005 a copy of Koran transcribed by Marjan al-Kateb al-Islami was on display at the Astan-e Qods Razavi Museum in Mashhad. The holy verses were transcribed with a unique style of calligraphy and illumination on 20 x 31.5 centimeter sheets of Samarkand paper.
