= Dania Khatib =

Lebanese singer (born 1973)

Dania Khatib دانية الخطيب
- Born: February 13, 1973 (age 53)
- Origin: Lebanon
- Genres: Lebanese, Arabic music
- Occupations: Singer, and actress
- Label: EMI Music

Dania Khatib (Arabic: دانية الخطيب; born February 13, 1973) is a Lebanese singer and actress. She began her career as a TV presenter for a local station in Lebanon. She joined Channel V in 1995, becoming the first Arabic VJ on an international TV channel. In 1998, she left Channel V to join Abu Dhabi TV where she presented the Arabic entertainment program Zoom, for which she received the silver award for "Most Entertaining Arabic Program" at the Cairo TV & Radio Festival, 1998. Dania now presents Al Qafila, a travel program for Abu Dhabi TV.

As a musician she records under the name of Dania. Her debut single, "Yalla Bina", was released in October 1996. Her self-titled album, Dania was released in September 1997. A second album, Dania II, was released in June 1999. This album included the track "Leily" and "Private Number", a duet with British boy band 911. A compilation, The Best of Dania, was released in November 2005. All of the albums were released by EMI music Arabia. Another Lebanese-born singer, Dania Abu-Shaheen, has released an album (Expatriate), using the name Dania.
