= Samira Alkhatib =

Palestinian poet (1945–2021)

Samira Al-Khatib
- سميرة الخطيب
- Born: 1945; Quds
- Died: 2021 (aged 75–76); United States
- Citizenship: Palestine
- Occupation: Poet
- Notable work: The Adulterous Village; 40 Poems to Mishaal

Samira Al-Khatib (Arabic: سميرة الخطيب) was born in 1945 in Jerusalem and died in 2021 in the United States of America. She was a Palestinian poet and writer who was well known for her literary and cultural resistance to Israel's rule.

== Early life and education ==
Samira Al - Khatib was born in Jerusalem. At some point, she emigrated to the United States of America. From there, she began her contributions to the Palestinian question in international forums and among American public opinion, alongside another Palestinian poet Rashed Hussain.

== Career ==
Samira Al-Khatib began her career in writing, and publishing in general, and in poetry in particular, early when she published some of her poems in the Literary Bayader magazine. In most of her texts, Samira has adhered to the Palestinian national position in support of the causes, concerns, and dreams of her people.

In her poems, Samira Al-Khatib addressed Palestinian life and patriotic themes, and, as some critics have mentioned, tried to inflame her poems with Palestinian sentiments, as well as to employ heritage and civilizational symbols of expression.

Samira and a group of Palestinian intellectuals founded the Galilee Cultural Fund, which aimed to educate Palestinian youth from Galilee and Triangle and help them continue their academic studies. She worked for some time in the UAE newspaper "Unity," and in the London magazine "Al - Zafara."

In 1963, Samira broke into the premises of a local radio station with an Algerian friend, but they were unable to operate the equipment. Samira's father was called on the second day and paid bail to release her. She moved to cultural protest by writing an emotional story called "Lealina". She said that when some of those interested in literature in Palestine saw her, they asked her about the real writer. Samira wrote her first novel, Where the Sun Rises, in 1966, where she wrote some English chapters.

In 1975, Samira moved to the legal profession in an attempt to defend the Palestinian cause. She said in one of the discussions with a local newspaper that the sharp conversations she had with the Zionists enabled her to deal with them firmly and that her proficiency in the Hebrew language enabled her to read most books. Samira was arrested by soldiers in the Israel Defense Forces who confiscated all her papers, including two poetry collections, The Adulterous Village and 40 Poems to Mishaal and the manuscript "Gentlemen Step Down, I Will Hold the reins", along with her school certificates and some medical reports.

Samira moved to live in the United Kingdom in August 1977 until November 1979, where she worked as a journalist at the newspaper Al-Manar, owned by Riad Al-Rayes, then worked at the July 23 magazine. Besides this, she lectured on the Palestinian issue at a number of universities and forums. After that, Samira Al-Khatib traveled to the United Arab Emirates and worked for the newspaper Al-Wahda and the magazine Al-Dhafra, which was published by Muhammad Mahfouz and issued from London.

During her life, Samira Al-Khatib was one of the most prominent Palestinian poets, along with Li Karnik, Fadwa Toukan, and Laila Alloush.

== Works ==
This is a shortlist of the most prominent works of the Palestinian writer and poet Samira al-Khatib:

- The Adulterous Village
- 40 Poems to Mishaal
