= Trial of Kinda El-Khatib =

Legal process against Lebanese activist

Kinda El-Khatib (Arabic: كندة الخطيب; born 1996/7), a Lebanese activist, was convicted in December 2020 of collaboration with Israel. El-Khatib, a critic of Michel Aoun, the political class of Lebanon, and Hezbollah, was released on appeal in March 2021.

== Background ==
El-Khatib is a Sunni Muslim from Akkar District, and took part in demonstrations in 2019 and 2020. At the time of her arrest, according to her sister Yasmine, El-Khatib was 23 years old, and was a Masters student in English Literature at the Lebanese University. She had worked for a time in 2018 as a translator for the International Society for Parliamentary Elections.

== Arrest and trial ==
With her brother Bandar, El-Khatib was arrested by the General Directorate of General Security on 17 June 2020. Bandar was released the following day, but Kinda was detained for six months, before being brought before a military tribunal.

El-Khatib is known as a social media commentator. Her arrest was attributed at the time to a retweet of a posting by Avichay Adraee. She had been particularly active on Twitter since the 17 October Revolution protests of 2019.

There were reports in Al Akhbar in September that El-Khatib was accused of facilitating an interview that Charbel Al-Hajj, who is Lebanese, had given on Israeli television. Brought to trial in a military tribunal in December 2020, in her defence El-Khatib testified on a contact made via Twitter, from a Kan 11 Israeli journalist named Roy Kays (also Roy Case, Roi Kais, he:רועי קייס), whom she did not know. She denied completely charges of entering Israel, and meeting Israelis whom she gave security information. After her conviction, and sentence of three years in prison with hard labour, her lawyer Jocelyne Rahi announced they would appeal. The court also handed down a sentence of ten years to Charbel Al-Hajj (known as Charbel Hage), a Lebanese citizen in the United States, tried in absentia.

== Appeal ==
Kinda El-Khatib was freed on 16 March 2021, under caution, after a successful appeal to the Court of Cassation. It was announced that there would be a second trial, with no date set. A review of the position of her case in August 2021, on the website of The National, reported that in April of that year the military tribunal indictment was read to journalists at the Military Cassation Court. The second trial, set for 8 April, was postponed to December. Support for El-Khatib as a critical voice was expressed by Nizar Zakka and David Schenker.
