= Ahmad Shafik Al-Khatib =

Palestinian-Lebanese lexicographer

- Born: 1926
- Died: June 13, 2015 (aged 88–89)
- Citizenship: Palestinian (1926–1945), Lebanese (1945–2015)
- Occupation: lexicographer

Ahmad Shafik Al-Khatib (Arabic: أحمد شفيق الخطيب) (1926–2015) was a Palestinian-Lebanese lexicographer.

== Life ==
Khatib was born in Al-Qubeiba village in Palestine in 1926. His father is Imam Shafeeq Al-Khatib and his mother is Amina Al-Huraidi. He married Shereen Irani, with whom he had three sons. He studied his secondary school in Arabic. He studied in Friends school in Ramallah in English. Ahmad lived in Lebanon since 1945. When the Nakba occurred, he had already finished his third year in the science department. He had to drop out and work as a teacher of science in Makassed Islamic college in Sidon. He took over the administration of the college internal department from 1949 to 1951. In 1956, he got his bachelor's degree in science from the American University of Beirut. He also got his master's degree in literature from the same university in 1958.

In 1964, he worked as a scientific advisor in the publishing department In the Lebanon library. Later, he became the head of the dictionaries section. He also worked as a secretary of the Lions Club from its foundation in 1960 until the mid-seventies and was a member of the Lebanese Red Cross. Moreover, he worked as a secretary, vice-president, and president of the Academy of the Arabic Language in Cairo, and a member of the Academy of the Arabic Language in Jordan.

== Works ==
- A Dictionary of Scientific, Technical and Engineering Terms (1971).
- A Dictionary of Petroleum and Petroleum Industry Terms (1975).
- Al-Mufeed dictionary, with the participation of Dr. Raja Nasr.
- Learner's Dictionary for the pocket, with A.W. Fairuzbi.
- 12 different dictionaries in chemistry, geology, physics, plants, animals, biology, astronomy, satellite channels, computer sciences, nutrition, mathematics, and geography, which were issued between 1978 and 1994.
- Al-Shihabi dictionary of agricultural terms.
- The new medical Hatta dictionary, with the participation of Dr. Yosuf Hatta (1989).
- UNESCO reference in science education (1968).
- UNESCO new reference in science education (1977).
- Scientific and technological education in national development (1984).
- King Fahd and the achievement journey in the Kingdom of Saudi Arabia (1990).
- List of energy terms (1988).
- Energy dictionary (1994).

== Honor ==
His name is recorded in the mural of honor in the American University of Beirut. Moreover, under the patronage of the deceased Prime Minister Rafic Hariri, the Lebanese National Commission for UNESCO organized a ceremony in Khatib's honor, in cooperation with the Lebanon Library and Beirut Translation School. Furthermore, he was awarded Joseph Zaarour Medal for the best-distinguished work in the field of dictionaries and translation. In addition, Saint Joseph University of Beirut gave him a commemorative shield.

== Death ==
At the age of 89, Khatib died on 13< June 2015.
