= Jamal al-Husayni =

Palestinian politician

- جمال الحُسيني
- Al-Husayni in 1936

Minister of Foreign Affairs
- In office 22 September 1948 – October 1948
- President: Amin al-Husseini
- Prime Minister: Ahmed Hilmi Pasha
- Preceded by: Office established
- Succeeded by: "Office abolished in 1959"

Personal details
- Born: 1892 Jerusalem, Ottoman Empire
- Died: 1982 (aged 89–90) Saudi Arabia
- Children: Serene Husseini Shahid
- Relatives: Saleh al-Husayni (brother); Musa Alami (brother-in-law); Musa al-Husayni (uncle); Hussein al-Husayni (uncle); Abd al-Qadir al-Husayni (cousin)

Jamal al-Husayni (Arabic: جمال الحُسيني) 1892–1982) was a Palestinian Arab politician who was born in Jerusalem and was a member of the Husayni family.

Husayni served as Secretary to the Executive Committee of the Palestine Arab Congress (1921–1934) and to the Muslim Supreme Council. He was co-founder and chairman of the Palestine Arab Party, established in Jerusalem in 1935, and in 1937 became a member of the first Arab Higher Committee, led by Amin al-Husayni, later becoming its chairman.

During the 1936-39 Arab revolt he escaped first to Syria (1937) and then to Baghdad, Iraq (1939). He led the Arab delegation to the 1939 London Conference and was Palestinian representative to the Anglo-American Committee of Enquiry. Husayni was arrested by the British in 1941 and exiled to Southern Rhodesia. He was released at the end of World War II and returned to Mandatory Palestine in 1946. He was an unofficial delegate to the United Nations in 1947-48. In September–October 1948 he was the foreign minister in the Egyptian-sponsored All-Palestine Government.

== Youth ==
Husayni was born in 1894 into the Husayni family, one of the most influential families in Jerusalem. He went to the Church of England school, St George's, where he was the first pupil to wear western-style clothes and where he became an enthusiastic player of the new sport – football. On finishing his secondary education, aged eighteen, he entered the Syrian Protestant College in Beirut to study medicine. At that time the Medical faculty was alive with debate about the status of Arabs under a Government based in Istanbul and dominated by Turks and Turkish. Jamal became a member of the Nadi Al-Arabi (the Arab Club of Damascus) and al-Muntada al-Adabi movements in 1918-19 which, according to Isaac Friedman, were "hostile to British rule and who wanted to reinstate Turkish rule in the former Ottoman Nadi Al-Arabian Asiatic provinces." During the time of Jamal's membership, al-Muntada al-Arabi were committed to the concepts of pan-Arabism and anti-Zionism and supported a new Greater Syrian nation under King Faisal. In May 1919 this political activity was such that the British government prohibited any further meetings, speeches, or public activities by the club.

In December 1914, two years into Jamal's studies, Ottoman Turk guards raided the college arresting anyone suspected belonged to a secret Arab nationalist organization, and Jamal fled to Jerusalem.

In 1915 four of Jamal's fellow-members of the Beirut branch of the al-Muntada al-Arabi were hanged for treason by Djemal Pasha. During the First World War he was conscripted into the Turkish Army and later taken prisoner by the British.

Jamal and his peer group moved in elite Palestinian circles. His relative, Amin was to become head of the Supreme Muslim Council. His brother-in-law, Musa Alami, worked in the British administration and rose to become personal secretary to the High Commissioner. Musa's wife was the daughter of Ihsan Al-Jabri one of the Arab delegates to the League of Nations.

Later his young cousin Abd al-Qadir was to become a Palestinian military leader fighting the British in 1936-39 and the emerging Israelis in 1948.

== 1920s ==
By 1921, aged 27, he had become a senior figure in Palestinian politics. His uncle, Musa Kazim, an Ottoman administrator and under the British, briefly, Mayor of Jerusalem, was chairman of the Executive Committee of the Palestine Arab Congress formed by the Muslim-Christian Associations, which had been established following the arrival of the British. Jamal was appointed Secretary to the Executive. Jamal and Musa Kazim were at this time considered the foremost representatives of the Palestinian Arab community. Following the disturbances of 1921, also known as the Jaffa Riots, Jamal had a meeting with the High Commissioner, Sir Herbert Samuel, and issued a statement calling for calm.

At the 6th Congress in 1923 he was one of the delegates calling for a tax strike, demanding Arab representation in the administration. The proposed strike was abandoned in the face of opposition from the major land owners who dominated the Congress. Instead it chose to boycott proposed elections for a Legislative Council and in June all the Arab members of the British Advisory Council resigned their positions.

During this period the British regarded him as reasonable and pragmatic. In 1923 he made an extended visit to India and met many Muslim leaders.

In 1924 he met with Jewish Agency member Haim Kalvarisky to present proposals for the structure of a Legislative Council. It would have two chambers, the lower would be elected with the High Commissioner having power of veto over its decisions. The upper chamber would consist of ten members selected on a communal basis with two of the members representing the Jewish community. Immigration would be controlled by a commission. These proposals were rejected by the Jewish Agency. But by this time Jamal had become disillusioned with the Executive Committee and had to be persuaded to keep his position as secretary. One of his complaints was lack of funds for administration.

As well as his political activities Jamal also pursued a career as an advocate. In 1927 he petitioned the High Court for the removal of the Hebrew letters 'EI' from the newly issued Palestine stamps. The two letters, followed the word 'Palestine' in Hebrew and stood for Eretz Israel - “Land of Israel”. The petition was rejected.

In 1929, just prior to the rioting over Zionist activity at the Wailing Wall, the deputy High Commissioner, H.C. Luke, organised a lengthy meeting between Arab and Jewish Agency leaders in attempt to calm the situation. The Arab delegation was led by Jamal. The hoped for joint statement did not materialize. Following the riots, in October, he was leader of a delegation sent to London for meetings at the Colonial Office. This was in his capacity as Secretary to the Supreme Muslim Council, an organisation which had been set up by the British, and was led by Hajj Amin Husseini, to whom he was related both through his father and mother. It was the first Palestinian Arab delegation to go to London since 1922 and included Adil Arslan and Izzat Tannous. One of its objectives was the setting up of an information center in London.

== 1930s ==
At the end of 1930 Jamal had further meetings in London with British officials who liked his conciliatory approach. He agreed to proposals for a round table conference with members of the Jewish Agency. His one condition was that the Jewish delegates should come from Palestine and specifically that Weizmann should not be a member since this would be an act of recognition of validity of Zionist claims over Palestine. He returned to Palestine, in January 1931, feeling progress had been made. At this time he was also active as a journalist. In 1933 he published a series of anonymous articles in the Damascus newspaper Alif Ba in which he accused Awni Abd al-Hadi, leader of the new Independence Party, Istiqlal, of selling 40,000 dunum of land in Wadi Hawarith to the Jewish Agency six years earlier. A 1937 Jewish Agency list has Jamal's name as having acted as an attorney in a similar land sale. It is an indication of how much information the Jewish Agency was collecting. Another example is a file which records discussions at an Executive Committee meeting, 12 April 1933, at which the imminent meeting, organised by Haim Arlosoroff, between Chaim Weizmann and leaders from Transjordan was discussed. The notes indicate that Jamal argued that the committee had no influence over tribal leaders east of the Jordan and that the meeting should be ignored.

In October 1934 the Executive Committee called for demonstrations against government policy. The authorities responded by arresting Jamal al-Husayni whom they held responsible.

In April 1935 he launched the Palestine Arab Party, Al Hisb Al-Arabi Al Falastini to represent the Husseini power bloc. The party was not the first mass-membership Palestinian Arab political party. It had been preceded by Istiqlal (1932) and the National Defence Party, Hazb al-defa al Watany, (1934) as Palestinian Arabs began organising themselves into political parties after the decline of the National Congress and the Muslim-Christian Associations. The party had offices in all the major Arab towns with a program calling for opposition to Zionism and the Mandate, Arab unity and an end of land sales to the Jewish Agency.

In December 1935 Jamal attended a memorial ceremony for Izz ad-Din al-Qassam in Haifa, and made a speech to the crowd of 6,000 in which he predicted that al-Qassam would become a symbol of Palestinian resistance. Following the crushing of the al-Qassam insurgency the Wauchope administration put forward new proposals for a legislative council coupled with restrictions on land sales. The Jewish Agency swiftly rejected the proposals while the Palestinian Arab Party did not reject them completely until April 1936 several months after they had been blocked by the United Kingdom's Houses of Parliament. The party appeared to be in closer touch with public opinion when, in 1936, it declined an invitation to talks with the Colonial Office in London which the other parties had accepted. A week later, on 21 April 1936, the party announced its support for the General Strike. Four days later the Higher Arab Committee was formed from the leadership of all the main factions. Hajj Amin was chairman and Awni Abd al-Hadi was secretary. One of the Committee's priorities was an end to Jewish immigration. Jamal later replaced Hadi as secretary following Hadi's internment at Sarafand military base in June 1936. At the same time a four-man delegation, including Jamal, were given visas to go to London for meetings at the Colonial Office to find a way of ending the strike. It is suggested that Jamal was forced to take a harder line than he wished due to pressure from more radical elements. The talks failed. On 1 October 1937 the authorities banned all Palestinian Arab nationalist organisations and Jamal went into exile.

Jamal, with his Pan-Arab views, advocated the dispersal of the Jews in Palestine across an independent, federated Arab World. Jamal had some contact with the pacifist president of Jerusalem's Hebrew University, Judah Magnes, and was possibly involved in proposals that Magnus presented to David Ben Gurion in 1935. In 1936 Jamal's brother in law, Musa Alami, held a series of meetings with Magnus at which a number of proposals were outlined, but neither Ben Gurion nor Jamal were willing to publicly endorse them. The move was overtaken by the strike and the establishment of the Arab Higher Committee. Zionist archives record an Arab source saying that Jamal was the only member of the committee who would not accept bribes. Sharett, head of the Jewish Agency Political Department, is quoted as saying that Jamal, and his cousin Hajj Amin, were the only honest Palestinian leaders. In 1937, following the end of the general strike, Jamal attempted to open negotiations with American Zionists with the help of the Brith Shalom group. His priority was to limit the number of Jews arriving in Palestine and to end land sales to Jewish organisations. In Jerusalem he edited a newspaper called Al Liwa.

In 1938 he set up an information office in Damascus which received some funds from the local German and Italian Consulates. Meanwhile, within Palestine the British and the Jewish Agency were funding 'Peace Bands' to combat the rebel's successes. During this period his proposals included pledges of equal rights for Jews in any future Palestine. In 1939 he led the Arab delegation to the London Conference following the failure of which the British Government announced its plans for the future of Palestine in a White Paper which included plans for a limit to Jewish immigration. By this time Jamal had become far more outspoken: “The Jews have turned Palestine into hell.” The outbreak of the Second World War ended all diplomatic activity related to Palestine and the British proposals were quietly shelved.

== After 1940 ==
In 1940 he and Amin al-Husayni moved to Baghdad where he held two weeks of meetings with Colonel Stewart Newcombe. Following these meeting both Jamal and Musa al-Alami agreed to the terms of the White Paper and both signed a copy of it in the presence of the Prime Minister of Iraq Nuri as-Said. The following year, following the collapse of the Rashidi revolt, he was amongst a group of eighty who fled to Tehran. On his continued attempt to escape the British he was taken prisoner at Ahwaz and interned in Southern Rhodesia where he was held until November 1945 when he was allowed to move to Cairo. In Egypt he built ties with the Muslim Brotherhood. The leader of the mainstream Wafd Party, Mustafa el-Nahhas, regarded him as an extremist. In 1945 the Arab Higher Council was reformed, once again dominated by traditional leaders from the 1930s.

He was not allowed back into Palestine until February 1946 where he represented the Arab case to the Anglo-American Commission. His presentation was poorly received, in particular when compared to that given by Henry Cattan. Also in 1946 he was invited as the Palestinian Arab delegate to the meeting of the Arab League, held at Bludan, Syria.

In 1946 Fawzi Husseini, an advocate of dialogue with the Jewish Agency, was assassinated. In an Egyptian newspaper Jamal was quoted as saying that Fawzi 'had strayed'. Other sources quote Jamal as being responsible for all actions taken against collaborators.

In Palestine he embarked on several measures to unify the nationalist movement. He merged the two main youth movements and took over the Land Bank set up by Ahmed Hilmi.

In 1947 the Arab Higher Committee was recognised by the British Government as representing Palestinian Arabs. Two months later it was recognised by the newly created United Nations and Jamal travelled to Lake Success, New York, as the spokesman for Palestinian Arabs to the UN.

Critics maintain that both Jamal and Amin al-Husayni failed to recognise the importance to the Haganah military operations at the beginning of 1948. Jamal's activities at the UN ended when in July he refused to attend any debates or meetings at which there were Israeli representatives.

He returned to Palestine where he was Foreign Minister for the short lived Palestinian Arab Government.

In 1950 he joined the entourage of King Abdul Aziz Ibn Saud of Saudi Arabia later becoming a close advisor to King Saud.

According to Jordanian intelligence reports, in 1954 Jamal funded a group that failed in an attempt to sabotage an Israeli Air Force base in the Jezreel Valley. The same source states that in July 1954 Jamal broke away from Amin al-Husayni and began working exclusively for the Saudis. According to Jordanian intelligence, from January 1955 he was given 1 million Lebanese pounds by the Saudis to finance sabotage raids on Israel from Lebanon. The money was paid to "middle men" but no attacks materialised.

== Bibliography ==
- Abcarius, M.F. (nd) Palestine. Through the Fog of Propaganda. Hutchinson.
- Antonius, George (1938) The Arab Awakening. The Story of the Arab National Movement. Hamish Hamilton. (1945 edition)
- Cohen, Aharon (1970) Israel and the Arab World. W.H. Allen. ISBN 0-491-00003-0.
- Buheiry, Marwan R. (1989) The Formation and Perception of the Modern Arab World. Studies by Marwan R Buheiry. Edited by Lawrence I. Conrad. Darwin Press, Princeton. ISBN 0-87850-064-2
- Friedman, Isaac (2012) British Miscalculations: The Rise of Muslim Nationalism, 1918-1925 Transaction Publishers. ISBN 978-1-4128-4749-0
- Gelber, Yoav (1997). Jewish-Transjordanian Relations 1921-48: Alliance of Bars Sinister. London: Routledge. ISBN 0-7146-4675-X
- Kayyali, Abdul-Wahhab Said (no date) Palestine. A Modern History Croom Helm. ISBN 086199-007-2.8
- Khalidi, Rashid (2006) The Iron Cage. The Story of the Palestinian Struggle for Statehood. Oneworld Publications. ISBN 978-1-85168-582-0
- Kimche, Jon and David (1950) Seven Fallen Pillars - The Middle East, 1915-1950. Secker and Warburg, London. (2nd edition)
- Kessler, Oren (2023) Palestine 1936: The Great Revolt and the Roots of the Middle East Conflict. Rowman & Littlefield. ISBN 1538148803
- Lacey, Robert (1981) The Kingdom. Hutchinson. ISBN 0-09-145790-4
- Morris, Benny (1993) Israel's Border Wars, 1949 - 1956. Arab Infiltration, Israeli Retaliation, and the Countdown to the Suez War. Oxford University Press, ISBN 0-19-827850-0
- Monroe, Elizabeth (1973) Philby of Arabia. Faber & Faber. (1980 Quartet edition).ISBN 0-7043-3346-5
- Pappe, Ilan (2002) The Rise and Fall of a Palestinian Dynasty. The Husaynis 1700–1948. AL Saqi edition 2010. ISBN 978-0-86356-460-4
- Segev, Tom (2000) One Palestine, Complete - Jews and Arabs under the British Mandate. Little, Brown & Co. ISBN 0-316-64859-0
- Teveth, Shabtai (1985) Ben-Gurion and the Palestinian Arabs. From Peace to War. Oxford University Press. ISBN 0-19-503562-3
- Sykes, Christopher (1965) Cross Roads to Israel: Palestine from Balfour to Bevin. New English Library Edition (pb) 1967

Political offices
New office	Minister of Foreign Affairs; 1948	Vacant Title next held by Nabil Shaath
