= Al-Hasan al-Katib =

Egyptian Sufi saint

ΑΙ-Hasan ibn Ali ibn Ahmad al-Katib (Arabic: الحسن بن علي بن أحمد الكاتب) (d. 11th century) more commonly known as al-Hasan al-Katib (الحسن الكاتب) was a Fatimid municipal secretary, philosopher of music and Sufi saint of Egypt. He learned the knowledge of Sufism from Rudbari. He is widely known for his book Kamal Adab al-Ghina (كمال آداب الغناء; lit. 'The Perfection of Musical Knowledge').
