= Anwar Khatib =

Palestinian politician (1917–1993)

Anwar al-Khatib
- أنور الخطيب
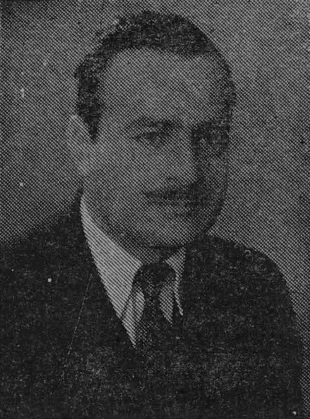

Governor of the Jerusalem District
- In office 1965–1988

Member of the Parliament of Jordan
- In office 1951–1954

Personal details
- Born: 1917 Hebron, Mutasarrifate of Jerusalem, Ottoman Empire
- Died: 7 February 1993 (aged 75–76) East Jerusalem
- Children: 3

Anwar al-Khatib al-Tamimi (Arabic: أنور الخطيب; 1917–7 February 1993) was a Palestinian politician who served as the Governor of the Jerusalem District from 1965 to 1988, and in the Parliament of Jordan from 1951 to 1954. He was the titular governor after Israel annexed East Jerusalem following the Six Day War.

== Early life ==
Anwar al-Khatib al-Tamimi was born in Hebron while it was under the control of the Ottoman Empire. He studied social science and law at the Arab College and graduated with a Bachelor of Laws degree in 1943. He worked as a teacher in Beersheba and Jerusalem while in college.

== Career ==
Khabit joined the Supreme Muslim Council and became its secretary in 1945. In 1946, he became a member of the Arab Higher Committee. Khabit was a founding board member of Hind al-Husseini's orphange Dar al-Tifl al-Arabi, which housed 55 survivors of the Deir Yassin massacre.

Khatib led a municipal executive committee and was mayor of Jerusalem from 1949 to 1950. King Abdullah I of Jordan appointed him as district commissioner of the Old City of Jerusalem. Khatib was appointed governor of the Jerusalem District in 1965.

Khatib was elected to the Parliament of Jordan in the 1951 election. From 1963 to 1964, he served as Jordan's ambassador to Egypt; he was the first person to hold the position. He served as a minister in multiple cabinets from 1961 to 1967, including as Minister of Economics and Construction.

Khatib stated that Hussein of Jordan joined the Six-Day War as he would be blamed if the Arab forces lost a war that Jordan did not participate in. Khatib was the highest-ranking Jordanian official in the West Bank at the time. He wanted to merge the city councils of East and West Jerusalem after Israel's annexation, but this was rejected and left East Jerusalem with no representation. On 1 August 1967, Khatib was expelled from Jerusalem on charges of "incitement to subversion". Khatib remained the titular governor until Jordan relinquished its claims to the West Bank in 1988.

In 1982, Khatib signed a document recognising the Palestine Liberation Organization as the legitimate representative of the Palestinian people. Khatib was an advisor to the Jordanian-Palestinian delegation at the Madrid Conference of 1991. Jordan selected him as Israel obected to including residents of Jerusalem as Palestinian delegates.

== Personal life ==
Khatib married and had three children. He died at the Makassed Hospital in East Jerusalem on 7 February 1993 after suffering a heart attack.

== Works cited ==
=== Books ===
- Posner, Steve (1987). Israel Undercover: Secret Warfare and Hidden Diplomacy in the Middle East. Syracuse University Press. ISBN 0815602200.
- Schor, Laura (2019). Sophie Halaby in Jerusalem: An Artist’s Life. Syracuse University Press. ISBN 9780815636533.

=== Journals ===
- "The Madrid Peace Conference". Journal of Palestine Studies. 21 (2). Taylor & Francis: 117–149. 1992. doi:10.2307/2537235. JSTOR 2537235.

=== News ===
- "Anwar al-Khatib, Palestinian Official, 76". The New York Times. 9 February 1993. Archived from the original on 23 July 2024.
- "Two Banished Jerusalem Arab Leaders Declare Readiness to Cooperate with Israel". Jewish Telegraphic Agency. 2 August 1967. Archived from the original on 4 November 2026.

=== Web ===
- "Anwar al-Khatib al-Tamimi". Jerusalem Story. Archived from the original on 4 November 2026.
