= Izzat Tannous =

Palestinian-American physician and politician (1896–1993)

- Born: 27 July 1896; Nablus, Ottoman Empire
- Died: 6 August 1993 (aged 97); Arlington, VA, USA
- Burial place: Protestant Evangelical Cemetery, Beirut, Lebanon
- Education: American University of Beirut
- Occupation: Physician
- Years active: 1930s–1980s
- Spouse: Lily Daun
- Children: 3

Izzat Tannous (1896–1993) was a Palestinian physician and politician who was the representative of the Palestine Arab Higher Committee and the member of the Arab Higher Committee heading its treasury department. He was among the community leaders of the Arab Anglicans in Palestine. He was one of the figures who tried to block partition of Palestine and a cofounder of the Palestine Liberation Organization (PLO).

== Early life and education ==
Tannous was born in Nablus on 27 July 1896. He hailed from a Christian family. The family had to leave Nablus in 1948 when the State of Israel was formed.

Tannous graduated from the St. George's School in Jerusalem in 1911. He was part of the football team of the school. He had a degree in medicine from the Syrian Arab College in Beirut which is the precursor of the American University of Beirut in 1918.

== Career ==
Following his graduation Tannous worked as a physician in Jerusalem. He joined the Arab Party during the 1930s and served as head of the Arab Information Office in London in 1936. He published a report of the Palestine commission in 1939. He was instrumental in the establishment of the office for the Arab League in London in 1945. He became a representative of the Palestine Arab Higher Committee at the United Nations General Assembly. He was a member of the Arab Higher Committee from 1946 and headed its treasury department, the Palestine National Fund.

Tannous was part of the Palestinians who attempted to block partition of Palestine through negotiations with the British. He founded the Arab Palestine Office in Beirut in 1949 and was the head of the delegation of the Arab Higher Committee to the United Nations in the 1950s. In this capacity he met the Israeli journalist Uri Avnery. Tannous acted as the secretary general of the Representatives of the Palestine Refugee Committees in Lebanon. He founded the Palestine Arab Refugee Office in New York in 1954 and headed the Office.

Tannous was one of the founders of the PLO in 1964 and headed its New York office until 1968.

Tannous published a book entitled The Palestinians: A Detailed Documented Eyewitness History of Palestine Under British Mandate in 1988.

=== Views ===
Tannous was part of the Nakba generation who held a moderate approach and denied the use of violent ways to overcome of the problems of the Palestinians due to their forced leave of Palestine. He was an opponent of the orientalism.

== Personal life and death ==
Tannous was married to Lily Daun with whom he had three children: Raja, Farid and Layla.

Tannous died in Arlington, VA, on 6 August 1993 and was buried at the Protestant Evangelical Cemetery in Beirut, Lebanon.
