= National Bloc (Mandatory Palestine) =

- Founder: Abd al-Latif Salah
- Founded: 1935
- Dissolved: October 1937 (Banned)
- Ideology: Palestinian nationalism Arab nationalism Anti-Zionism

The National Bloc (al-Kutla al-Wataniyya الكتلة الوطنية) was a Nablus-based party established in 1935 in the British Mandate for Palestine by Abd al-Latif Salah, a lawyer and former official in the Ottoman Senate at Istanbul. Salah generally took an anti-Husayni stance.

Its program called for an independent Palestine with an Arab majority and a unification of the political efforts of the Palestinian Arabs. It had limited membership mainly from areas around Nablus and Jaffa. It was one of the parties banned by the British in October 1937.

== Bibliography ==
- Kupferschmidt, Uri M. (1987). The Supreme Muslim Council: Islam Under the British Mandate for Palestine. Brill Academic Publishers. ISBN 90-04-07929-7
