= Mufid Nashashibi =

Palestinian engineer

Mufid Said Ahmad Nashashibi
- مفيد سعيد أحمد النشاشيبي

Co-Founder of the Palestinian National Liberation League
- Incumbent
- Assumed office 1942

Personal details
- Born: 16 July 1915 Jerusalem
- Died: April 1999 (aged 83) California, United States
- Education: St. George's School, Jerusalem, American University in Cairo, Robert College Istanbul
- Profession: Engineer

Mufid Said Ahmad Nashashibi (Arabic: مفيد سعيد أحمد النشاشيبي; 16 July 1915 – April 1999) was one of the founders of the Palestinian National Liberation League, which was established in 1942.

Born in Jerusalem, Nashashibi was educated at St. George's School in Jerusalem, the American University in Cairo and Robert College in Istanbul. In 1936, he returned to Jerusalem to work as an engineer. In 1949, he became the manager of engineering services for the United Nations Relief and Works Agency for Palestinian Refugees. In 1962, he became project manager for the construction of the Kuwait Sewage System. At first, he moved to Lebanon but, in the early 1980s, he moved to California, where he died.
