= National Liberation League in Palestine =

Defunct political party

National Liberation League in Palestine عصبة التحرر الوطني في فلسطين
- Founded: 1943
- Dissolved: 1951
- Split from: Palestine Communist Party
- Merged into: Maki (in Israel); Jordanian Communist Party (in the West Bank)
- Ideology: Communism
- Political position: Far-left

The National Liberation League in Palestine (Arabic: عصبة التحرر الوطني في فلسطين Uṣbat at-Taḥrīr al-Waṭaniyy fi Falasṭīn) was a political party in Palestine, founded in early 1944 by Arab members of the Palestine Communist Party (which had experienced a split between Jewish and Arab members the previous year), Bulus Farah and his followers, and other trade unionists and left wing intellectuals.

== History ==
The founders included Haidar Abdel-Shafi, Mukhlis Amer, Emil Habibi, Mufid Nashashibi and Emile Toma. It published the al-Ittihad newspaper in Haifa, a journal which still exists. It was the only Arab Palestinian party to support the 1947 UN Partition Plan, in line with the official position of the Soviet Union.

In October 1948, after the formation of the State of Israel, the NLL merged with Maki. Since both Arab and Jewish Communists still hoped to establish two states on the terms of the UN Partition Plan, it was decided that the Maki and NLL party organizations would merge in the areas that the UN had laid out for a Jewish state, while the NLL would continue to exist as an independent party in areas of Israel that were to have been part of an Arab state under the UN plan. NLL leaders were added to an expanded Maki Central Committee. In practice, the NLL quickly ceased to exist within Israel except in name, and in April 1949 al-Ittihad and its Hebrew sister paper, Kol HaAm, quietly dropped all references to the NLL. On July 20, 1949, Egypt destroyed the remnant of the NLL existing in Gaza, arresting 33 people. In 1951, its members in the West Bank joined the Jordanian Communist Party.
