= National Defense Party (Mandatory Palestine) =

Political organization in 1930s

- Arabic name: حزب الدفاع الوطني
- Hebrew name: מפלגת ההגנה הלאומית
- Founder: Raghib al-Nashashibi
- Founded: December 1934
- Ideology: Palestinian nationalism Anti-Zionism; Arab–Jewish reconciliation Anti-Husayni
- Political position: Centre

The National Defense Party (NDP; Arabic: حزب الدفاع الوطني Ḥizb al-Difāʿ al-Waṭanī) was founded by Raghib al-Nashashibi in the British Mandate of Palestine in December 1934.

== Overview ==
The party was regarded as more moderate than the Palestine Arab Party. Its program called for an independent Palestine with an Arab majority and rejection of the Balfour Declaration. The party was represented on the first Arab Higher Committee, 26 April 1936, but withdrew in early July 1937. It managed to avoid being banned when all the other Palestinian Arab nationalist parties were suppressed by the authorities beginning in October 1937. The party actively assisted the British during the Arab Revolt and were regarded as collaborators and subject to attacks and assassinations. The second Arab Higher Committee tried to exclude members of the NDP from being included in the Palestinian Arab delegation to the 1939 Round Table Conference. A compromise was reached and Raghib al-Nashashibi and a colleague joined the conference two days after its start. The NDP was the first Palestinian political party to announce that it accepted the 1939 White Paper.
