= Palestinian nationalism =

Movement for self-determination and sovereignty of Palestine

Palestinian nationalism is the national movement of the Palestinian people that espouses self-determination and sovereignty over the region of Palestine. Originally formed in the early 20th century in opposition to Zionism, Palestinian nationalism later internationalized and attached itself to other ideologies; it has thus rejected the occupation of the Palestinian territories by the government of Israel since the 1967 Six-Day War. Palestinian nationalists often draw upon broader political traditions in their ideology, such as Arab socialism and ethnic nationalism in the context of Muslim religious nationalism. Related beliefs have shaped the government of Palestine and continue to do so.

In the broader context of the Arab–Israeli conflict in the 21st century, Palestinian nationalist aims have included an end to the refugee status of individuals separated from their native lands during the 1948 Palestinian expulsion and flight, advocates stating that a "right of return" exists either to the occupied territories or to both those areas plus places within Israel itself. Nationalists have additionally worked to advance specific causes in terms of current residents' lives such as freedom of assembly, labor rights, the right to health care, and the right to travel. Divisions exist between nationalists over particular ideological goals, an example being the gulf between Islamist Palestinians favoring a more authoritarian state compared to centrist and secular Palestinians supporting democratic self-determination. Palestinian nationalists are also divided by preferred tactics; some favor nonviolent resistance while others advocate for and engage in political violence both inside and outside Israel.

Flag of Palestine

== Origins ==
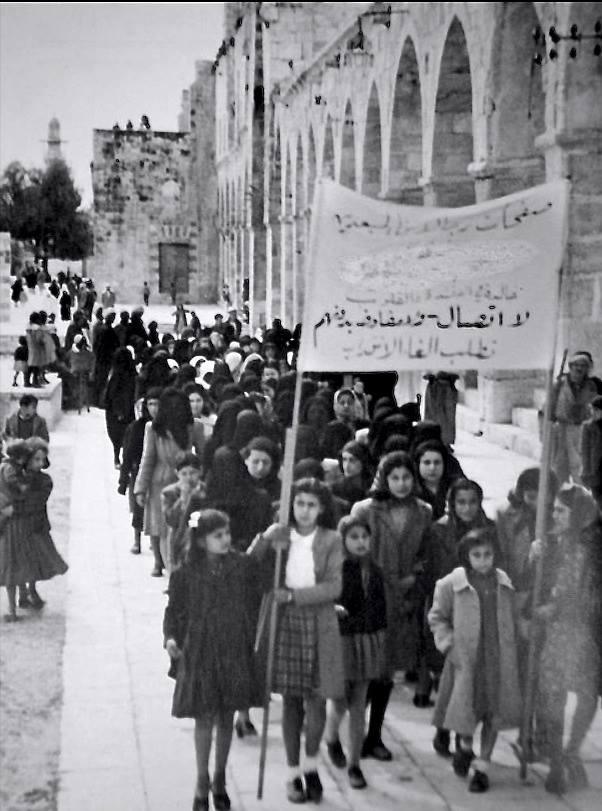
A 1930 protest in Jerusalem against the British Mandate by Palestinian women. The sign reads "No dialogue, no negotiations until termination [of the Mandate]".

Israeli historian Haim Gerber, a professor of Islamic History at Hebrew University of Jerusalem, traces Arab nationalism back to a 17th-century religious leader, Mufti Khayr al-Din al-Ramli (1585–1671) who lived in Ramla. Khayr al-Din al-Ramli's religious edicts (fatwa, plural fatawa), collected into final form in 1670 under the name al-Fatawa al-Khayriyah, mentions the concepts Filastin, biladuna (our country), al-Sham (Syria), Misr (Egypt), and diyar (country), in senses that appear to go beyond objective geography. Gerber describes this as "embryonic territorial awareness, though the reference is to social awareness rather than to a political one". Baruch Kimmerling and Joel Migdal suggest a singular Palestinian identity was first prefigured in the inter-community coalitions which emerged in the region after the 1834 Palestinian Arab revolt against Egyptian conquest and conscription.

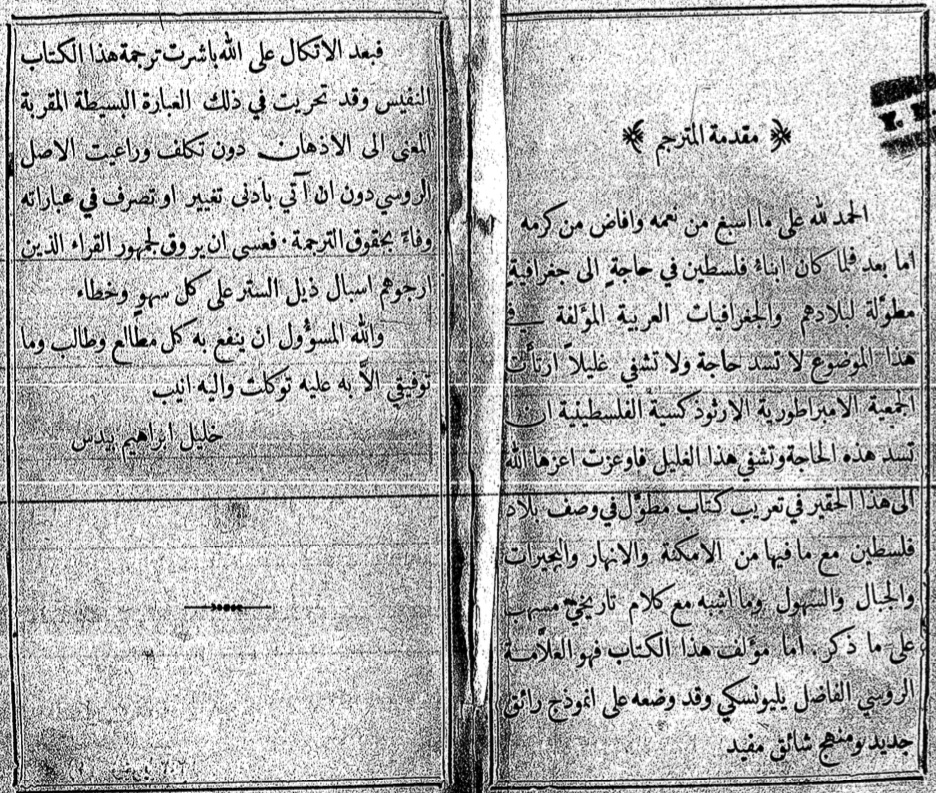
Khalil Beidas's 1898 use of the word "Palestinians" in the preface to his translation of Akim Olesnitsky's A Description of the Holy Land

Zachary J. Foster suggests the first recorded use of the term "Filastini" (lit. 'Palestinian') to describe the region's Arab inhabitants dates to 1898, when Khalil Beidas used it in the preface to a book he translated from Russian to Arabic. (Note: In the book, Akim Olesnitsky's A Description of the Holy Land, Beidas explained that the summer agricultural work in Palestine began in May with the wheat and barley harvest. After enduring the entire summer with no rain at all—leaving the water cisterns depleted and the rivers and springs dry—"the Palestinian peasant waits impatiently for winter to come, for the season's rain to moisten his fossilized fields.") Foster said that the term "Palestinian" had already been used decades earlier in Western languages by the 1846–1863 British Consul in Jerusalem, James Finn; the German Lutheran missionary Johann Ludwig Schneller (1820–1896), founder of the Syrian Orphanage; and the American James Wells. Baidas' own education about the term "Palestine" can be traced to the Russian Seminary in Nazareth, where such texts were taught in Arabic translation. Russia's Arabic-language school system is said to have been influential in spurring the Nahda (Arab Enlightenment) throughout Palestine in the late nineteenth century.

Foster also records early usage of the term by Farid Georges Kassab, "a Beirut-based Orthodox Christian" in 1909. Kassab refers to the Arabic-speaking locals as Palestinians throughout his book, Palestine, Hellenism, and Clericalism, but also says that "the Orthodox Palestinian Ottomans call themselves Arabs". From 1911, the Palestinian Arab Christian newspaper Falastin also addressed its readers as Palestinians.

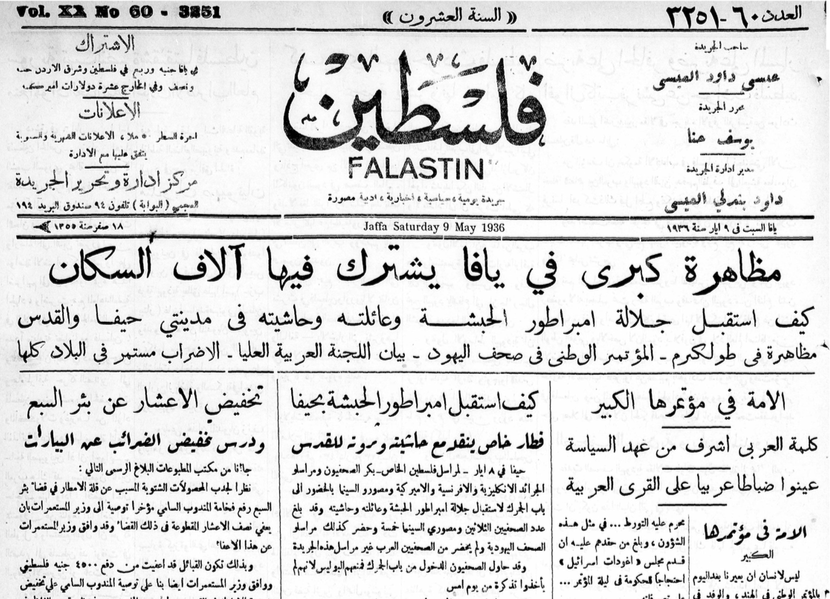
1936 issue of the Palestinian Arab Christian Falastin newspaper addressed its readers as "Palestinians" since its establishment in 1911.

In his 1997 book, Palestinian Identity: The Construction of Modern National Consciousness, historian Rashid Khalidi says that Palestinian identity has never been an exclusive one, with "Arabism, religion, and local loyalties" playing an important role. Khalidi describes the Arab population of British Mandatory Palestine as having "overlapping identities", with some or many expressing loyalties to villages, regions, a projected nation of Palestine, an alternative of inclusion in a Greater Syria, an Arab national project, as well as to Islam; and that this had not yet evolved into "nation-state nationalism". He says that modern-day Palestinian identity is informed by the history of Palestine—encompassing the Biblical, Roman, Byzantine, Umayyad, Fatimid, Crusader, Ayyubid, Mamluk and Ottoman periods—as Palestinians have come to understand it over the last century, but says that Palestinian nationalist consciousness is in fact "relatively modern". Khalidi suggests the modern national identity of Palestinians has its roots in nationalist discourses that emerged among the peoples of the Ottoman Empire in the late 19th century, which sharpened following the demarcation of modern nation-state boundaries in the Middle East after World War I. James L. Gelvin suggests the emergence of Palestinian nationalism during the interwar period was a "response to Zionist immigration and settlement". He says this does not make Palestinian identity any less legitimate "or make it less valid than Zionism", since "all nationalisms are defined by what they oppose". Khalidi also says that Zionism played a role in shaping the Palestinian identity, but says "it is a serious mistake to suggest that Palestinian identity emerged mainly as a response to Zionism".

Bernard Lewis says Arab nationalism in the Ottoman Empire "had not reached significant proportions before the outbreak of World War I", and therefore Palestinians could not oppose Zionism based on Palestinian nationalism, since it did not yet exist. Benny Morris suggests that the Arabs in Palestine remained part of a larger Pan-Islamist or Pan-Arab national movement until 1920. Morris says the emergence of the Palestinian national identity can be traced through the successive postwar Palestine Arab Congresses: in January 1919, the First Congress saw "Palestine as part of Arab Syria"; in December 1920, the Third Congress called upon the British to establish a "native government", making no further mention of "Southern Syria". Daniel Pipes suggests that, as a result of the carving of the British Mandate of Palestine out of Greater Syria, the Arabs of the new Mandate were forced to make the best they could of their situation, with a distinctly "Palestinian Arab" identity emerging by the end of 1920.

== Late Ottoman context ==
The collapse of the Ottoman Empire was accompanied by an increasing sense of Arab identity in the Empire's Arab provinces, most notably Syria, considered to include both northern Palestine and Lebanon. This development is often seen as connected to the wider reformist trend known as al-Nahda ("awakening", sometimes called "the Arab renaissance"), which in the late 19th century brought about a redefinition of Arab cultural and political identities with the unifying feature of Arabic.

Under the Ottomans, Palestine's Arab population mostly saw themselves as Ottoman subjects. In the 1830s however, Palestine was occupied by the Egyptian vassal of the Ottomans, Muhammad Ali and his son Ibrahim Pasha. The Palestinian Arab revolt was precipitated by popular resistance against heavy demands for conscripts, as peasants were well aware that conscription was little more than a death sentence. Starting in May 1834 the rebels took many cities, among them Jerusalem, Hebron and Nablus. In response, Ibrahim Pasha sent in an army, finally defeating the last rebels on 4 August in Hebron.

The flag of the Arab Revolt against the Ottoman Empire is a prominent symbol of Arab nationalism. Its design and colors are the basis of many of the Arab states' flags.

While Arab nationalism, at least in an early form, and Syrian nationalism were the dominant tendencies along with continuing loyalty to the Ottoman state, Palestinian politics were marked by a reaction to foreign predominance and the growth of foreign immigration, particularly Zionist.

The Egyptian occupation of Palestine in the 1830s resulted in the destruction of Acre and thus, the political importance of Nablus increased. The Ottomans wrested back control of Palestine from the Egyptians in 1840–41. As a result, the Abd al-Hadi clan, who originated in Arrabah in the Sahl Arraba region in northern Samaria, rose to prominence. Loyal allies of Jezzar Pasha and the Tuqans, they gained the governorship of Jabal Nablus and other sanjaqs.

In 1887 the Mutassariflik (Mutasarrifate) of Jerusalem was constituted as part of an Ottoman government policy dividing the vilayet of Greater Syria into smaller administrative units. The administration of the mutasarrifate took on a distinctly local appearance.

Michelle Compos records that "Later, after the founding of Tel Aviv in 1909, conflicts over land grew in the direction of explicit national rivalry." Zionist ambitions were increasingly identified as a threat by Palestinian leaders, while cases of purchase of lands by Zionist settlers and the subsequent eviction of Palestinian peasants aggravated the issue.

The programmes of four Palestinian nationalist societies jamyyat al-Ikha’ wal-‘Afaf (Brotherhood and Purity), al-jam’iyya al-Khayriyya al-Islamiyya (Islamic Charitable Society), Shirkat al-Iqtissad al-Falastini al-Arabi (lit. 'Arab Palestinian Economic Association') and Shirkat al-Tijara al-Wataniyya al-Iqtisadiyya (lit. 'National Economic Trade Association') were reported in the newspaper Filastin in June 1914 by letter from R. Abu al-Sal’ud. The four societies has similarities in function and ideals; the promotion of patriotism, educational aspirations and support for national industries.

== Nationalist groups built around notables ==
Palestinian Arab A’ayan ("Notables") were a group of urban elites at the apex of the Palestinian socio-economic pyramid where the combination of economic and political power dominated Palestinian Arab politics throughout the British Mandate period. The dominance of the A’ayan had been encouraged and utilised during the Ottoman period and later, by the British during the Mandate period, to act as intermediaries between the authority and the people to administer the local affairs of Palestine.

=== Al-Husseini ===
The al-Husayni family were a major force in rebelling against Muhammad Ali who governed Egypt and Palestine in defiance of the Ottoman Empire. This solidified a cooperative relationship with the returning Ottoman authority. The family took part in fighting the Qaisi family in an alliance with a rural lord of the Jerusalem area Mustafa Abu Ghosh, who clashed with the tribe frequently. The feuds gradually occurred in the city between the clan and the Khalidis that led the Qaisis however these conflicts dealt with city positions and not Qaisi-Yamani rivalry.

The Husaynis later led resistance and propaganda movements against the Young Turks who controlled the Ottoman Empire and more so against the British Mandate government and early Zionist immigration. Jamal al-Husayni was the founder and chairman of the Palestine Arab Party (PAP) in 1935. Emil Ghoury was elected as General Secretary, a post he held until the end of the British Mandate in 1948. In 1948, after Jordan had occupied Jerusalem, King Abdullah of Jordan removed Hajj Amīn al-Husayni from the post of Grand Mufti of Jerusalem and banned him from entering Jerusalem.

=== Nashashibi ===
The Nashashibi family had particularly strong influence in Palestine during the British Mandate Period from 1920 until 1948. Throughout this period, they competed with the Husaynis, for dominance of the Palestinian Arab political scene. As with other A’ayan their lack of identification with the Palestinian Arab population allowed them to rise as leaders but not as representatives of the Palestinian Arab community. The Nashashibi family was led by Raghib Nashashibi, who was appointed as Mayor of Jerusalem in 1920. Raghib was an influential political figure throughout the British Mandate period, and helped form the National Defence Party in 1934. He also served as a minister in the Jordanian government, governor of the West Bank, member of the Jordanian Senate, and the first military governor in Palestine.

=== Tuqan ===
The Tuqan family, originally from northern Syria, was led by Hajj Salih Pasha Tuqan in the early eighteenth century and were the competitors of the Nimr family in the Jabal Nablus (the sub-district of Nablus and Jenin). Members of the Tuqan family held the post of mutasallim (sub-district governor) longer than did any other family in the eighteenth and nineteenth centuries.The rivalry between the Tuqans and Nimr family continued until the 1820s.

=== Abd al-Hadi ===
Awni Abd al-Hadi of the ‘Abd al Hadi family. The Abd al-Hadis were a leading landowning family in the Palestinian districts of Afula, Baysan, Jenin, and Nablus. Awni established the Hizb al-Istiqlal (Independence Party) as a branch of the pan-Arab party. Rushdi Abd al-Hadi joined the British administrative service in 1921. Amin Abd al-Hadi joined the SMC in 1929, and Tahsin Abd al-Hadi was mayor of Jenin. Some family members secretly sold their shares of Zirʿin village to the Jewish National Fund in July 1930 despite nationalist opposition to such land sales. Tarab ‘Abd al Hadi feminist and activist was the wife of Awni ‘Abd al Hadi, Abd al-Hadi Palace built by Mahmud ‘Abd al Hadi in Nablus stands testament to the power and prestige of the family.

=== Khalidiy, al-Dajjani, al-Shanti ===
Other A’ayan were the Khalidi family, al-Dajjani family, and the al-Shanti family. The views of the A’ayan and their allies largely shaped the divergent political stances of Palestinian Arabs at the time. In 1918, as the Palestinian Arab national movements gained strength in Jerusalem, Jaffa, Haifa, Acre and Nablus, Aref al-Aref joined Hajj Amīn, his brother Fakhri Al Husseini, Ishaaq Darweesh, Ibrahim Darweesh, Jamal al-Husayni, Kamel Al Budeiri, and Sheikh Hassan Abu Al-So’oud in establishing the Arab Club.

== British Mandate period ==
=== 1918–1920 nationalist activity ===
Following the arrival of the British a number of Muslim-Christian Associations were established in all the major towns. In 1919 they joined to hold the first Palestine Arab Congress in Jerusalem. Its main platforms were a call for representative government and opposition to the Balfour Declaration.

The Faisal-Weizmann Agreement led the Palestinian Arab population to reject the Syrian-Arab-Nationalist movement led by Faisal (in which many previously placed their hopes) and instead to agitate for Palestine to become a separate state, with an Arab majority. To further that objective, they demanded an elected assembly. In 1919, in response to Palestinian Arab fears of the inclusion of the Balfour declaration to process the secret society al-Kaff al-Sawada’ (the Black-hand, its name soon changed to al-Fida’iyya, The Self-Sacrificers) was founded, it later played an important role in clandestine anti-British and anti-Zionist activities. The society was run by the al-Dajjani and al-Shanti families, with Ibrahim Hammani in charge of training; ‘Isa al-Sifri developed a secret code for correspondence. The society was initially based in Jaffa but moved its headquarters to Nablus, the Jerusalem branch was run by Mahmud Aziz al-Khalidi.

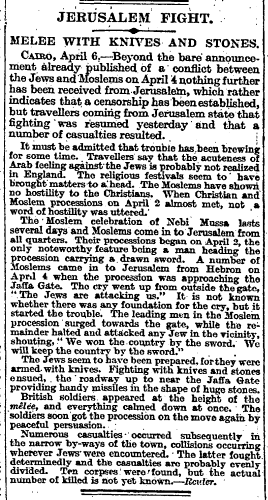
The Times report of the riots, 8 April 1920

After the April riots an event took place that turned the traditional rivalry between the Husayni and Nashashibi clans into a serious rift, with long-term consequences for al-Husayni and Palestinian nationalism. According to Sir Louis Bols, great pressure was brought to bear on the military administration from Zionist leaders and officials such as David Yellin, to have the Mayor of Jerusalem, Mousa Kazzim al-Husayni, dismissed, given his presence in the Nabi Musa riots of the previous March. Colonel Storrs, the Military Governor of Jerusalem, removed him without further inquiry, replacing him with Raghib. This, according to the Palin report, 'had a profound effect on his co-religionists, definitely confirming the conviction they had already formed from other evidence that the Civil Administration was the mere puppet of the Zionist Organization.'

=== Supreme Muslim Council under Hajj Amin (1921–1937) ===
The High Commissioner of Palestine, Herbert Samuel, as a counterbalance the Nashashibis gaining the position of Mayor of Jerusalem, pardoned Hajj Amīn and Aref al-Aref and established a Supreme Muslim Council (SMC), or Supreme Muslim Sharia Council, on 20 December 1921. The SMC was to have authority over all the Muslim Waqfs (religious endowments) and Sharia (religious law) Courts in Palestine. The members of the council were to be elected by an electoral college and appointed Hajj Amīn as president of the council with the powers of employment over all Muslim officials throughout Palestine. The Anglo American committee termed it a powerful political machine.

The Hajj Amin rarely delegated authority, consequently most of the council's executive work was carried out by Hajj Amīn. Nepotism and favoritism played a central part to Hajj Amīn's tenure as president of the SMC, Amīn al-Tamīmī was appointed as acting president when the Hajj Amīn was abroad, The secretaries appointed were ‘Abdallah Shafĩq and Muhammad al’Afĩfĩ and from 1928 to 1930 the secretary was Hajj Amīn's relative Jamāl al-Husaynī, Sa’d al Dīn al-Khaţīb and later another of the Hajj Amīn's relatives ‘Alī al-Husaynī and ‘Ajaj Nuwayhid, a Druze was an adviser.

==== Politicisation of the Wailing Wall ====
It was during the British mandate period that politicisation of the Wailing Wall occurred. The disturbances at the Wailing wall in 1928 were repeated in 1929. However, the violence in the riots that followed, that left 116 Palestinian Arabs, 133 Jews dead and 339 wounded, were surprising in their intensity.

==== Black Hand gang ====
Izz ad-Din al-Qassam established the Black Hand gang in 1935. Izz ad-Din died in a shootout against the British forces. He has been popularised in Palestinian nationalist folklore for his fight against Zionism.

=== 1936–1939 Arab revolt ===
The Great revolt of 1936–1939 was an uprising by Palestinian Arabs in the British Mandate of Palestine in protest against mass Jewish immigration.

Abd al-Qadir al-Husayni, a leader of the revolt, was a member of the Palestine Arab Party who had served as its Secretary-General and had become editor-in-chief of the party's paper Al-Liwa’ as well as of other newspapers, including Al-Jami’a Al-Islamiyya. In 1938, Abd al-Qadir was exiled and in 1939 fled to Iraq where he took part in the Rashid Ali al-Gaylani coup.

Muhammad Nimr al-Hawari, who had started his career as a devoted follower of Hajj Amin, broke with the influential Husayni family in the early 1940s. The British estimated the strength of the al-Najjada paramilitary scout movement, led by Al-Hawari, at 8,000 prior to 1947.

==== 1937 Peel Report and its aftermath ====
The Nashashibi clan broke with the Arab High Committee and Hajj Amīn shortly after the contents of the Palestine Royal Commission report compiled by the Peel Commission were released on 7 July 1937, announcing a territorial partition plan. The Nashashibis, the Arab Palestinian Communist Party, and many other Palestinians accepted the plan, but the split in the ranks between rejectionists and pro-partitionists led to Hajj Amin taking control of the Arab High Committee. He, with the support of the Arab League, rejected the plan.

==== Results ====
The revolt of 1936–1939 led to an imbalance of power between the Jewish community and the Palestinian Arab community, as the latter had been substantially disarmed. The British also greatly reduced Zionist immigration to appease the Arab Middle East with a confrontation with Nazi Germany looming. A further offer was made to the Palestinians in the British "White Paper of 1939", which proposed a ceiling of 75,000 on Jewish migration into Palestine over the next five years, after which Arab agreement would be required. It additionally proposed severely limiting Jewish land purchases, and offered an Arab-majority Palestinian state within ten years. This offer was rejected by the Arab Higher Committee.

== 1947–1948 war ==
Al-Qadir moved to Egypt in 1946, but secretly returned to Palestine to lead the Army of the Holy War (AHW) in January 1948, and was killed during hand-to-hand fighting against Haganah; where AHW captured Qastal Hill on the Tel Aviv–Jerusalem road, on 8 April 1948. al-Qadir's death was a factor in the loss of morale among his forces, Ghuri, who had no experience of military command was appointed as commander of the AHW. Fawzi al-Qawuqji, at the head of the Arab Liberation Army remained as the only prominent military commander.

== 1948–1964 ==
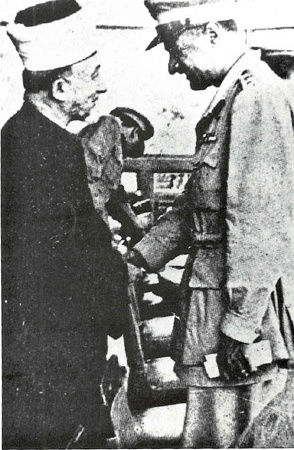
Haj Amin al-Husseini meeting with Gamal Abdel Nasser, the future Egyptian president, in 1948

In September 1948, the All-Palestine Government was proclaimed in Egyptian-controlled Gaza Strip, and immediately won the support of Arab League members except Jordan. Though jurisdiction of the Government was declared to cover the whole of the former Mandatory Palestine, its effective jurisdiction was limited to the Gaza Strip. The Prime Minister of the Gaza-seated administration was named Ahmed Hilmi Pasha, and the President was named Hajj Amin al-Husseini, former chairman of the Arab Higher Committee.

The All-Palestine Government however lacked any significant authority and was in fact seated in Cairo. In 1959 it was officially merged into the United Arab Republic by the decree of Nasser, crippling any Palestinian hope for self governance. With the establishment in 1948 of the State of Israel, along with the 1948 Palestinian exodus, the common experience of the Palestinian refugee Arabs was mirrored in a fading of Palestinian identity. The institutions of a Palestinian nationality emerged slowly among Palestinian refugees in the diaspora. In 1950 Yasser Arafat founded Ittihad Talabat Filastin. After the 1948 Arab–Israeli War, most of the Husseini clan relocated to Jordan and the Gulf States. Many family heads that remained in the Old City and the northern neighborhoods of East Jerusalem fled due to hostility with the Jordanian government, which controlled that part of the city.

The Fatah movement, which espoused a Palestinian nationalist ideology in which Palestinians would be liberated by the actions of Palestinian Arabs, was founded in 1954 by members of the Palestinian diaspora—principally professionals working in the Gulf States who had been refugees in Gaza and had gone on to study in Cairo or Beirut—including Yasser Arafat who was head of the General Union of Palestinian Students (GUPS) (1952–1956) in Cairo University, Salah Khalaf, Khalil al-Wazir, Khaled Yashruti was head of the GUPS in Beirut (1958–1962).

== PLO until the First Intifada (1964–1988) ==
The Palestine Liberation Organisation was founded by a meeting of 422 Palestinian national figures in Jerusalem in May 1964, following an earlier decision of the Arab League. Issued on 28 May, the PLO's founding charter sought a one-state solution within the boundaries of Mandatory Palestine, with a right of return and self-determination for Palestinians. The charter also called for the dissolution of Israel and the expulsion of all Jews that had arrived after the Balfour Declaration, with any remaining Jews considered part of a single democratic state. The charter also sought to "prohibit... the existence and activity" of Zionism.

Following the defeat of the Arab states in the June 1967 Six-Day War, the West Bank, East Jerusalem and the Gaza Strip came under Israeli military control and occupation. Following the Battle of Karameh in May 1968, which Yasser Arafat claimed as a victory (in Arabic, "karameh" means "dignity"), Arafat quickly became a Palestinian national hero. Masses of young Arabs joined the ranks of his group Fatah. Under pressure, Ahmad Shukeiri resigned from the PLO leadership and in July 1969, Fatah joined and soon controlled the PLO. The fierce Palestinian guerrilla fighting and the Jordanian Artillery bombardment forced the IDF withdrawal and gave the Palestinian Arabs an important morale boost. Israel was calling their army the indomitable army but this was the first chance for Arabs to claim victory after defeat in 1948, 1953, and 1967. After the battle, Fatah began to engage in communal projects to achieve popular affiliation. After the Battle of Karameh there was a subsequent increase in the PLO's strength.

In 1974 the PLO called for an independent state in the territory of Mandate Palestine. The group used guerilla tactics to attack Israel from their bases in Jordan, Lebanon, and Syria, as well as from within the Gaza Strip and West Bank.

In 1988, the PLO officially endorsed a two-state solution, with Israel and Palestine living side-by-side contingent on specific terms such as making East Jerusalem capital of the Palestinian state and giving Palestinians the right of return to land occupied by Palestinians prior to the 1948 and 1967 wars with Israel. Some scholars, journalists and politicians doubted the honesty in these declarations, and viewed the ambiguity in them as prevarications directed to a Western audience.

== First Intifada (1987–1993) ==
=== Local leadership ===
The First Intifada (1987–1993) would prove another watershed in Palestinian nationalism, as it brought the Palestinians of the West Bank and Gaza to the forefront of the struggle. The Unified National Leadership of the Uprising (UNLU; Arabic al-Qiyada al Muwhhada) mobilised grassroots support for the uprising.

In 1987, the Intifada caught the PLO by surprise; the leadership abroad could only indirectly influence the events. A new local leadership, the UNLU, emerged, consisting of many leading Palestinian factions. The initially spontaneous disturbances soon came under local leadership from groups and organizations loyal to the PLO that operated within the Occupied Territories: Fatah, the Popular Front for the Liberation of Palestine, the Democratic Front for the Liberation of Palestine and the Palestine Communist Party. The UNLU was the focus of the social cohesion that sustained the persistent disturbances.

After King Hussein of Jordan proclaimed the administrative and legal separation of the West Bank from Jordan in 1988, the UNLU organised to fill the political vacuum.

=== Emergence of Hamas ===
In 1987, Palestinian Islamic scholar Ahmed Yassin founded the Islamic Resistance Movement, also known as Hamas, after the outbreak of the First Intifada against the Israeli occupation. It emerged as a distinct Sunni Islamist organisation from his 1973 Mujama al-Islamiya Islamic charity affiliated with the Muslim Brotherhood. According to their founding documents, including their first communique in 1987, and their 1988 charter, Hamas was borth with the goals of waging holy war against Zionism, opposing the peace process, and increase religiosity amongst the youth. The organization advocated for "martyrdom" as the ideal objective in their struggle against Israel. During the intifada, Hamas ended the PLO's monopoly as sole political representative of the Palestinian people.

=== Peace process ===
Some Israelis had become tired of the constant violence of the First Intifada, and many were willing to take risks for peace. Some wanted to realize the economic benefits in the new global economy. The Gulf War (1990–1991) did much to persuade Israelis that the defensive value of territory had been overstated, and that the Iraqi invasion of Kuwait psychologically reduced their sense of security.

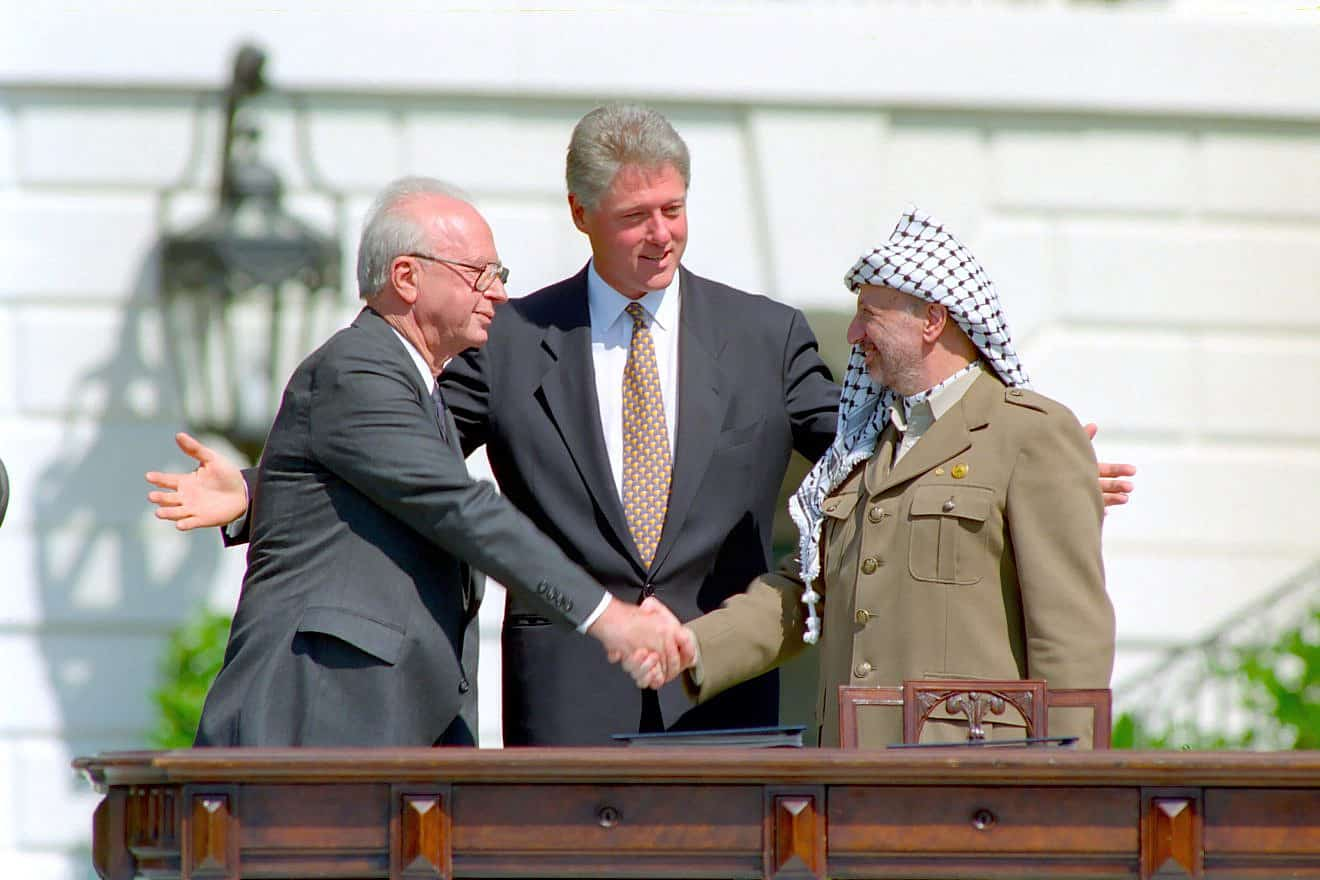
Yitzhak Rabin, Yasser Arafat and Bill Clinton at the signing of the Oslo Accords, 13 September 1993

A renewal of the Israeli–Palestinian quest for peace began at the end of the Cold War as the United States took the lead in international affairs. After the collapse of the Soviet Union, Western observers were optimistic, as Francis Fukuyama wrote in an article, titled "The End of History". The hope was that the end of the Cold War heralded the beginning of a new international order. President George H. W. Bush, in a speech on 11 September 1990, spoke of a "rare opportunity" to move toward a "New world order" in which "the nations of the world, east and west, north and south, can prosper and live in harmony," adding that "today the new world is struggling to be born".

==== 1993 Oslo Agreement ====
Signing of the accords

The demands of the local Palestinian and Israeli populations somewhat differed from those of the Palestinian diaspora, which had constituted the main base of the PLO until then, in that they were primarily interested in independence, rather than the right of return for refugees. The resulting 1993 Oslo Agreement cemented the belief in a two-state solution in the mainstream Palestinian movement, as opposed to the PLO's original goal, a one-state solution which entailed the destruction of Israel and its replacement with a secular, democratic Palestinian state.

The two-state solution had first been seriously discussed in the 1970s, when Said Hammami said the PLO would be willing to accept a two-state solution, on at least an interim basis. By 1982, the PLO had officially committed to recognising a two-state solution based on a Palestinian state in the West Bank, Gaza, and East Jerusalem. By the mid-1980s, the two-state solution became the negotiating position of the PLO leadership, with leader Yasser Arafat and King Hussein of Jordan attempting to persuade the United States of the Palestinians' right to self-determination in return for acceptance of United Nations Security Council Resolution 242, and therefore implicit acceptance of Israel's existence. In 1988, the Palestine National Council (PNC) published the first official Palestinian statement recognising a two-state solution, which called only for withdrawal from East Jerusalem and the occupied Palestinian territories. Together with Arafat's later statements in Geneva, this was accepted by the United States as a basis for dialogue.

== Palestinian National Authority (1993) ==
In 1993 with the transfer of increased control of Muslim holy sites in Jerusalem from Israel to the Palestinians, PLO chairman Yasser Arafat appointed Sulaiman Ja'abari as Grand Mufti. When he died in 1994, Arafat appointed Ekrima Sa'id Sabri. Sabri was removed in 2006 by Palestinian National Authority president Mahmoud Abbas, who was concerned that Sabri was involved too heavily in political matters. Abbas appointed Muhammad Ahmad Hussein, who was perceived as a political moderate.

== Goals ==
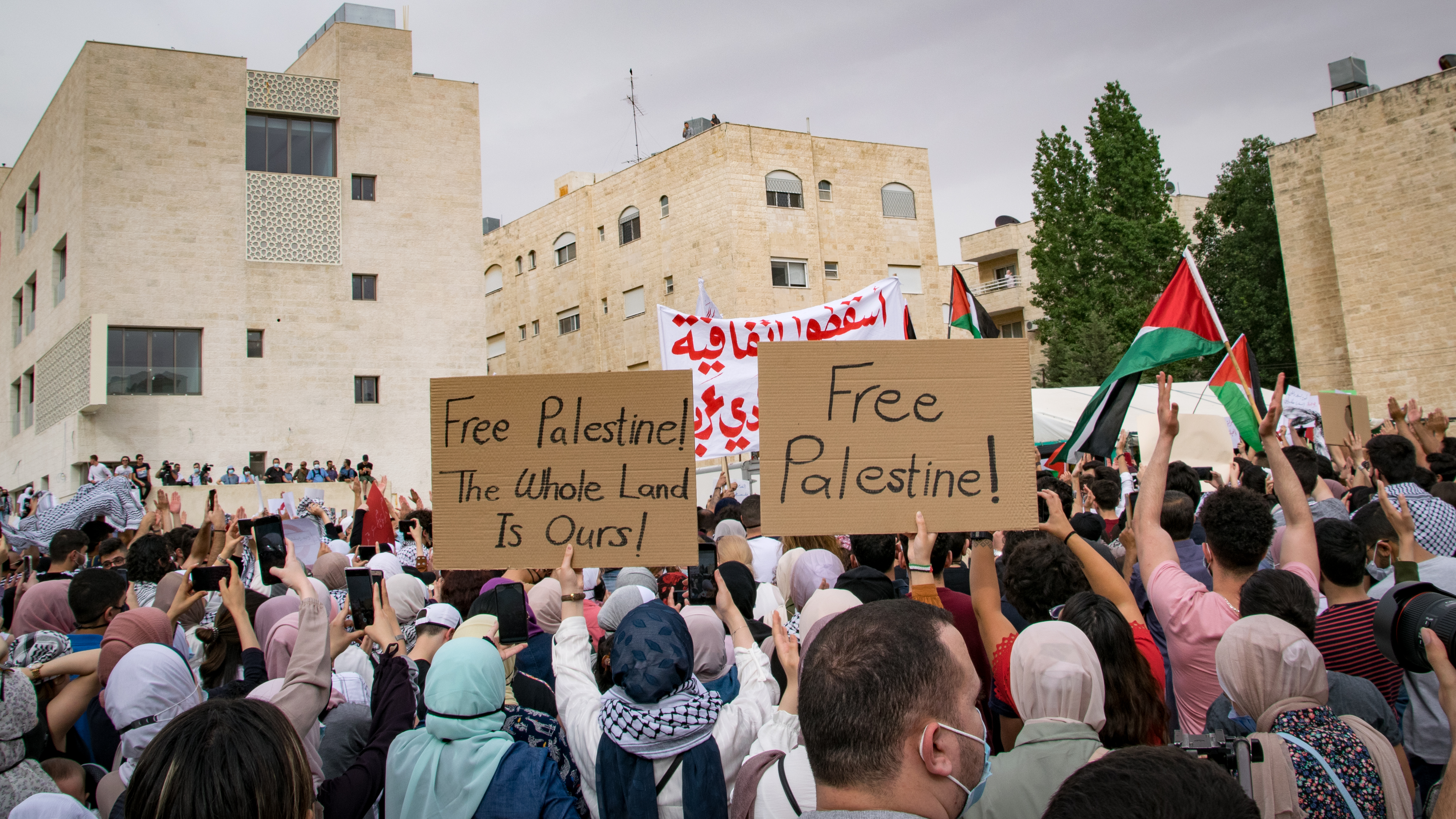
Demonstration in Amman, Jordan, during the 2021 Israel–Palestine crisis

=== Palestinian statehood ===
Contemporary proposals for a Palestinian state include establishment of an independent state for the Palestinian people in Palestine on land that was occupied by Israel since the Six-Day War of 1967 and prior to that year by Egypt (Gaza) and by Jordan (West Bank and East Jerusalem). The proposals include the Gaza Strip, which is controlled by the Hamas faction of the Palestinian National Authority; the West Bank, which is administered by the Fatah faction of the Palestinian National Authority; and East Jerusalem, which was unilaterally annexed by Israel in 1980 and remains under Israeli control. A minority of Palestinians and Israelis support a one-state solution instead throughout the region of British Mandatory Palestine, which would include all of Gaza, the West Bank, and Israel. (Note: According to the most recent joint survey of the Palestinian–Israeli Pulse in 2023, support for a democratic one-state solution stands at 23% among Palestinians and 20% among Israeli Jews. A non-equal non-democratic one-state solution remains more popular among both populations, supported by 30% of Palestinians and 37% of Israeli Jews. A Palestinian poll in September 2024 revealed that only 10% of respondents supported a single state that would provide equal rights for both Israelis and Palestinians.)

=== From the river to the sea ===
"From the river to the sea" is, and forms part of, a popular Palestinian political slogan. It references the land which lies between the Jordan River and the Mediterranean Sea and has been frequently used in statements by Arab leaders. It is also chanted at pro-Palestinian protests and demonstrations, where it is often followed or preceded by the phrase "Palestine will be free".

From its establishment in 1964 until the 1980s, the PLO claimed "Palestine from the river to the sea" as its territory. In a slightly different fashion, "Palestine from the river to the sea" is still claimed by Hamas, referring to all areas of former Mandatory Palestine.

== Other nationalisms ==
=== Pan-Arabism ===
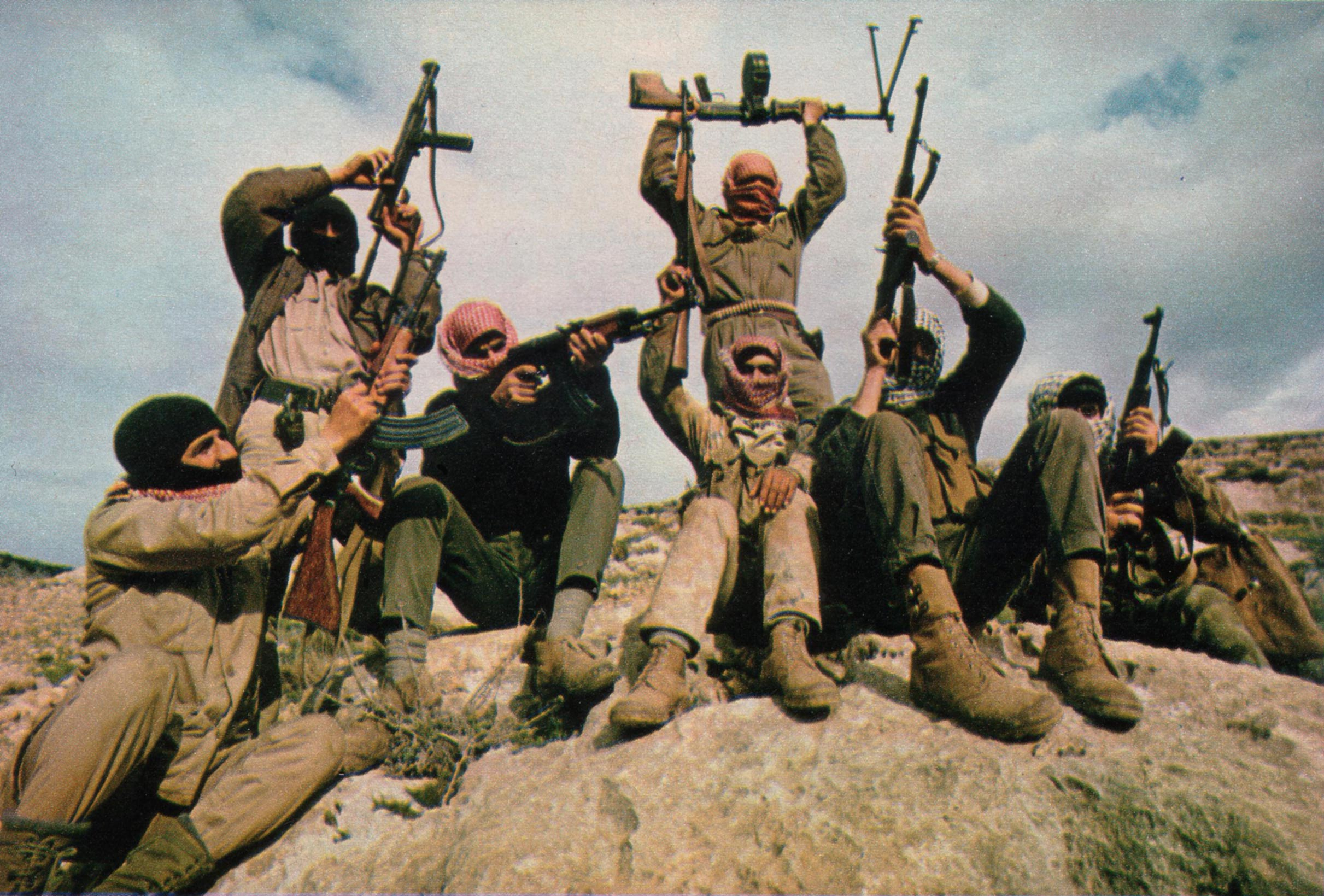
A PFLP patrol in Jordan, 1969

Some groups within the PLO hold a more pan-Arabist view than Fatah, and Fatah itself has never renounced Arab nationalism in favour of a strictly Palestinian nationalist ideology. Some of the pan-Arabist members justifying their views by claiming that the Palestinian struggle must be the spearhead of a wider, pan-Arab movement. For example, the Marxist PFLP viewed the "Palestinian revolution" as the first step to Arab unity as well as inseparable from a global anti-imperialist struggle. This said, however, there seems to be a general consensus among the main Palestinian factions that national liberation takes precedence over other loyalties, including Pan-Arabism, Islamism and proletarian internationalism.

=== Pan-Islamism ===
The Hamas flag.

In a later repetition of these developments, the pan-Islamic sentiments embodied by the Muslim Brotherhood and other religious movements, would similarly provoke conflict with Palestinian nationalism. About 90% of Palestinians are Sunni Muslims, and while never absent from the rhetoric and thinking of the secularist PLO factions, Islamic political doctrines, or Islamism, did not become a large part of the Palestinian movement until the 1980s rise of Hamas.

By early Islamic thinkers, nationalism had been viewed as an ungodly ideology, substituting "the nation" for God as an object of worship and reverence. The struggle for Palestine was viewed exclusively through a religious prism, as a struggle to retrieve Muslim land and the holy places of Jerusalem. However, later developments, not least as a result of Muslim sympathy with the Palestinian struggle led to many Islamic movements accepting nationalism as a legitimate ideology. In the case of Hamas, the Palestinian offshoot of the Muslim Brotherhood.

== See also ==
- Concepts and events:
  - The Global Campaign to Return to Palestine
  - History of Palestine
  - History of Palestinian nationality
  - Israeli–Palestinian conflict
  - Palestinian Declaration of Independence
  - Timeline of the name "Palestine"
  - List of national symbols of Palestine
- Individuals:
  - Abd al-Qadir al-Husayni (1907–1948), military leader
  - Izz ad-Din al-Qassam (1881–1935), Muslim religious and guerilla leader
  - Khalil al-Sakakini (1878–1953), Christian teacher, scholar, poet, and Arab nationalist
  - Musa al-Husayni (1853–1934), mayor of Jerusalem
  - Yousef al-Khalidi (1829–1906), Ottoman politician and mayor of Jerusalem
  - Zuheir Mohsen (1936–1979), pro-Syria PLO leader

== Bibliography ==
- Antonius, George (1938) The Arab Awakening: The Story of the Arab National Movement. Hamish Hamilton. (1945 edition)
- Benvenisti, Meron (1998) City of Stone: The Hidden History of Jerusalem, University of California Press, ISBN 0-520-20768-8
- Cypel, Sylvain (2006) Walled: Israeli Society at an Impasse, Other Press, ISBN 1-59051-210-3
- Franji, Abdullah (1983) The PLO and Palestine, Zed Books, ISBN 0-86232-195-6
- Gresh, Alain (1985). The PLO: The Struggle Within: Towards an Independent Palestinian State. The University of Michigan. ISBN 9780862322724.
- Hamas (1988). "Hamas Covenant 1988: The Covenant of the Islamic Resistance Movement". Yale Law School.
- Hoveyda, Fereydoun of National Committee on American Foreign Policy (2002) The Broken Crescent: The "Threat" of Militant Islamic Fundamentalism, Greenwood Publishing Group, ISBN 0-275-97902-4
- Khalaf, Issa (1991) Politics in Palestine: Arab Factionalism and Social Disintegration, 1939–1948, SUNY Press ISBN 0-7914-0707-1
- Khalidi, Rashid (1997) Palestinian Identity: The Construction of Modern National Consciousness, Columbia University Press, ISBN 0-231-10515-0
- Karsh, Efraim (2013). "Zionism and the Palestinians". In Karsh, Efraim (ed.). Israel at Sixty: Rethinking the birth of the Jewish state. Taylor and Francis. pp. 30–48. ISBN 9781317967767.
- Kimmerling, Baruch and Migdal, Joel S, (2003) The Palestinian People: A History, Cambridge, Harvard University Press, ISBN 0-674-01131-7
- Kupferschmidt, Uri M. (1987) The Supreme Muslim Council: Islam Under the British Mandate for Palestine ISBN 90-04-07929-7
- Kurz, Anat N. (2006-01-30). Fatah and the Politics of Violence: The Institutionalization of a Popular Struggle. Sussex Academic Press. p. 228. ISBN 1-84519-032-7
- Lassner, Jacob (2000) The Middle East Remembered: Forged Identities, Competing Narratives, Contested Spaces, University of Michigan Press, ISBN 0-472-11083-7
- Levenberg, Haim (1993). Military Preparations of the Arab Community in Palestine: 1945–1948. London: Routledge. ISBN 0-7146-3439-5
- Mishal, Shaul and Sela, Avraham (2000) The Palestinian Hamas: Vision, Violence, and Coexistence, Columbia University Press, ISBN 0-231-11675-6
- Morris, Benny (2008) 1948: A History of the First Arab–Israeli War. Yale University Press ISBN 978-0-300-12696-9
- Morris, Benny, (second edition 2004 third printing 2006) The Birth of the Palestinian Refugee Problem Revisited, Cambridge University Press, ISBN 0-521-00967-7*Morris, Benny (2013). One State, Two States: Resolving the Israel/Palestine Conflict. Yale University Press. ISBN 9780300164442.
- Morris, Benny (2001) Righteous Victims: A History of the Zionist-Arab Conflict, 1881-2001. Vintage ISBN 978-0-679-74475-7
- Paz, Reuven (2017). "Hamas Suicide Attacks: Sublime Islamic Goal or Merely another Weapon?". In Hatina, Meir; Litvak, Meir (eds.). Martyrdom and sacrifice in Islam: theological, political and social contexts. London: I. B. Tauris. ISBN 9781784535087.
- Peel Commission (1937). Palestine Royal Commission Report. His Majesty's Stationery Office.
- PLO (1968). "The Palestinian National Charter: Resolutions of the Palestine National Council July 1-17, 1968". Yale Law School.
- Sufian, Sandra Marlene, and LeVine, Mark (2007) Reapproaching borders: new perspectives on the study of Israel-Palestine, Rowman & Littlefield, ISBN 0-7425-4639-X
- Swedenburg, Ted (1988) "The Role of the Palestinian Peasantry in the Great Revolt 1936–1939", in Islam, Politics, and Social Movements, edited by Edmund Burke III and Ira Lapidus. Berkeley: University of California Press. ISBN 0-520-06868-8 pp 189–194 & Marvin E. Gettleman, Stuart Schaar (2003) The Middle East and Islamic world reader, Grove Press, ISBN 0-8021-3936-1 pp 177–181
- Pappé Ilan (2004) A History of Modern Palestine: One Land, Two Peoples, Cambridge University Press, ISBN 0-521-55632-5
- Peretz, Don (1994) The Middle East Today, Greenwood Publishing Group, ISBN 0-275-94576-6
- Provence, Michael (2005) The Great Syrian Revolt and the Rise of Arab Nationalism, University of Texas Press, ISBN 0-292-70680-4
- Ross, Dennis (2005). The Missing Peace: The Inside Story of the Fight for Middle East Peace. Farrar, Straus and Giroux. ISBN 9780374708085.
- Sayigh, Yezid (1997). Armed Struggle and the Search for State:The Palestinian National Movement 1949-1993. Oxford University Press. ISBN 9780198292654.
- Shindler, Colin (2013). A history of modern Israel (2nd ed.). Cambridge: Cambridge university press. ISBN 9781107028623.
- Shlaim, Avi (reprint 2004) The Politics of Partition; King Abdullah, the Zionists and Palestine, 1921–1951, Oxford University Press ISBN 0-19-829459-X
- Winter, Dave (1999) Israel Handbook: With the Palestinian Authority Areas, Footprint Travel Guides, ISBN 1-900949-48-2
