= Al-Husayni family =

Palestinian political dynasty

Banu Ghadia Al-Ghadia al-Husseini بنو غضية آل غضية الحسيني
- Hussenid Arab tribe
- Nisba: Al-Husseini (Al-Husayni)
- Location: Mainly Jerusalem
- Descended from: Sheik Ghadia ibn Ammar ibn Abi Bakr ibn Abi al-Fadael ibn Yousha ibn Jamal al-Din ibn Barakat ibn Muhammad ibn Ali ibn Ahmed ibn Sharaf al-Din
- Parent tribe: Husaynids (claimed)
- Religion: Sunni Islam

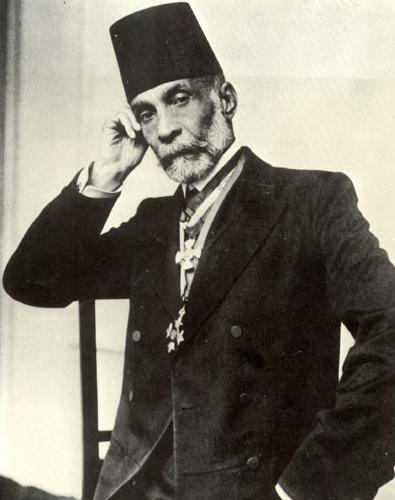
Musa al-Husayni was the Mayor of Jerusalem (1918–1920) and led the Palestinian national movement

Husayni (Arabic: الحسيني also spelled Husseini) is the name of a prominent Palestinian Arab clan formerly based in Jerusalem, which claims descent from Husayn ibn Ali (the son of Ali). The Husaynis follow the Hanafi school of Sunni Islam, in contrast to the Shafi'i school followed by most of the Arab Muslim population of Palestine.

== History ==
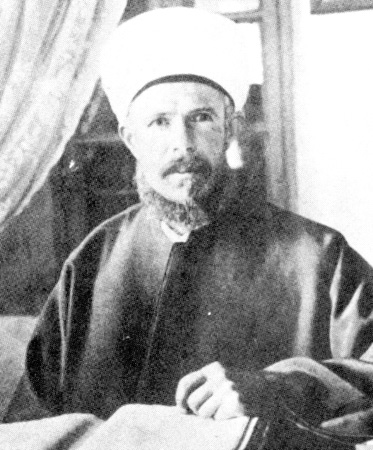
Kamil al-Husayni was the Grand Mufti of Jerusalem

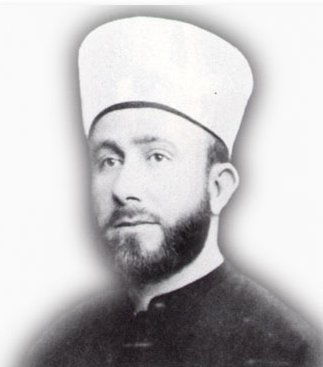
Mohammad Amin al-Husayni was the Grand Mufti of Jerusalem, and President of the Supreme Muslim Council

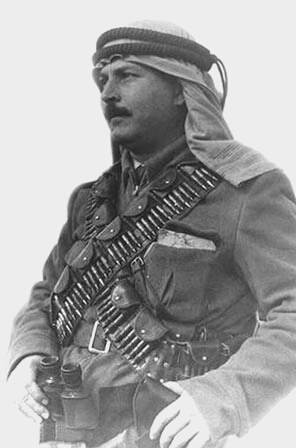
Abd al-Qadir al-Husayni led Palestinian irregular forces against the Haganah and other Jewish militias during the 1948 Arab-Israeli War. He died in combat in al-Qastal.

The Husaynis were a wealthy Yaman family that lived around the Jerusalem area in the Levant from the 18th century. Like most locals of the region, they tried to rebuild their lives following the devastation brought by Napoleon’s failed invasion of the Levant in 1799. However, by 1831 the ambitions of the Khedive Muhammad Ali Pasha grew so strong he invaded the Levant in defiance of the heavily weakened Ottoman Empire and imposed taxes so severe it caused the local population to rebel. Over the years, the Husaynis became a major force in this rebellion which solidified a cooperative relationship with the returning Ottoman authority. By the mid-1860s, this trust put the Husaynis in a position of power when the ruling Ottomans decided to end the Feudal system. Taking advantage of the situation, the Husaynis forged an alliance with other Yaman Arabs such as the once powerful Sheikh Abu Ghosh. The leader of a noble family who had once held full control over the pilgrimage route from the coast to Jerusalem. As their influence grew and the power of previous ruling elites waned, feuds gradually occurred in the old city of Jerusalem between the Husaynis and the leading Qay Arab families of Jerusalem including the Al-Khalidi and the Nashashibi and Barghouthi families. However these conflicts dealt with city positions and not with Qays–Yaman rivalry. The Husaynis later led opposition and propaganda movements against the Young Turks who controlled the Ottoman Empire.

By the time of the British Mandate the clan had hundreds of members and its several branches encompassed thousands. They were mostly concentrated in the Old City, however a large number of clan members also lived in the neighborhoods of Sheikh Jarrah, the German Colony, Katamon, Baka and Musrara. Several members of the clan were appointed to important political positions such as Mayor and Grand Mufti of Jerusalem. Musa al-Husayni was mayor of Jerusalem, 1918–1920. Mohammed Tahir al-Husayni was Grand Mufti of Jerusalem, 1860s-1908, followed by his son Kamil al-Husayni, 1908–1921, and then another son Mohammad Amin al-Husayni, 1921–1937. The main political rivals for the clan was the Nashashibi clan of Jerusalem, especially during the Mandate period. Before the formal commencement of the British Mandate, Musa and Amin al-Husayni incited the 1920 Palestine riots, resulting in many deaths. As a result, Musa was replaced as mayor by the head of the rival Nashashibi clan. Amin al-Husayni and Aref al-Aref were arrested, but when they were let out on bail they both escaped to Syria. A military court sentenced Amin in absentia to 10 years imprisonment, and he failed to qualify for a general amnesty in early 1921 because of his absence.

Unlike the Nashashibi clan, many Husayni clan members continued to lead opposition and propaganda movements against the British Mandate government and early Zionist immigrants. The clan founded and led many Palestinian Arab Islamist groups such as the Palestine Arab Party and the Arab Higher Committee. The clan was directly involved in disturbances including the 1920 Palestine riots and the 1936–1939 Arab revolt in Palestine. As a result of continuing disturbances and violence, the Arab Higher Committee was outlawed in October 1937 and Arab national leaders were rounded up by the British. One member of the clan, Amin al-Husayni, escaped arrest by fleeing to Syria. During World War II he went to Iraq then Iran and eventually to Italy and eventually arrived in Berlin. In Berlin, Amin al-Husayni was photographed with many important Nazi leaders including Adolf Hitler and Amin al-Husayni went to the Balkans on behalf of the Nazis to give speeches to recruits of the 13th Waffen SS division. Amin al-Husayni also broadcast pro-Axis statements into the Middle East on Nazi radio stations.

During 1947 Palestinian Civil War, the clan formed the Holy War Army led by Abd al-Qadir al-Husayni and Hasan Salama. The force, described as the Husayni's "personal army", was set up and operated independently of the Arab Liberation Army set up at the same time by the Arab League. The Holy War Army was also active during the 1948 Arab-Israeli War and Abd al-Qadir al-Husayni died in combat on 8 April 1948 at Qastal.

After the 1948 War, most of the clan relocated to Jordan and the Gulf States. Many family heads that remained in the Old City and the northern neighborhoods of East Jerusalem fled due to hostilities with the Israeli government. Amin al-Husayni was politically active from Cairo. In 1951 King Abdullah was assassinated in Jerusalem by a member of an underground Palestinian organization led by Daoud al-Husayni.

The Orient House, which belonged to former mayor Musa al-Husayni is located in East Jerusalem.

== List of notable members ==
- Abd al-Qadir al-Husayni (1907–8 April 1948) – Palestinian nationalist fighter, founder and leader of the Holy War Army. (Son of Musa al-Husayni).
- Adnan al-Husayni (1947-) – Director-General of Muslim Waqf which is responsible for Islamic religious sites in Jerusalem such as the Al-Aqsa Mosque and the Dome of the Rock.
- Daoud al-Husayni – Inspector-General of the Army of the Holy War and aide of Amin al-Husayni. Co-founder of Palestine Liberation Organization.
- Darwish al-Husayni – member of Arab Higher Committee.
- Fawzi Darwish al-Husseini (died 1946) was a Palestinian Arab political figure notable for leadership of the New Palestine Society (Filastin al-Jadida) and his interest in the political program of binationalism in Palestine during the Mandate period.
- Faysal al-Husayni (17 July 1940 – 31 May 2001) – founder and leader of Arab Studies Society, head of Fatah organization in West Bank and Palestinian Authority Minister for Jerusalem Affairs. (Son of Abd al-Qadir al-Husayni).
- Hasan ibn Abd al-Latif al-Husayni – Mufti of Jerusalem (1781-1806/7).
- Hatem Husseini (1940-1994) - Head of Palestinian Information Center in Washington DC, 1978–1982.
- Hind al-Husayni (25 April 1916 – 13 September 1994) – former member of Palestine National Council and founder of orphanage for Palestinian children. (Cousin of Abd al-Qadir al-Husayni).
- Hussein al-Husayni (unknown-1918) – Mayor of Jerusalem (1910–1917). (Son of Salim al-Husayni, brother of Musa al-Husayni).
- Ishaq Hatem al-Husayni – author and president of Al-Quds University.
- Ishaq Darwish (1896–1974) – member of the Arab Higher Committee, aide and nephew of Amin al-Husseini
- Jamal al-Husayni (1894-1982) – secretary to the executive committee of the Palestine Arab Congress and Supreme Muslim Council, founder of Palestine Arab Party and member of the Arab Higher Committee.
- Kamil al-Husayni (23 February 1867 – 31 March 1921) – second Grand Mufti of Jerusalem (1908–1921, followed by his brother Mohammad Amin al-Husayni). (Son of Mohammed Taher al-Husayni; brother of Mohammad Amin al-Husayni).
- Mohammad Amin al-Husayni (c. 1897–4 July 1974) – Palestinian nationalist leader, Grand Mufti of Jerusalem (1921–1948), founder of Army of the Holy War, leader of Arab Higher Committee. (Son of Mohammed Taher al-Husayni; brother of Kamil al-Husayni).
- Mohammed Tahir al-Husayni (1842–1908), full name: Mohammed Tahir Mustafa Tahir al-Husayni – Hanafi Mufti and Qadi (Chief Justice) of Jerusalem (1860s–1908), followed by his son Kamil al-Husayni in the similar position of Grand Mufti of Jerusalem).
- Musa al-Husayni (1853–1934) – Mayor of Jerusalem (1918–1920) and Chairman of Palestinian Arab Action Committee. (Son of Salim al-Husayni, brother of Hussein al-Husayni).
- Salim al-Husayni (unknown birth–1908) – Mayor of Jerusalem (1882-1897).
- Serene al-Husayni (1920–2008) – major contributor to Palestinian costumes. (Daughter of Jamal al-Husayni)
- Tewfiq al-Husayni – member of Arab Higher Committee.
- Leila Shahid (1949-2026) – Palestinian envoy to European Commission. (Daughter of Serene al-Husayni).
- Lena al-Husayni – Executive Director of the Arab American Family Support Center. (Great-granddaughter of Aref al-Husayni, Sheikh of al-Haram al Sharif).
- Rafiq al-Husayni, Chief of Staff to the President, Mahmoud Abbas.
- Yasser Arafat (full name Mohammed Abdel Rahman Abdel Raouf Arafat al-Qudwa al-Husseini, 1929-2004), the 1st President of the Palestinian National Authority.
- Sara Leila Husseini, Director of the British Palestinian Committee.

== See also ==
- Husseini
- Nashashibi
