= Fawzi Husseini =

Palestian politician (died 1946)

Fawzi Darwish al-Husseini
- فوزي درويش الحسيني
- Born: c. 1898
- Died: November 1946
- Cause of death: Assassination
- Occupation: Political activist
- Organization: New Palestine Society (Filastin al-Jadida)
- Known for: Advocacy of binationalism in Mandatory Palestine
- Movement: Binationalism
- Relatives: Jamal al-Husayni (cousin); Amin al-Husseini (distant relative)
- Family: Al-Husayni family

Fawzi Darwish al-Husseini (died 1946) was a Palestinian Arab political figure notable for leadership of the New Palestine Society (Filastin al-Jadida) and his interest in the political program of binationalism in Palestine during the Mandate period.

== Biography ==
Fawzi was a member of the prominent al-Husayni family. He was the cousin of Mufti Jamal al-Husseini and was a distant relative of Amin al-Husseini. According to the scholar Noam Chomsky, he participated in the 1929 riots and was imprisoned during the 1936–1939 revolt.

In his later years, al-Husseini became an active supporter of binationalism alongside such figures as Hayim Margolis-Kalwariski. Along with five other Palestinian leaders, he signed a formal agreement with Zionist organizations under the auspices of the League for Jewish-Arab Rapprochement and Co-Operation on November 11, 1946. Beforehand, he had given a public address in Haifa calling for a "bi-national independent Palestine" under the auspices of the United Nations.

Al-Husseini was assassinated in November 1946 for alleged treachery to the Palestinian Arab national cause, after signing the aforementioned agreement. He was killed by men sent by the Mufti Jamal, who later said "My cousin stumbled and received his proper punishment." He was 48 years old when he was killed.

== See also ==
- Mandatory Palestine
- Palestinian politics
- 20th-century Palestinian politicians
