= The Rise and Fall of a Palestinian Dynasty: The Husaynis, 1700–1948 =

2010 non-fiction book by Ilan Pappé

The Rise and Fall of a Palestinian Dynasty: The Husaynis 1700–1948
- Author: Ilan Pappé
- Language: English
- Genre: History
- Publisher: University of California Press
- Publication date: 2010
- Publication place: United States
- Media type: print
- Pages: 399

The Rise and Fall of a Palestinian Dynasty: The Husaynis, 1700–1948 is a 2010 history book written by Israeli historian Ilan Pappé and published by University of California Press. The book revolves around the Al-Husayni family of Jerusalem, which was a politically influential family in Palestine between the 18th and 20th century.

== Background ==
Ilan Pappé is part of what is known as the Israeli new historians, a group of academics who challenged the prevailing narratives regarding the history of the state of Israel by highlighting the cost of the partition of the land to the Palestinians. As part of this movement, Ilan Pappé has written several books regarding the Palestine-Israel conflict, however, in The Rise and Fall of a Palestinian Dynasty, he shifted his focus to chronicling the history of Palestine before World War II and the partition of Palestine.

== Summary ==
The Rise and Fall of a Palestinian Dynasty is a biographical retelling of the history of the Al-Husayni family of Jerusalem. It starts by telling the history of the Husaynis rising influence in the 18th century and detailing the social statuses of Al-Mufti and Al-Ashraf, which were titles used for religious and clan leaders. Chapters 2 and 3 of the book detail how the family used political marriages to cement its status and its relationship to the Ottoman leadership in Istanbul. Chapters 4 and 5 discuss the final years of the Ottoman empire and the turmoil caused by its declining control ending with the collapse of the empire during World War I. Chapter 6 focuses on Al Husaynis role during the period of the British occupation of Palestine between 1917-1920 and the struggle against British military rule led by them and other influential families.

With Chapter 7, Pappé details the Palestinian Arabs' responses to the growing Zionist movement. Starting by the Arabs' reaction to the Balfour declaration and the various attempt at organizing and sending delegations to leaders around the world to make the case for Palestinian independence. The chapter ends with the details of the meeting between a Palestinian delegation, led by Musa Kazim Pasha al-Husayni and Winston Churchill, which ended with the delegation feeling unable to reverse the course of the Belfour declaration.

The last three chapters focus on one of the most prolific members of the family, the Grand Mufti Amin al-Husseini, his involvement in internal struggles inside Palestine, his rise in power after the 1936–1939 Arab revolt against the British mandate, and his later exile to Syria, then Iraq and from there to Europe. The book ends with the lead up to 1948 Arab-Israeli war in which several of the Husaynis lead military factions. The war, which ended with the displacement of many Palestinians, in what is known as the Nakba, also signified the end of the Husaynis' influence in Palestinian politics, even though some of them survived in exile.

== Critical reception ==
The Rise and Fall of a Palestinian Dynasty has, as with many books concerning the history of Palestine, received scrutiny particularly within academic circles, where lengthy reviews of the book were written. In his review published in the Journal of World History, Professor Weldon C. Matthews praised the book for its style and for humanizing the Palestinian nationalist movement. The review gives credit to the book for sticking to historical records and not ascribing motives to members of AL-Husayni family who had different political leanings and did not act as a unit as other sources might suggest.

On the other hand, Meir Litvak, in his review published in "The Middle East Book Review" criticized the book for omitting some important events agreed upon by other historians, as well as cast doubts on Pappé's motives when it comes to what events to focus on and what references to use, describing some references as selective and mostly from writers sympathetic to the Palestinian cause.

== See also ==
- Al-Husayni family
- Musa al-Husayni
- Amin al-Husseini
