= Yaqoub Farraj =

Palestinian politician

Yaqoub Farraj (Arabic: يعقوب نقولا فراج; also Romanized Ya'cub or Yacoub Farraj) was a Palestinian political leader during the British colonial period. He was deputy mayor of Jerusalem during the 1930s and succeeded Musa Kazem Pasha al-Huseini as head of the Palestine Executive Committee in 1934. He was described by historian Walid Khalidi as "doyen of the Palestinian Greek Orthodox community."
