= Hussein al-Husayni =

Mayor of Jerusalem (1909–1917)

Hussein Bey al-Husayni
- حسين الحسيني
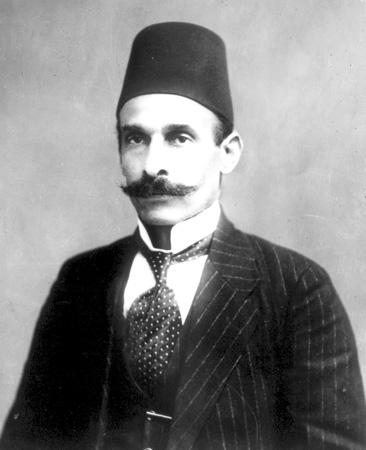
- Portrait of al-Husayni during his term as mayor

Mayor of Jerusalem
- In office 1909–1917
- Preceded by: Yousef al-Khalidi
- Succeeded by: Aref al-Dajani

Personal details
- Born: Jerusalem, Ottoman Empire
- Died: 1918
- Occupation: Politician

Hussein Bey al-Husayni (Arabic: حسين الحسيني; died 1918) was a Palestinian politician who served as mayor of Jerusalem from 1909 to 1917, the last years of Ottoman rule over the city.

Born into the prominent Jerusalemite Arab family of al-Husayni, his father Salim al-Husayni had also served as mayor of the city. He was first elected to the position with 648 of 1200 electors' votes. He was re-elected in 1914, earning votes from local Muslims, Jews, and Christians.

Under Hussein's leadership, the city went through high development; al-Husayni initiated the paving of roads, which ensured cleaner streets, and started construction of a sewage network, which was partly financed by Jewish communities from outside Palestine. In an interview with the Egyptian newspaper Al-Iqdam in March 1914, he stressed the distinction between Zionism, which did not threaten Palestine, and he believed to be the real risk to the local Arab community from the Jewish settlers movement; and the subsequent necessity to prevent land sales to Jews. Al-Husayni also served as Director of the Red Crescent Society, established in 1915 and promoted Arab-Jewish understanding.

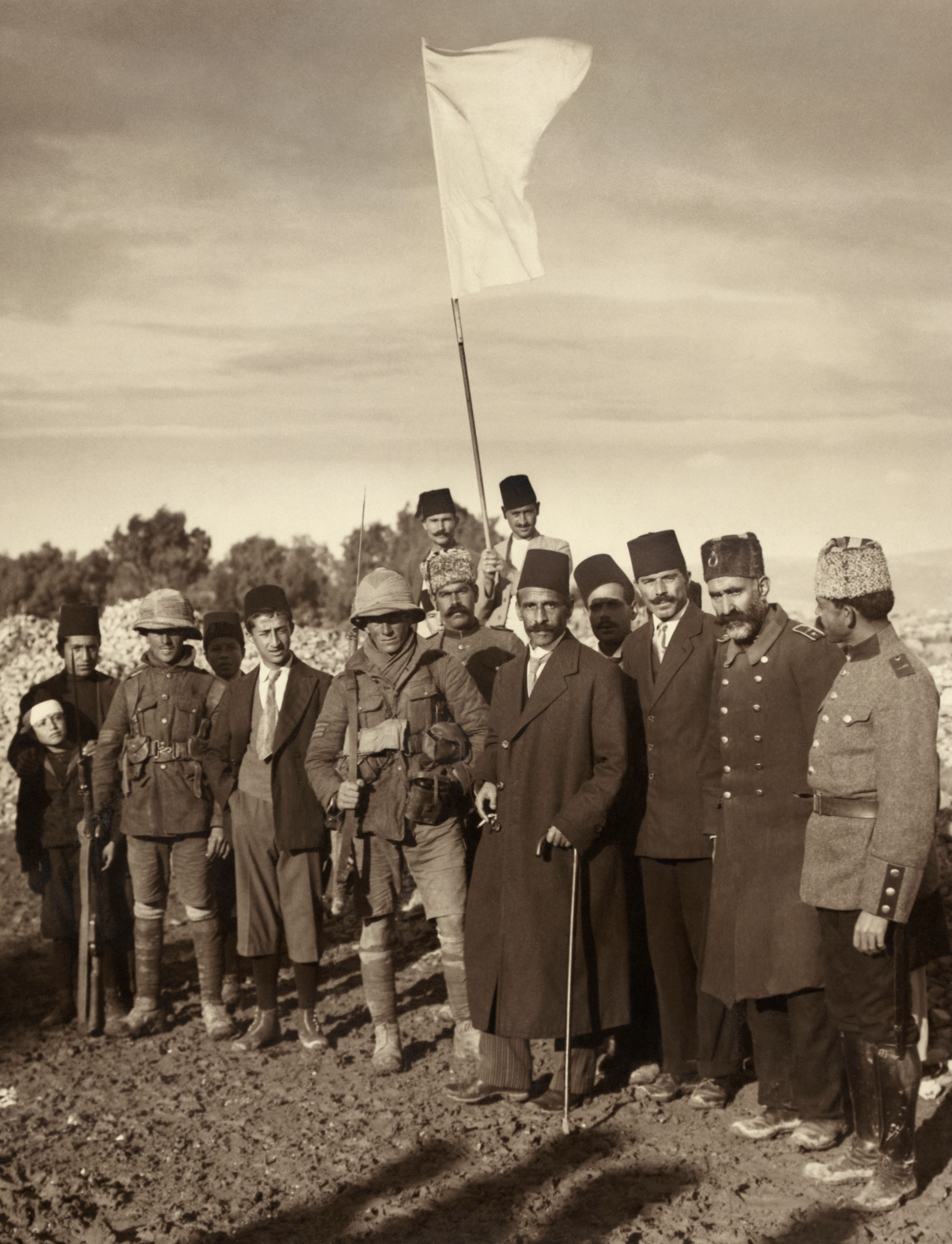
al-Husayni under the white flag of surrender, 9 December 1917 at 8 a.m.

He helped foster Muslim, Jewish and Christian cooperation in an attempt to create a "post-Ottoman" alternative. On 9 December 1917, after the Allied forces led by General Allenby had forced the Ottoman defenders out of the city, al-Husayni formally surrendered Jerusalem to the British Military Administration. He signed an official decree of surrender a few days later, handing the keys of the city gates to Allenby. A couple of weeks after the surrender in January 1918, he died. After a brief term by Aref al-Dajani, Hussein's brother Musa al-Husayni became mayor of Jerusalem.
