= Salim al-Husayni =

Mayor of Jerusalem (1882–1897)

Salim Effendi al-Husayni
- سليم الحسيني

Mayor of Jerusalem
- In office 1882–1897

Personal details
- Born: Unknown
- Died: 1908
- Children: Hussein al-Husayni, Mousa Kazim al-Husayni

Salim Effendi al-Husayni (Arabic: سليم الحسيني; died 1908) was Mayor of Jerusalem from 1882 to 1897. Hussein al-Husayni and Mousa Kazim al-Husayni, later mayors of the city, were his sons. He was a member of the Jerusalem Council and belonged to the prominent al-Husayni clan of Jerusalem. He built a palace in the city, which his granddaughter Hind al-Husseini later developed into the Dar al-Tifl Institution, which sheltered and educated orphaned children. Al-Husayni died in 1908 and is buried in the neighborhood of Sheikh Jarrah, near the American Colony Hotel.

He is praised in The Diaries of Wasif Jawhariyyeh, a memoir of a Jerusalem resident under his mayorship.

Hajj Salim al-Husseini rose to a high status in the country, and the Ottoman government had to bear him in mind, given his patriotic stances and the love that people—particularly the farmers—had for him. He was, God bless his soul, a member of the Administrative Council of Jerusalem and head of Jerusalem’s municipality for twenty-two years and truly served the city. It was he who had the public sewage system built within the wall. He is also responsible for paving the streets of Old Jerusalem, which he both conceived and saw through, thus transforming the city into a model for cleanliness, beauty, and marvel, particularly for foreigners who used to come to visit its holy sites.

— Wasif Jawhariyyeh, The Storyteller of Jerusalem
