= Aref al-Dajani =

Arab Palestinian politician (1856–1930)

Aref Basha al-Dajani
- عارف الدجاني
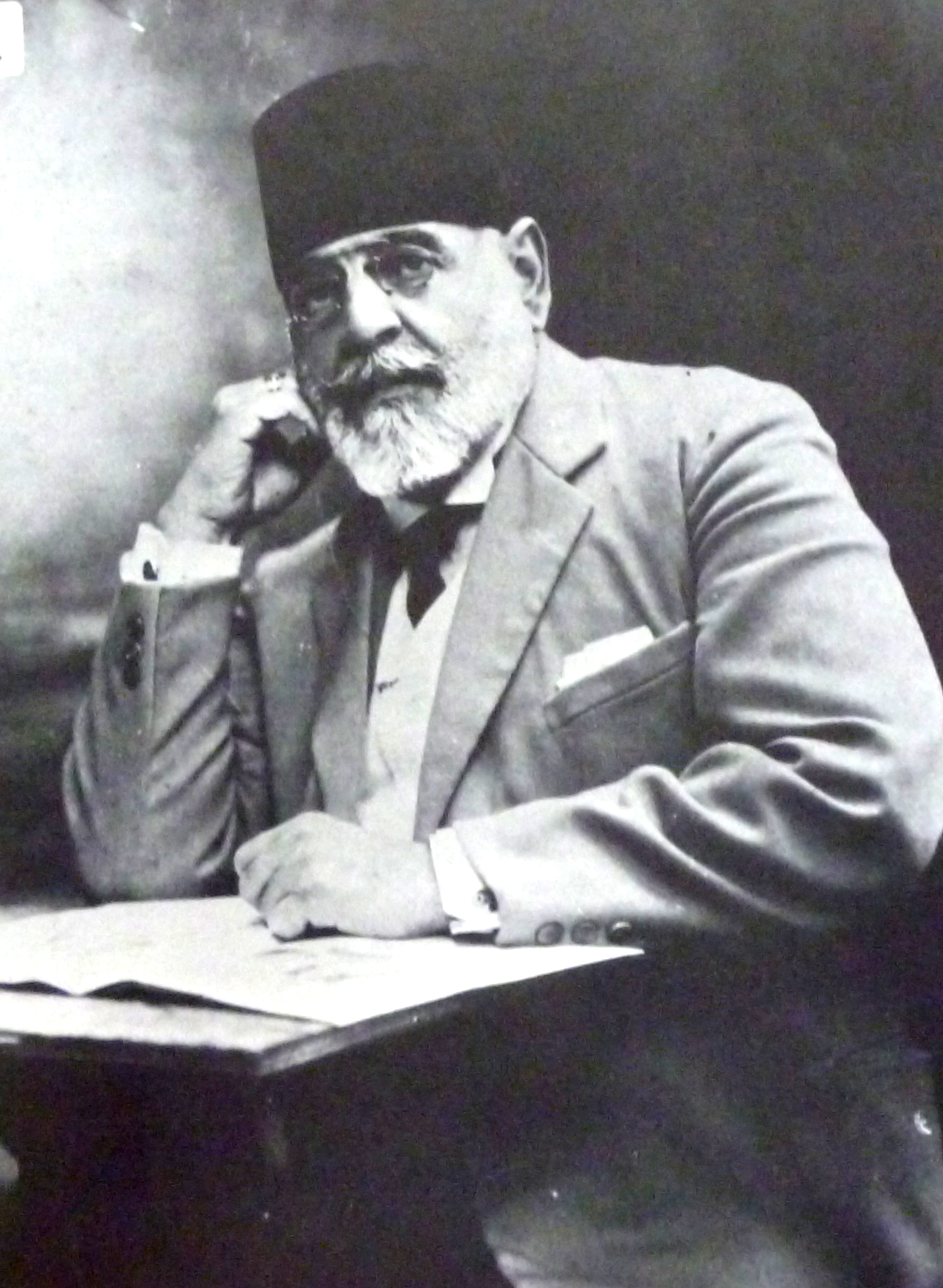

Mayor of Jerusalem
- In office 1917–1918
- Preceded by: Hussein al-Husayni
- Succeeded by: Musa Kazim al-Husayni

Chairman of the Jerusalem Congress
- In office 1919–1919

Deputy President of the Committee of Notables
- In office 1920–?

Personal details
- Born: 1856 Jerusalem
- Died: 14 April 1930 (aged 73–74)
- Occupation: Politician

Aref Basha al-Dajani (Arabic: عارف الدجاني; 1856 – April 14, 1930) was an Arab Palestinian politician who served as mayor of Jerusalem in 1917–1918.

Aref al-Dajani was born in Jerusalem in 1856.

== Political activism ==
In 1918, after serving for one year as mayor of Jerusalem, al-Dajani joined the Administrative Committee of the Muslim-Christian Association (MCA) and went on to become Jerusalem and then regional president of the organization. The Jerusalem Congress convened January 27 – February 10, 1919, under the leadership of Aref al-Dajani and Izzat Darwazah. The resolution reached at this forum was cabled to the Paris Peace Conference on behalf of the Arabs of Palestine, demanding a renunciation of the Balfour Declaration and the inclusion of Palestine as "an integral part of...the independent Arab Government of Syria within an Arab Union, free of any foreign influence or protection."

As chairman of the Jerusalem Congress, al-Dajani rejected political Zionism and agreed to accept British assistance on condition that it did not impinge on Arab sovereignty in Palestine. He envisaged Palestine as part of an independent Syrian state governed by Faisal of the Hashemite family.

In a speech to the King-Crane Commission in 1919, as a leader of the delegation for the Muslim-Christian Association, he stated,

“It is impossible for us to make an understanding with them [the Jews] or even to live them together… Their history and all their past proves that it is impossible to live with them. In all the countries where they are at present they are not wanted and undesirables, because they always arrive to suck the blood of everybody, and to become economically and financially victorious. If the League of Nations will not listen to the appeal of the Arabs this country will become a river of blood.”

In September 1920, al-Dajani became deputy president of a committee of notables established by the Pan-Islamic Movement. In his opening speech, he read letters received from Turkey and India, and called for Pan-Islamic ideals to be embraced by Palestinian Muslims.

During 1921 al-Dajani was the Muslim assessor for the Haycraft Commission of Inquiry cross examining witnesses.

Al-Dajani was branded a conspirator by E. Quigley, assistant director of Public Security during the British Mandate.

He was a member of the Arab Executive until 1922. Together with Raghib al-Nashashibi, in the early 1920s he led the opposition before splitting in 1926.
