= Muslim-Christian Associations =

Number of historical political clubs in Palestine

Flag used during the 1936–1939 Arab revolt in Palestine, displaying a Christian cross and an Islamic crescent in the red triangle

The Muslim-Christian Associations (Arabic: الجماعه الإسلامية المسيحية, romanized: al-Jāmiʿa al-ʾIslāmiyya al-Masīḥiyya) were a number of political clubs established in Palestine in the aftermath of the British defeat of the Ottoman army and their establishment of a military government in Palestine in 1918. The MCO soon formed a national body, the Palestine Arab Congress, which tried to influence the developing British policy in Palestine and counter the influence of the Zionist Commission which visited Palestine in April 1918. The main platform of these groups were independence, opposition to the Balfour Declaration and the idea of a Jewish National Home in Palestine, as well as opposition to mass Jewish immigration.

The Muslim-Christian Associations are regarded as the first manifestations of a broad based Palestinian Nationalist movement. By the end of the 1920s they had ceased to be important. The membership was from the upper classes and they proved to be ineffective in halting the Zionist advances and failed to provide leadership for a public that was becoming increasingly concerned about the future.

== History ==
The first Muslim-Christian Association was founded in Jaffa, 8 May 1918, with al-Hajj Ragib al-Dajani as its president. The membership were prominent members of Jaffa society. The Jaffa group was largely pro-British, partly because the citrus export industry needed to maintain good relations with the authorities. Also the military governor of Jaffa, Colonel Hubbard, had good relations with the Arabs of the town. According to Israeli politician, Aharon Cohen, the Association was Hubbard's idea. In November 1918, to mark the anniversary of Allenby's victory over the Turks, the Jaffa Association presented the governor with a statement expressing their confidence in British promises of self-government and self-determination. They also emphasized that Palestine was an Arab country and expressed their opposition to Zionists claims to the land. In May 1919 the Jaffa Association held a mass meeting in the Zohar Cinema with about 500 people attending. The main resolutions called for independence, recognition of Palestine as being part of Greater Syria and opposition to Jewish immigration. After two hours the meeting got out of control and the military authorities closed it down.

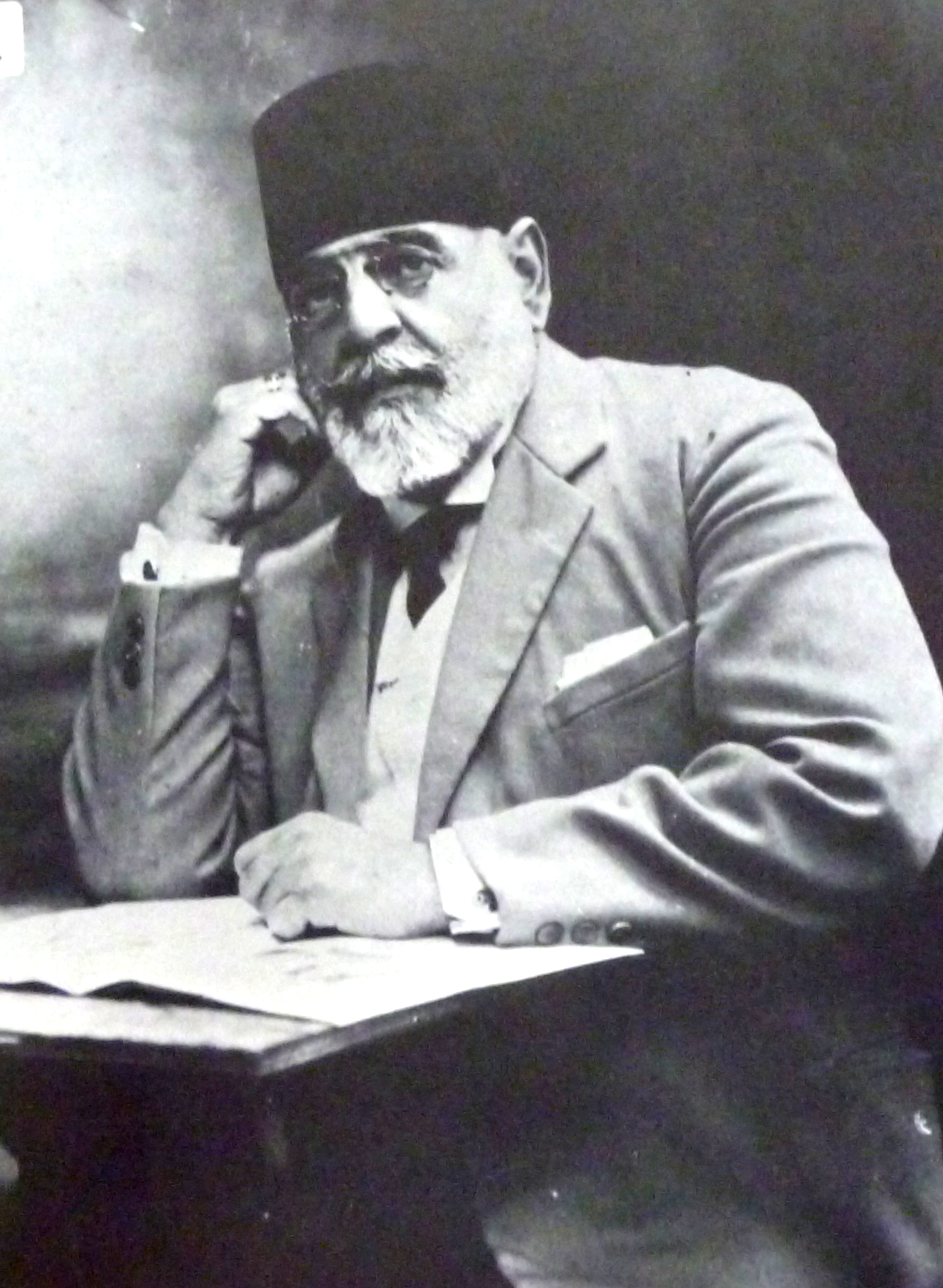
Aref Basha al-Dajani

The first head of the Jerusalem Muslim-Christian Association was Arif Pasha Dajani. On 24 November 1918 the British military governor of Jerusalem, Ronald Storrs, warned the mayor, Musa Kazem al-Husseini, and other notables that membership of the Muslim-Christian Association was incompatible with an administrative or a political career. The following year, between 27 January and 10 February 1919, the Associations held a Congress in Jerusalem. Most of the delegates were elderly and from privileged backgrounds. The group was already losing touch with the more radical opinions of the general population. In March, the Jerusalem Association proposed holding a demonstration on 1 April 1919 to protest against the Zionist program. This was called off after the authorities denied permission. Similarly, in May 1919, the Association proposed issuing a circular presenting their views in anticipation of the arrival of the Inter-Allied Commission. The statement emphasized the unity of Palestine and Syria and rejected the idea of a Jewish National Home while acknowledging the rights of the existing Jewish population. General Allenby refused permission for it to be issued and the circular was withdrawn.

The British authorities allowed the Associations to hold a two-day general strike, 13–14 July 1920, protesting against the mandate and the behaviour of the army.

Following the Nabi Musa riots the Jerusalem Association issued a statement, 11 November 1921, protesting the harsh sentences given to Arab demonstrators compared to those given to Jews arrested. They also announced their refusal to cooperate with British plans to demand security bonds from those suspected of security offences. But the group was losing credibility with the public, it was seen as ineffective in the face of growing Zionist activity. The following month a Zionist attempt to smuggle weapons into Palestine was intercepted in Haifa.

The Societies boycotted the swearing-in ceremony of the first high commissioner, Herbert Samuel, 11 September 1922. His arrival coincided with Atatürk's victories against the Greeks, which was greatly exciting Muslim public opinion.

In the autumn of 1923 the Jaffa association ceased to function after the municipality agreed to accept the Rutenburg Scheme which would supply the town with electricity but which was opposed by the national Congress.

At their peak in 1920 there were some 40 Associations with approximately 3,000 active members.

== Opposition ==
In 1922 a number of Muslim National Associations began to appear, which were funded by the Zionist Executive in an attempt to undermine the influence of the Muslim-Christian Associations and the Congress. Colonel Frederick Kisch was given the task of cultivating pro-Zionist opinion among the Arabs, with a budget of £20,000. In 1923 the Jerusalem Muslim National Club was being given £100 a month, the Tiberias club was given a lump sum of £200. The funds were also used to bribe many senior notables as well as the mayors of Jerusalem, Nablus, Tiberias and Beisan. In 1923 the chief secretary to the high commissioner, Colonel Wyndham Deedes, ordered investigations into some of the leaders of the Muslim National Associations. The final report concluded that the people involved were untrustworthy and the strategy was only likely to have a negative impact. Both David Ben-Gurion and Ze'ev Jabotinsky were against the policy.
