= Reuven Paz =

Israeli expert on Islam (1950–2015)

Reuven Paz (Hebrew: ראובן פז; November 14, 1950 – February 22, 2015) was an Israeli expert on Islam and Islamist movements in the Arab and Muslim world, the Arab minority in Israel, and Islamic Fundamentalism. He was Senior Research Fellow at the Global Research in International Affairs Center, Interdisciplinary Center Herzliya. He had also been head of research at the Israeli General Security Service. Previously, he lectured at the University of Haifa and served as Academic Director at the International Policy Institute for Counter-Terrorism.

In 2003, he founded the Project for the Research of Islamist Movements.

Paz was born in Haifa and received his Ph.D. from the University of Haifa in Middle Eastern History. He published several dozen academic articles and authored four books on Islamist movements. In addition, he provided expert testimony in court cases in the United States on several occasions.
