= Hatem Ishaq Husseini =

Palestinian academic and President of Al-Quds University

Hatem Ishaq Husseini (1941–December 27, 1994) was a Palestinian academic and president of Al-Quds University. He was the first President of Al-Quds University.

== Early life ==
Husseini was born in 1941 in Jerusalem. His father was Ishak and mother was Ulwiya Husseini. His family was forced to flee to Aleppo, Syria in March 1948 during the Nakba. He moved with his family to Beirut after his father got a job at the American University of Beirut. They moved to Cairo after his father got a job at the American University in Cairo. His parents invested their life savings to build a home in East Jerusalem, but that was stopped by the Six-Day War.

Husseini studied at the American University of Beirut and graduated from the American University in Cairo with a bachelor in economics. He completed an MBA at the University of Rhode Island. He completed his PhD at the University of Massachusetts in 1969.

== Career ==
Husseini taught at Shaw University, Smith College, and the University of Maryland. He gave a lecturer at Duke University. He wrote The Palestine Problem and Toward Peace in Palestine in 1974. He was a member of the Organization of Arab Students. On 24 April 1976, he wrote an opinion piece, Yearning for Palestine, for the New York Times in which he called for peaceful future for Arabs and Jews. He joined the Fatah party and in 1977 he became a member of the Palestinian National Council. He was appointed director of the League of Arab States office in Washington, DC. He founded the Palestinian Information Office in Washington DC in 1978 to represent Palestinian interests in America and improve ties.

Husseini became deputy director of the Permanent Observer Mission of the State of Palestine to the United Nations. In 1983, he hosted Charlie Bitton, Israeli member of parliament, at a luncheon in New York City. In 1993, he returned to Jerusalem to become the President of Al-Quds University. He attempted to combine four colleges under the University but was denied permission by the Israeli government who deemed it illegal and issued four different licenses.

== Personal life ==
Husseini was married to Rabee'a.

== Death ==
Husseini died on 27 December 1994 in Jerusalem from cancer.
