= Ishaq Darwish =

Palestinian politician (1896–1974)

- إسحاق درويش
- Born: Mohammad Ishaq Darwish; 1896
- Died: 1974 (aged 77–78)

Ishaq Darwish (Arabic: إسحاق درويش; 1896–1974) was a Palestinian political figure and served as a member of the Arab Higher Committee in 1947. He is known for being an aide to Amin al-Husseini who was his maternal uncle.

== Early life and education ==
Darwish was born in Jerusalem, Ottoman Palestine, in 1896. He was educated in Beirut.

== Career and activities ==
Following his graduation Darwish joined the Ottoman army during World War I. After the end of the war he returned to Jerusalem and became a member of the Arab Club chaired by Amin al-Husseini in 1918. Darwish's tenure at the organization ended in 1920. He also served the first secretary of the Muslim-Christian Association.

Darwish functioned as an aide to Amin al-Husseini and worked as a teacher during the British rule in Palestine. Darwish was among the founders of the Independence Party which was established in 1932. He was assigned by Musa Alami as a representative of the Palestinians in the meetings with the Italian officials from 1936. In the early 1940s he was served as a negotiator between Amin al-Husseini and the Arab exiles in Istanbul. He became a member of the Fourth Arab Higher Committee in 1947.

== Later years and death ==
Following the 1948 Palestine war Darwish left Palestine and settled in Beirut and then in London. He died in 1974.
