= Palestine Arab Congress =

Formal structure representing Muslim-Christian Associations

Between 1919 and 1928, the Palestinian Arab population in the British Mandate of Palestine held a series of congresses, organized by a nationwide network of local Muslim-Christian Associations. Seven congresses were held in Jerusalem, Jaffa, Haifa and Nablus. Despite broad public support their executive committees were never officially recognised by the British, who claimed they were unrepresentative. After the British defeat of Ottoman forces in 1918, the British established military rule and (later) civil administration of Palestine. The Palestine Arab Congress and its organizers in the Muslim-Christian Associations were formed when the country's Arab population began coordinated opposition to British policies.

== First congress: Jerusalem, 1919 ==
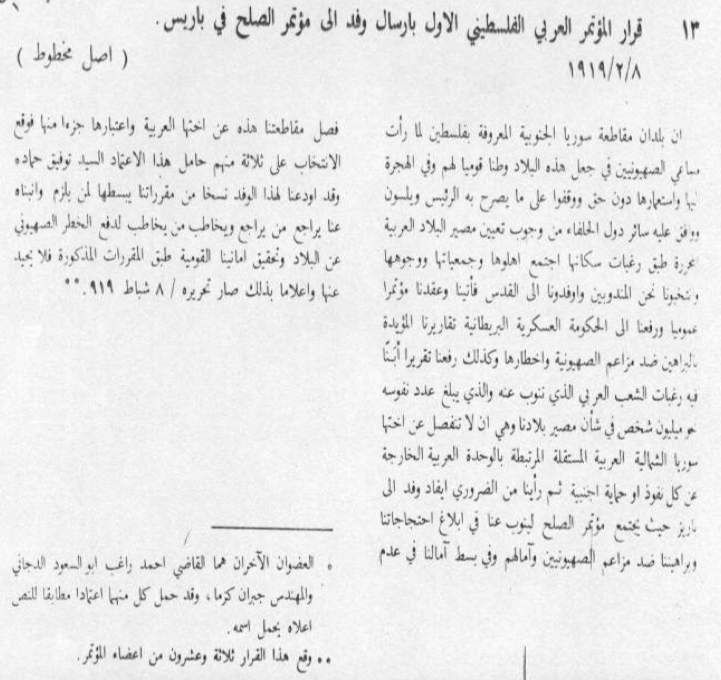
First Palestine Arab Congress resolution in 1919, addressed to the Paris Peace Conference.

In response to Jewish immigrants settling before the war, the first Palestine Arab Congress met from 27 January to 10 February 1919, with 27 delegates from Muslim-Christian societies across Palestine. It was presided over by Aref al-Dajani, president of the Jerusalem Muslim-Christian Society. Also present were Izzat Darwaza and Yousef El-Issa, editor of Falastin. Most delegates were from the propertied class, and were evenly divided into pro-British and pan-Arab factions. A cable was sent to the Paris Peace Conference, demanding a renunciation of the Balfour Declaration and the inclusion of Palestine as "an integral part of...the independent Arab Government of Syria within an Arab Union, free of any foreign influence or protection".

The Congress rejected political Zionism, agreeing to accept British assistance if it did not impinge on Arab sovereignty in the region. Palestine was envisaged as part of an independent Syrian state, governed by Faisal of the Hashemite family.

The resolutions of the Jerusalem Congress were as follows:

- "We consider Palestine nothing but part of Arab Syria and it has never been separated from it at any stage. We are tied to it by national, religious, linguistic, moral, economic, and geographic bounds."
- Rejection of French claims to the area
- "Our district Southern Syria or Palestine should be not separated from the Independent Arab Syrian Government and be free from all foreign influence and protection"
- All foreign treaties referring to the area are deemed void
- To maintain friendly relations with Britain and the Allied powers, accepting help if it did not affect the country's independence and Arab unity

It was decided to send a delegation to Damascus and representatives attended the Syrian National Congress in Damascus on 8 June 1919 "to inform Arab patriots there of the decision to call Palestine Southern Syria and unite it with Northern Syria", while three members were chosen to attend the Peace Conference in Paris. Failing to elect an executive committee, the congress agreed to meet in three months

== Second congress: Damascus, 1920 ==
The authorities had banned all Arab political gatherings and prevented the congress convening on 15 May 1920 after the San Remo conference. Some of the would-be delegates sent a letter to the Syrian National Congress, stating their position and asking that they form a Palestinian delegation from Palestinian representatives present in Damascus that would travel directly to Europe to defend the Palestinian case. Shemesh says that there are a number of versions as to its timing and actual occurrence but quotes the memoirs of Izzat Darwaza with a version similar to the preceding statement..

According to the Survey of Palestine, the delegates met earlier in Damascus on 27 February 1920. Allawai, Faisal's biographer, confirms this date and that while the delegates were assembling in Damascus for the recalled Syrian National Congress, a large number of Palestinians had already gathered in Damascus and organised themselves into the ‘Palestinian Congress’. They posited an independent Palestine within a united Syrian state, denounced Zionism, and demanded an end to Jewish immigration.

On 31 May, Palestinian emigres met at the Arab Club in Damascus and resolved to form 'The Palestinian Arab Society'. The officers of the Society were Haj Amin al-Husseini, Izzat Darwaza and ‘Aref al-‘Aref. The Society protested against the San Remo Conference's decision to grant Britain a mandate over Palestine and against Samuel's appointment. It also appealed to the Muslims of India and to the Pope, drawing attention to the Jewish danger in Palestine. Ilan Pappé says that the second congress was held in secret in Palestine on 31 May 1920, because British military authorities had banned all Arab political gatherings and a statement was issued calling for the return of all political deportees, and to protest against the San Remo Conference decision to include the words of the Balfour Declaration in the text of the British mandate over Palestine. It is unclear if this is the same event, as names given by Pappé are given by other sources as being in Damascus, not Palestine.

== Third congress: Haifa, 1920 ==
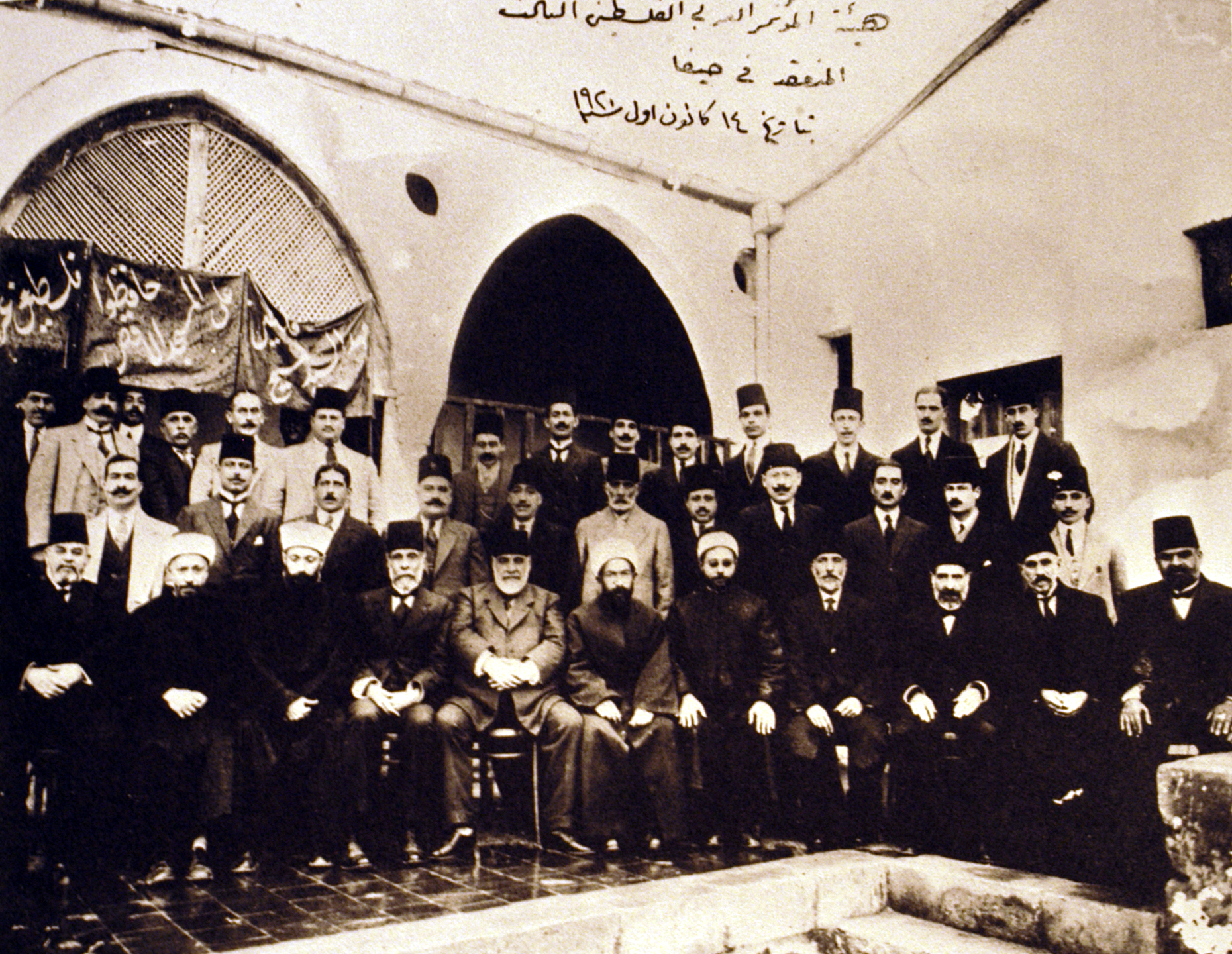
Third Congress

The third congress opened on 4 December. It was attended by 36 delegates, including Pasha Aref Dajani the Mayor of Jerusalem 1918 (seated fifth from the left next to Pasha Musa Kazem Husseini in the accompanying picture), Sheik Suleiman al-Taji Al-Faruqi and head of the Catholic community Bullus Shehadeh. The congress was opened by Haifa's mufti, Muhammad Murad. Recently deposed mayor of Jerusalem Musa al-Husayni was elected president and chairman of the nine-member executive committee, a post he held until his death in 1934. It resolved as follows:

- Called for Palestine to be part of the independent Arab state promised in the McMahon–Hussein Correspondence. Calls for unity with Syria were dropped but unity between Palestine and Syria re-emerging at a later date was not ruled out.
- Condemned the notion of a homeland for the Jewish people in Palestine.
- Called on the British to establish "a national government responsible to representative assembly, whose members would be chosen from the Arabic-speaking people who inhabited Palestine until the outbreak of the War" (but without explicitly rejecting British presence in Palestine). The model was based on the terms of the Mandate of Iraq, with a parliament elected by a one-citizen-one-vote system, which accepted overall British control.
- Objected to the recognition of the World Zionist Organization as an official body and the use of Hebrew as an official language.
- Opposed Jewish immigration.
- Declared the British administration illegal, since the League of Nations had not yet reached a decision about the status of the territory.

Some delegates, such as Issa El-Issa, complained that the congress was not sufficiently radical. After the congress the executive committee met British High Commissioner Herbert Samuel, who insisted that they accept British policy on the Jewish national homeland to receive official recognition. The British position that the congress was not representative led to a broad campaign by the Muslim-Christian Associations to raise public awareness.

In March 1921 Musa Kazem led a delegation from the executive committee to meet the British Colonial Secretary Winston Churchill, who had called a conference in Cairo to decide British policy in the Middle East. Churchill agreed to meet the delegation, but refused to discuss any issues until after the conference. On his journey back to London he met with members of the executive committee in Jerusalem on 28 March 1921, telling them they had to accept the Balfour Declaration as an immutable part of British policy.

== Fourth congress: Jerusalem, 1921 ==
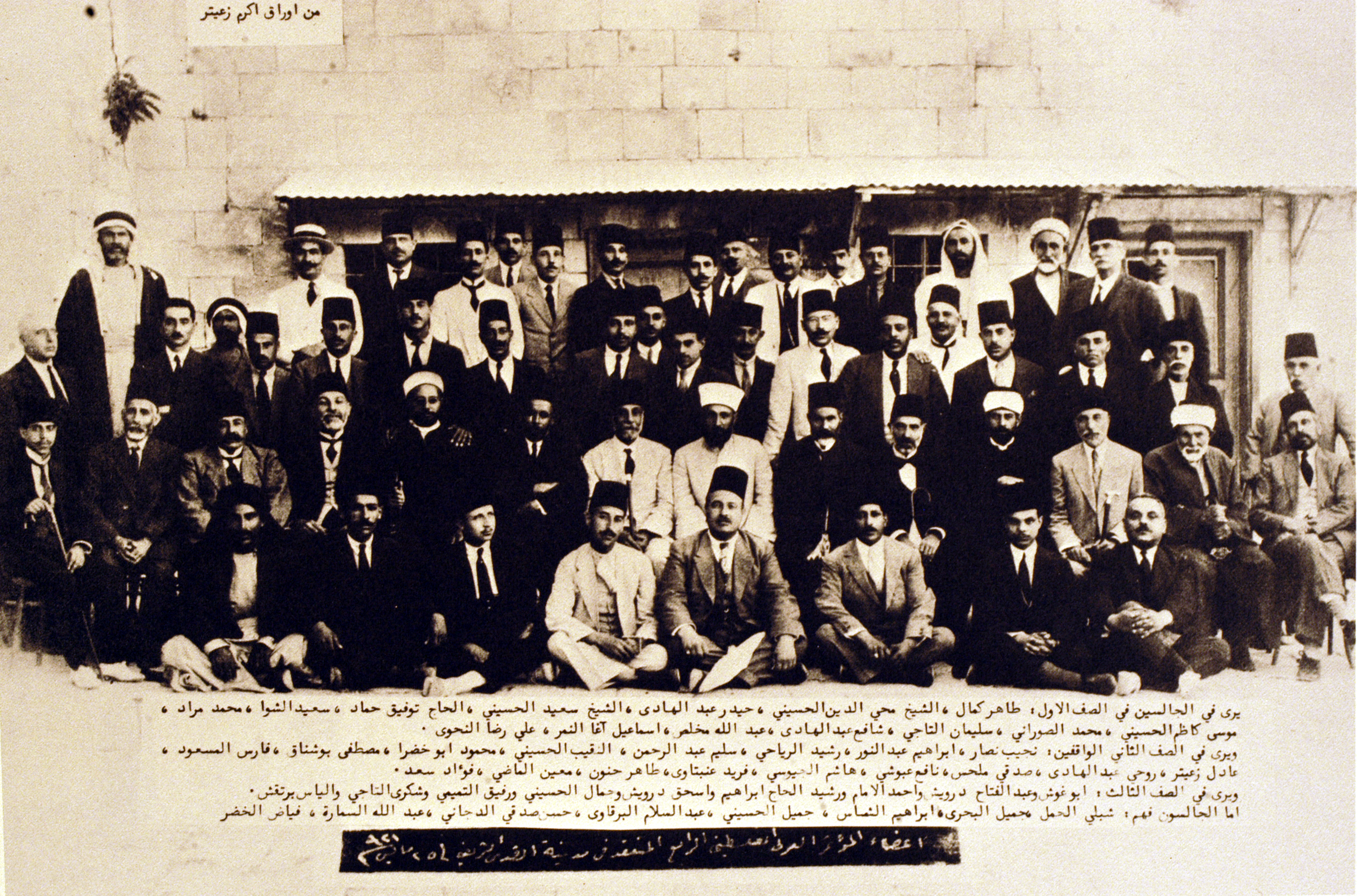
Fourth congress

The fourth congress, on 25 June 1921, was attended by about 100 delegates who voted to send a six-man delegation (led by Musa Kazim) to London. The delegates arrived in London in September and met with the Secretary of State for the Colonies, Winston Churchill. On their way, they met Pope Benedict XV in Vatican City and attempted to meet with delegates to the League of Nations in Geneva. Responding to the congress, High Commissioner Herbert Samuel promised that the British would "never impose a policy contrary to their religions, their political and their economic interests".

== Fifth congress: Nablus, 1922 ==
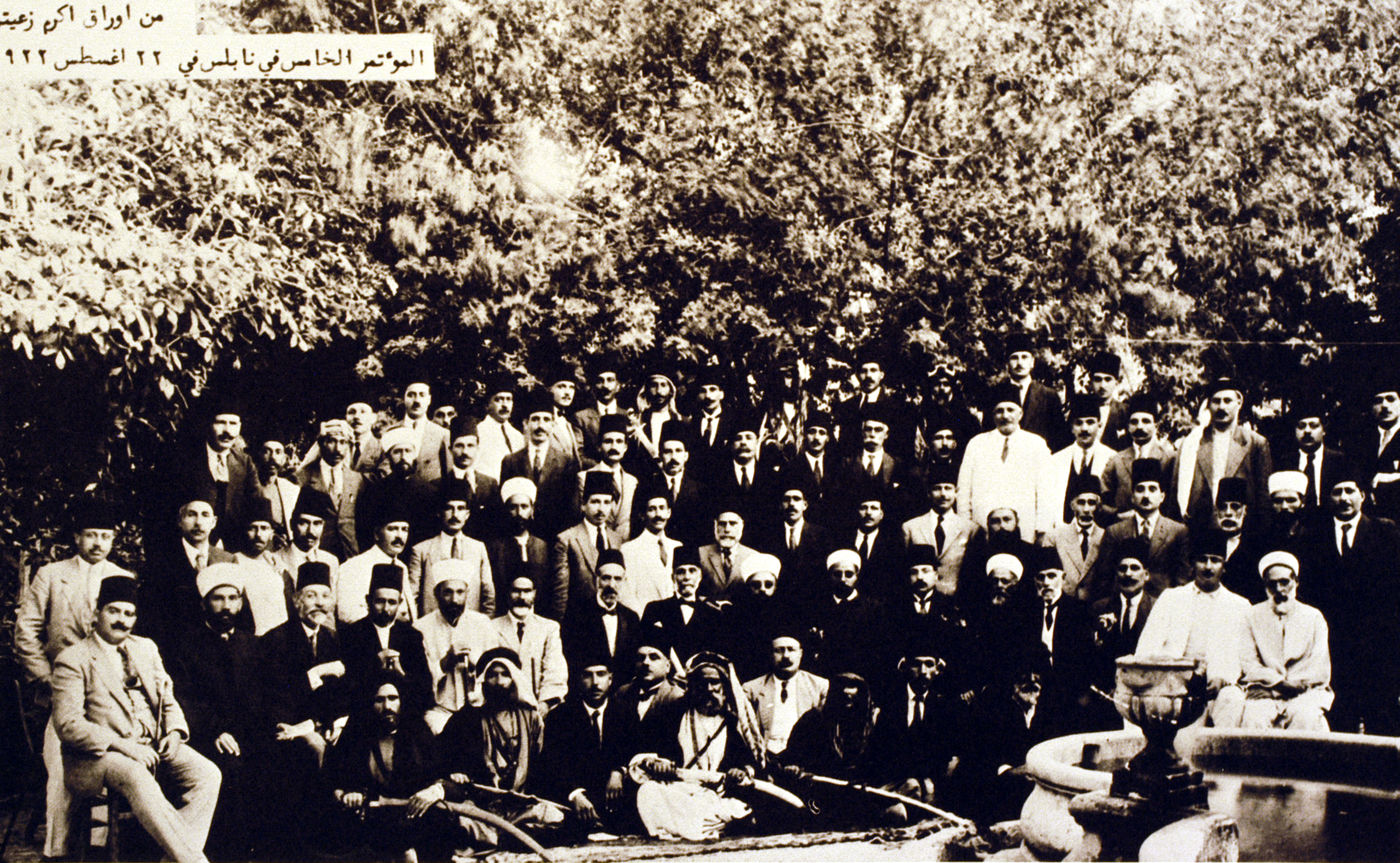
Fifth congress

The fifth congress opened on 22 August 1922, after the return of the London delegation. Its leader, Musa Kazem, opposed anti-British agitation and discouraged the use of violence; he reported that possibilities still existed for progress through negotiations. The following resolutions were passed:

- Rejecting the new constitution.
- Boycotting elections for the proposed Legislative Council.
- Establishing a London bureau.
- Boycotting Jewish goods, including Pinhas Rutenberg's planned electricity supply.
- Forbidding land sales to Jews.
- Forbidding Jewish immigration.
- Pledging to oppose the establishment of a Jewish national homeland.

Before the congress, its executive committee launched a fundraising campaign supporting a general strike held on 13–14 July 1922. Funds were raised from sales of National Movement stamps selling for one, two and five millims. The stamps depicted the Dome of the Rock, with "Palestine for the Arabs" in English and Arabic.

== Sixth congress: Jaffa, 1923 ==
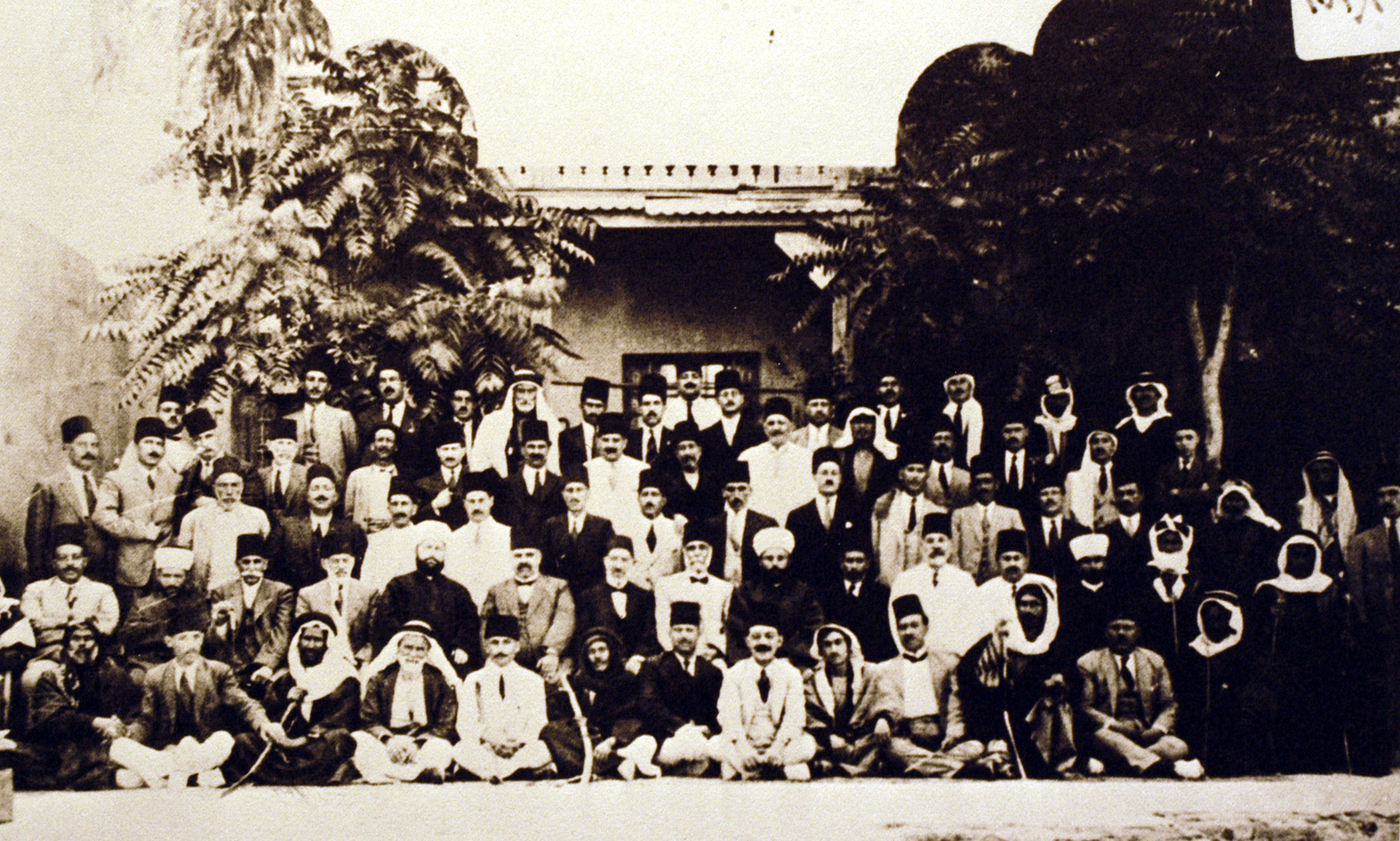
Sixth congress

Held from 16 to 20 June 1923, the congress was chaired by Musa Kazim. It was agreed to send another delegation to London, eschewing the more-radical policies which were advocated. A proposed campaign of non-payment of taxes, arguing no taxation without representation, was debated without a decision. Twenty-four resolutions were passed, including boycotts of Pinhas Rutenberg's Palestine Electricity Corporation and Jewish goods. In October, the more-radical National Party was formed in opposition to the Muslim-Christian Associations and the executive committee. The Congress passed a resolution supporting the Arab Orthodox Movement, and recognized the struggle between Arab Orthodox laity and the Greek-dominated Jerusalem Orthodox Patriarchate in broader nationalist terms.

== Seventh congress: Jerusalem, 1928 ==
Held on 20 June 1928, the congress formed a short-lived united front with Musa Kazim as president. A 48-member executive committee was elected, which selected an administrative staff consisting of a president, three secretaries and two other members. It was decided to send another delegation, the fourth, to London. It set out on 21 March 1930, after the publication of the Shaw Commission report on the 1929 riots.

== General Islamic Congress: Jerusalem, 1931 ==
A General Islamic Congress was held in Jerusalem in 1931. The delegates were not just Arabs. The World Islamic Congress was convened in Jerusalem in accordance with the charter of the organization of the World Islamic Congress in Mecca in 1926. More about the World Islamic Congress in Mecca (1926) see article World Islamic Congress and the note to the current article. As the influence of the Palestine Congress and its executive committee began to wane, other groups and leaders became active; in particular, the Supreme Muslim Council (and its president, Haj Amin al-Husseini) became involved in anti-Zionist activities. In 1931 Amin Husseini began organizing an international conference of Muslim delegates, political and religious, Sunni and Shia, from around the world to be held in Jerusalem. He obtained permission from retiring High Commissioner John Chancellor, on the condition that the conference did not discuss British policies. On 7 December 1931, 145 delegates from 22 Islamic countries assembled in Jerusalem. Delegates included Abdelaziz Thâalbi (Tunisia), Rida Tawfiq (Turkey), Muhammad Iqbal (India) and delegates from the Wafd (Egypt). Maulana Shaukat Ali (India) helped organize the event. The Indian delegates wanted the restoration of the Caliphate on the agenda, but al-Husseini maintained the focus on Muslim support for Palestinians. Zia'eddin Tabatabaee, former prime minister of Iran, developed plans for the establishment of an Islamic University in Jerusalem, and later traveled in 1933 to Iraq and India with al-Husseini to raise funds for the project.

The Congress lasted for two weeks, electing an executive committee and proposing the establishment of branches throughout the Muslim world. It affirmed the holiness of the Al-Aqsa mosque (including the Buraq wall) and the importance of Palestine to all Muslims, announcing plans for an Islamic university (the Aqsa Mosque University) and an Islamic land company to prevent Zionists from buying land in Palestine. The final session denounced Western imperialism in Muslim countries.

The conference may be seen as the end of the Palestine Arab Congress. It split the Palestinian national movement by excluding Christians, and was bitterly opposed by Amin al-Husseini's critics. Fakhri al-Nashashibi organized a rival event at the King David Hotel, calling it "The Conference of the Islamic Nation". None of the conference proposals came to fruition, although it consolidated Amin al-Husseini's position as a leader of the Palestinian anti-Zionist movement.

As the congress was ending, a group of about 50 delegates (primarily from Palestine and Syria) met at Awni Abdul Hadi's house and issued an Arab National Charter. This group (and the charter) evolved into the Istiqal Party.

== Aftermath ==
After the death of Musa Kazim on 27 March 1934, Christian executive vice-president Yaqoub Farraj became acting president. No agreement could be reached for a permanent successor, and no further Congresses were held. Its role was surpassed by a number of Palestinian Arab political parties representing the interests of particular families and individuals, or identifying with specific locations: the Istiqlal (1932), National Defence Party (1934), Arab Reform Party (1935), National Bloc Party (1935) and the Palestine Arab Party (1935). In 1932 a small group was formed in the Jaffa-Ramleh area, the Palestine Youth Party.

== Other Palestinian congresses, 1920–1930 ==
=== Arab Orthodox Congress: Haifa, 1923 ===
Arab members of the Greek Orthodox Church held a congress in Haifa on 15 July 1923. Many Palestinian members of the Greek Orthodox Church were active in anti-Zionism, particularly as editors and publishers of Falastin and Al-Karmil newspapers (Issa El-Issa and Najib Nassar respectively). The congress was convened after Patriarch Damianus I's sale of land to Zionists for 200,000 Egyptian pounds, a sale which rescued the patriarchate of Jerusalem from bankruptcy. A secondary issue was the patriarch's support for a British-proposed legislative assembly.

The Congress passed a resolution demanding that the patriarch should not speak on behalf of the community without the approval of a mixed council composed of two-thirds lay members and one-third clergy. Other resolutions called for the election of bishops by local councils, knowledge of Arabic by patriarchal representatives, control of church endowments by the Arab community and improvements in Orthodox education and welfare. A second Arab Orthodox conference was held in Jaffa on 28 October 1931.

=== Women's Congress ===
A Women's Congress, the First Arab Women's Congress or First Palestine Arab Women's Congress, attended by 200 women, was convened in 1929. Organisers (Arab Women's Executive Committee) included Wahida al-Khalidi (wife of Hussein al-Khalidi) and Amina al-Husayni (wife of Jamal al-Husayni). It was led by Salma al-Husayni, wife of Musa Kazim.

== Bibliography ==
- Robson, Laura (2011). Colonialism and Christianity in Mandate Palestine. University of Texas Press. ISBN 978-0-292-72653-6.
