= Hayim Margolis-Kalwariski =

Hayim Margolis-Kalwariski (various transliterations, also Chaim Margolis-Kalvarysky, or Haim Margalit Kalvarisky, and last names sometimes reversed Kalwariski-Margolis) (25 March 1868–19 January 1947) was an agronomist and Zionist thinker of the First Aliyah most well known for his contributions to reconciliation efforts between Jewish and Arab communities in Ottoman Palestine and then Mandatory Palestine.

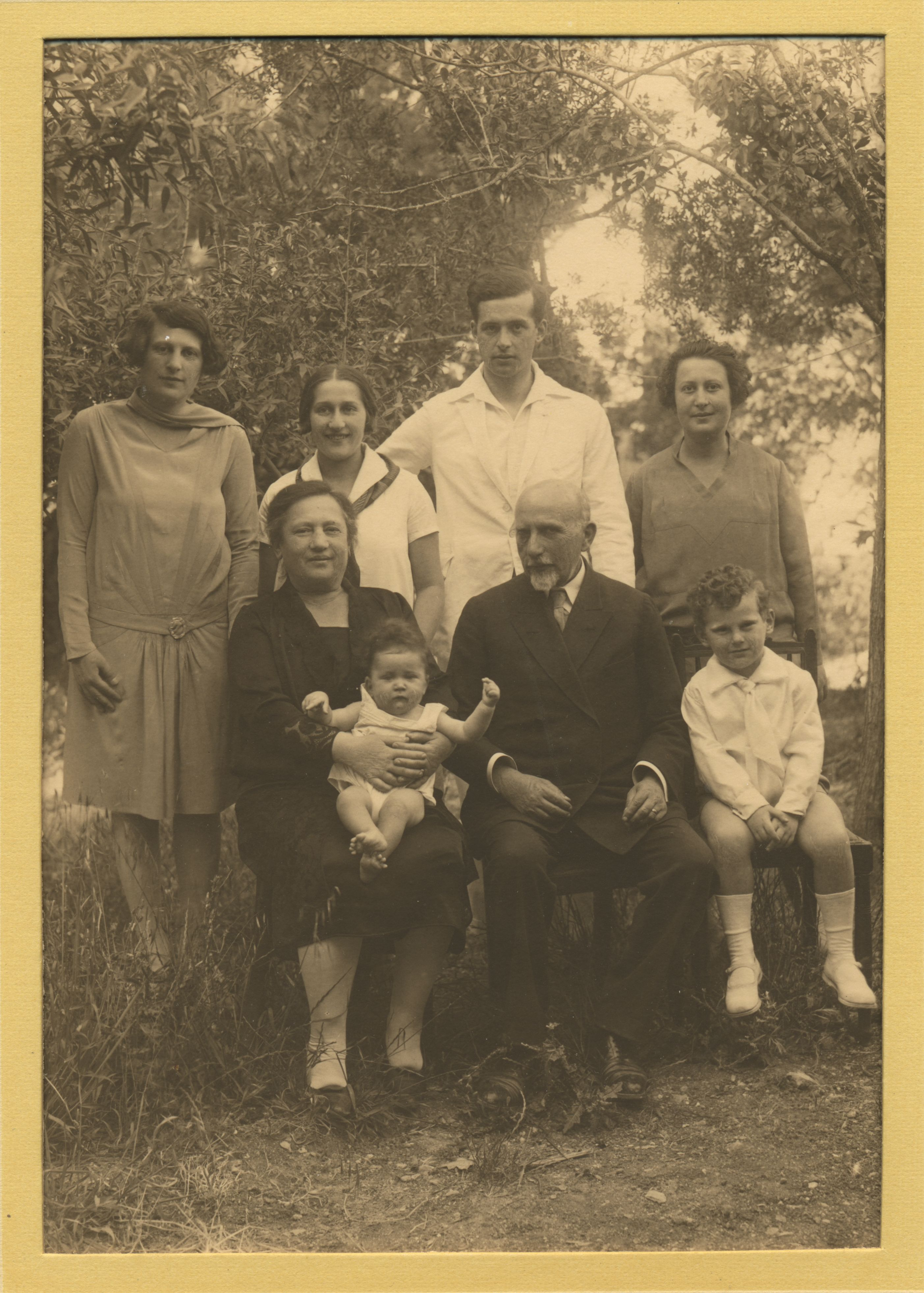
Hayim Margolis-Kalwariski and family, including his wife Esther at left. Jerusalem, early 1930s.

He is often remembered alongside such thinkers as Martin Buber, Judah Magnes, and Ahad Ha'am, each characterized by a "reconciliatory impulse" and "recognition of the plight of the indigenous population" in Palestine. "This same attitude also put this group at odds early on with the official Zionist framework."

The academic Cheryl Rubenberg describes Margolis-Kalwariski as "devoted to Jewish resettlement and Arab-Jewish friendship" and further claims that "his was the only Jewish home in which one encountered Arab intellectuals" during pre-state years of the Yishuv.

Rubenberg gives credit to Margolis-Kalwariski for the development of pre-WWI Jewish settlements in the Galilee and the organization Hashomer, as well as with convincing Baron Edmond de Rothschild to establish a Hebrew-Arab school near Rosh Pina. She notes that Margolis-Kalwariski became involved in Arab politics centered in Damascus as early as 1913 and that he was in contact with King Faysal.

== Career ==
During the Mandate period in Palestine, Margolis-Kalwariski served on the Arab-Jewish Advisory Council set up by Herbert Samuel and on the executive of the Va'ed Le'umi, the National Council of the Palestinian Jewish community. He also directed the Office of Arab Affairs of the Zionist Executive from 1923 to 1927 and was called upon for mediation efforts after the 1929 uprising.

He was a member of Brit Shalom, a small political group that called for a binational state in Palestine, as well as several organizations which succeeded it, including Kedma Mizraha (Forward to the East), the League of Arab-Jewish Rapprochement, and Ihud.
