= Musa al-Husayni =

Palestinian politician (1853–1934)

Musa Kazim Pasha al-Husayni
- موسى كاظم باشا الحسيني
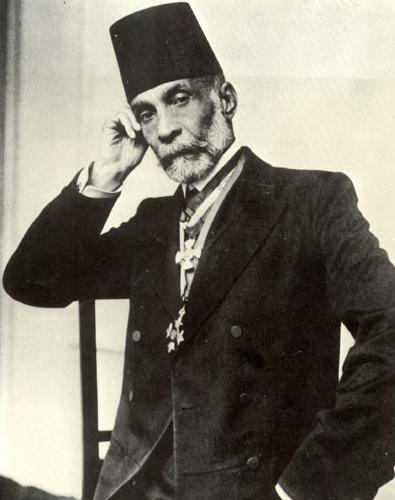
- Musa al-Husayni
- Born: 1853; Jerusalem, Ottoman Empire
- Died: 27 March 1934 (aged 80–81); Jerusalem, Mandatory Palestine
- Office: Mayor of Jerusalem
- Predecessor: Aref al-Dajani
- Successor: Raghib al-Nashashibi
- Children: Abdul Qadir al-Husayni
- Parent: Salim al-Husayni
- Relatives: Hussein al-Husayni (brother); Jamal al-Husayni (nephew; sister's son)

Musa Kazim Pasha al-Husayni (Arabic: موسى كاظم باشا الحسيني, Musa Kazem al-Ḥussaynī; 1853 – 27 March 1934) was a Palestinian politician and statesman. He belonged to the prominent al-Husayni family and was mayor of Jerusalem (1918–1920). He was dismissed as mayor by the British authorities and became head of the nationalist Executive Committee of the Palestine Arab Congress from 1922 until 1934. His death was believed to have been caused by injuries received during an anti-British demonstration.

== Early life and Ottoman political career ==
Born in Jerusalem, as a boy Musa Kazim was sent to Istanbul and attended the Maktab Malkiya (State School) and graduated third amongst students from all over the Ottoman Empire. His first posting was in the Department of Health, but he was quickly promoted in an exceptionally successful career and was given the title Pasha. He became Governor of a series of Ottoman municipalities and regions. These included Safed, Akkar, Irbid, Asir, Najd, Thalis, Hauran. His highest position was as Governor of the al-Muntafaq region of Iraq. His status can be judged by his purchase in 1872 of 1,000 acres of fertile land around Jericho, amounting to two thirds of the farm land in the area. In 1905 he was the governor (kaymakam) of Jaffa. His career was spanned by the reign of Sultan Abdul Hamid II at a time when the empire was being challenged by expanding European powers and it ended when he retired on the eve of World War I.

== Mandate career ==
In 1918 the British Military Governor of Jerusalem, Ronald Storrs, appointed Musa Kazem as mayor of the city. His brother, Hussein al-Husayni, had been mayor for eight years to 1918 and had died shortly after the surrender of the city to the British. Initially Musa Kazem's relationship with Storrs was good. He spoke English fluently and joined the Governor's pet project, Pro-Jerusalem Society, which was set up to raise the architectural standards of city buildings.

In November 1918 he led a public demonstration against British policy for the first time. It was to protest the jailing of two Arabs following disturbances during counter-demonstrations over Jewish celebrations of the anniversary of the Balfour Declaration.

A year and a half later at the climax of the Nabi Musa celebrations, Easter 1920, Musa Kazim addressed a large crowd from the balcony of the Arab Club beside the Jaffa Gate. The mood of his audience was nationalistic with chants of "Faisal is our king." In the anti-Zionist violence that followed 12 people were killed. The British set up courts-martial to punish those they believed responsible. Haj Amin al-Husseini and Arif al-Arif were sentenced in absentia to ten years hard labour. Khalil Baydas and Ze'ev Jabotinsky (for possession of firearms) were sentenced to fifteen years. Musa Kazim was briefly held in Acre prison.

Following the riots Storrs ordered Musa Kazim's dismissal as mayor. According to Storrs' own account he made sure he had Ragib Nashishibi's signed acceptance of the post before he fired Musa Kazim. Some account claim the mayor resigned in protest of the adoption of Hebrew as an official language.

At the 3rd Congress of the nationalist Palestine Arab Congress in Haifa, 14 December 1920 he was elected president and chairman of the Executive Committee which was to lead opposition to British policy in Palestine for the next ten years. The Executive Committee then met the new High Commissioner, Herbert Samuel, who refused to give them any official recognition unless they accepted British policy for a Jewish National Home.

The 4th Congress, May 1921, decided to send a delegation led by Musa Kazim to London. Prior to the Congress Musa Kazim had tried to present the views of the Executive Committee to the new British Colonial Secretary, Winston Churchill, first in Cairo and later in Jerusalem. The committee was rebuffed on both occasions. Prior to the departure of the delegation Musa Kazim issued a public condemnation of the Jaffa riots. The delegation held meetings with the Pope and with diplomats from the League of Nations in Geneva where they met Balfour who was non-committal. In London they held three meetings with Winston Churchill where they called for reconsideration of the Balfour Declaration, revocation of the Jewish National Home policy, an end to Jewish immigration and that Palestine should not be severed from its neighbours. All their demands were rejected, though they did receive encouragement from some Conservative Members of Parliament.

In 1922 Musa Kazim led a delegation to Ankara and then Lausanne where, following Mustafa Kemal Atatürk's victories against the Greek army in Turkey the Treaty of Sèvres was about to be re-negotiated. The Palestinian delegation hoped that with Atatürk's support they would be able to get the inclusion of the Balfour Declaration removed from the treaty. Despite statements of support from the Turkish officials the provisions for the French and British mandates remained unchanged in the final treaty.

The 6th Congress, June 1923, agreed to send another delegation to London, as well as a third one a year later. Despite being unable to achieve anything, on their return in August 1925, Musa Kazim managed to persuade the delegates to the 5th Congress to be restrained in their campaign against British policy, arguing that results could still be achieved through diplomacy.

At the 1928 Congress he was once again elected president and in an attempt to create a united front worked closely with Ragib Nashashibi.

In March 1930 he led a fourth delegation to London. Other members of this delegation were Haj Amin Husseini, Ragib Nashashibi and Alfred Roch (ar) a Catholic businessman from Jaffa. They returned disillusioned and in 1931 he led a fresh anti-Zionist campaign.

In February 1933 the Arab Executive held meetings with the Istiqlal (Independence) Party and the Youth Congress at which Musa Kazim faced criticism for the Executive's inaction. He managed to deflect calls for a campaign of civil disobedience and a boycott of British goods. Instead he led a delegation to meet High Commissioner, Wauchope, calling for the end of land sales to Jews and the end of Jewish immigration. These demands having been rejected a mass meeting was held in Jaffa, 26 March, attended by 5–600 people to discuss a policy of non-cooperation.

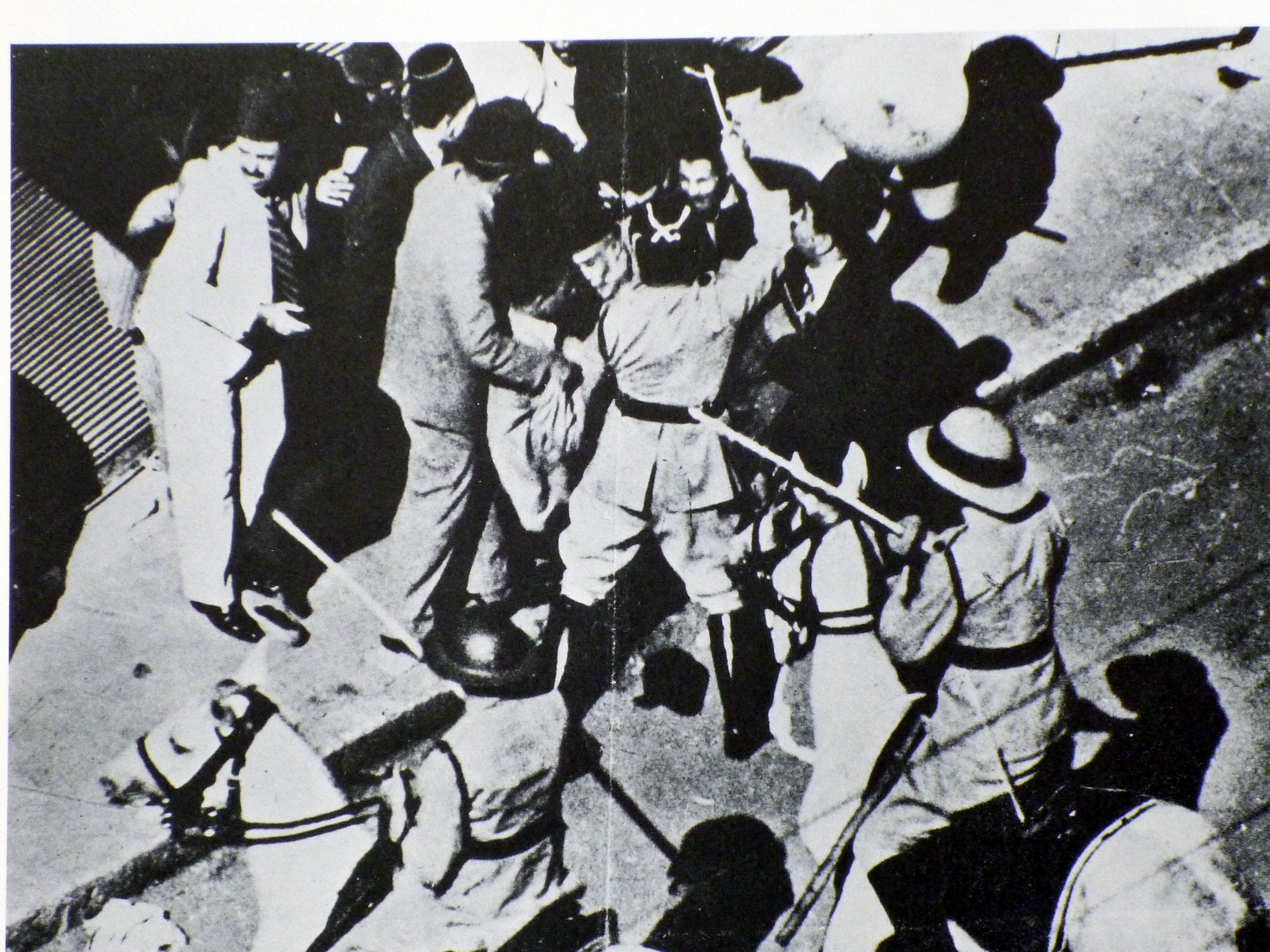
Musa Kazim being clubbed by a British Policeman, Jaffa, 27 October 1933.

During October 1933 there were anti-immigration demonstrations in Jerusalem, Jaffa, Haifa and Nablus which left 30 people dead, including one policeman, and more than 200 injured. On 27 October Musa Kazim led a demonstration in Jaffa which was violently broken up by British police. Musa Kazim was beaten to the ground and the injuries he received were believed to have led to his death, aged 81, on 27 March 1934. His funeral in Jerusalem was attended by large crowds.

It is suggested that public outrage at Musa Kazim's death was the reason that Ragib Nashishibi was not re-elected Mayor of Jerusalem that year.

== Interaction with Jews and Zionists ==
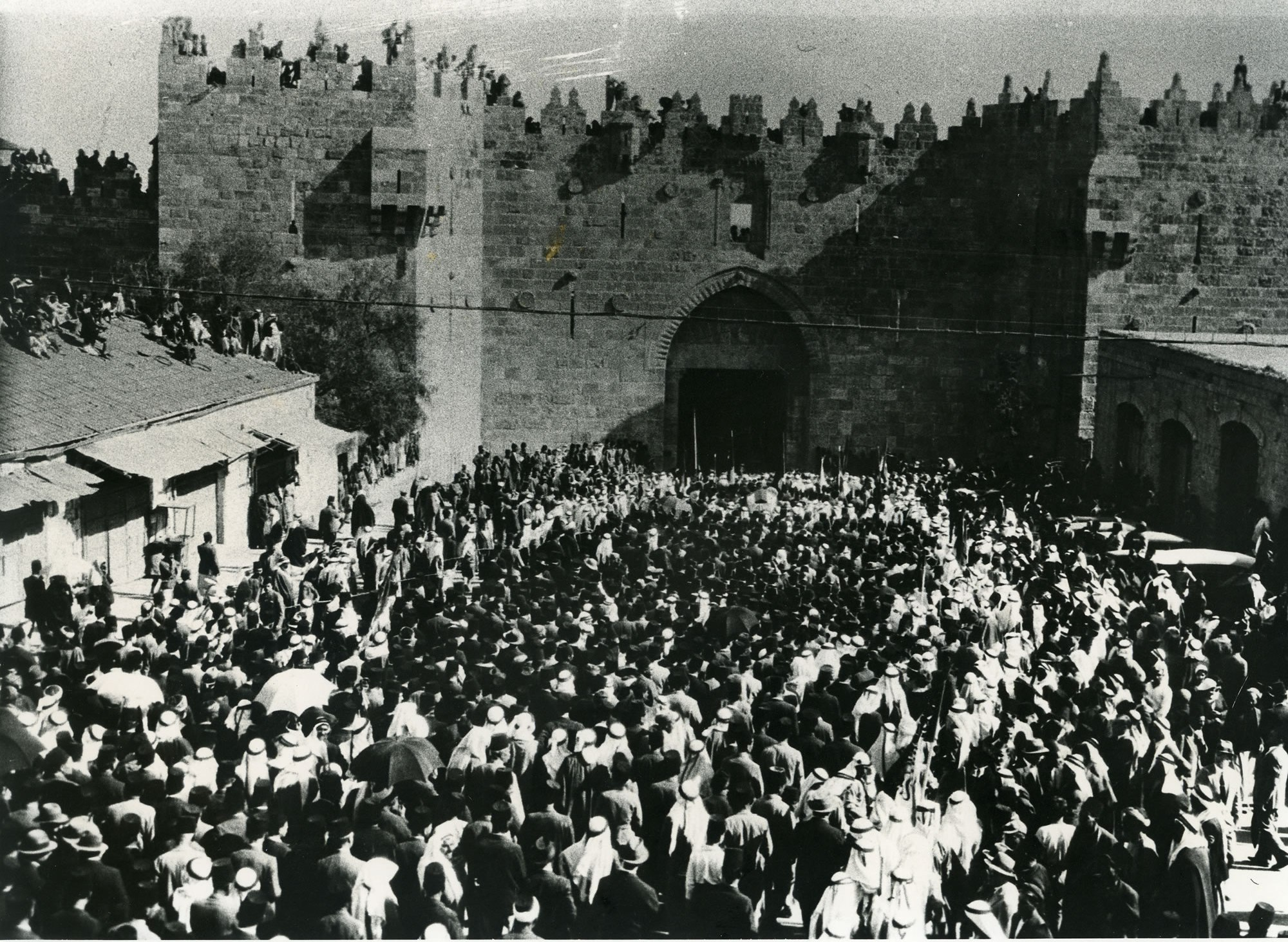
Musa al-Husayni's Funeral, Damascus Gate, Jerusalem, 17 March 1934, photography by Khalil Raad

In 1905, while Governor of Jaffa, Husayni sent armed guards to protect the new Jewish neighbourhood of Neve Tzedek, north of Jaffa, founded by his personal friend Eliezer Rokach. He also helped associates of Edmond Rothschild in the setting up of some of the first Jewish colonies.

Musa Kazim, as Mayor of Jerusalem, attended a reception organised by Storrs for the Zionist Commission led by Chaim Weizmann, 27 April 1918. But he refused to meet Weizmann in person, and also refused to meet him later in London.

In December 1918 he had a confrontation with Menachem Ussishkin head of the Zionist Executive over the use of Hebrew in the official invitation to the celebrations for the anniversary of the British conquest of Jerusalem. He argued that most of the Jews in Jerusalem understood Arabic, most did not understand Hebrew and that this was just an attempt to force the municipality to give in to Zionist demands.

He did have a close relationship with Chaim Kalvarisky of the Zionist Executive. Notes made by Kalvarisky in 1923 appear to show Musa Kazim complaining that he had not received money that had been promised to him. This may refer to money that Frederick Kisch had agreed to give to several leading Arab figures in return for supporting British policies. The amount mentioned in Kisch's diary was £400 per month.

Despite his criticism of Jewish land purchase in Palestine, Husayni himself sold land to Jews. In the 1920s, he appears to have sold land to the Jewish National Fund in particular at Dalab, near Abu Gosh on which kibbutz Kiryat Anavim was later built. His name also appears on a 1937 Zionist list of notables who had sold land.

== Personal life ==
He was the father of Abd al-Qadir al-Husayni, Sami al Husayni, Farid al Husayni, Rafiq al-Husayni and Fouad al Husayni.

He was buried in the Al-Khatuniyya Madrasa (where his son Abd al-Qadir and his grandson Faisal Husseini would also be buried) by the al-Aqsa Compound.

== See also ==
- Orient House
- Pro-Jerusalem Society (1918–1926) – Musa al-Husayni, as former mayor, was a member of its leading council
