= List of people from Nablus =

The following list includes notable people from the city of Nablus.

== Modern era ==
- Yoseph ben Ab-Hisda ben Yaacov ben Aaharon (1919–1998), former Samaritan high priest
- Salwa Al Bana (born 1951), author
- Awni Abd al-Hadi (1889–1970), 20th century Palestinian politician.
- Rabab Abdulhadi (born 1955), Palestinian-born American scholar, activist, educator, editor, and an academic director.
- Mamdouh Al Aker (born 1943), physician
- Hani Awijan (1977–2016), former head of the Palestinian Islamic Jihad militant group in Nablus.
- Nasib al-Bitar (1890–1948), former Islamic court judge.
- Izzat Darwaza (1888–1984), Palestinian Arab nationalist leader in early 20th century.
- Aziz Dweik (born 1948), Speaker of the Palestinian Legislative Council.
- Mohamed Ali Eltaher (1896–1974), Palestinian journalist and newspaper editor.
- Fadi Kafisha (1977–2006), former head of Tanzim militant group in Nablus.
- Sahar Khalifeh (born 1941), Palestinian writer.
- Munib Masri (born 1934), Palestinian billionaire.
- Ahmed Sheikh (born 1949), editor-in-chief of Al-Jazeera.
- Ahmad Toukan (1903–1981), Prime Minister and educator.
- Fadwa Touqan (1917–2003), Palestinian poet.
- Fawwaz Tuqan (born 1940), writer, professor and former minister.
- Ibrahim Touqan (1905–1941), Palestinian poet.
- Abdel Wael Zwaiter (1934–1972), translator.

== Pre-modern period ==
- Ibn al-Sal'us (died 1294), a 13th-century merchant and Mamluk vizier
- Justin Martyr (c. AD 100 – c. AD 165), second century Christian apologist
- Muhammad ibn Ahmad al-Nabulusi - anti-Fatimid rebel who moved to Baniyas to continue his agitation against the Fatimid Caliphate
