= Mu'in al-Madi =

Palestinian politician

- Portrait of Mu'in al-Madi

Personal details
- Born: Unknown Ijzim, Ottoman Palestine
- Died: 1957 Damascus, Syria
- Party: al-Istiqlal
- Occupation: Head of Acre Municipality (1914) al-Istiqlal Leadership Committee member (1932-48); Arab Higher Committee member (1936-37; 1947)
- Committees: Arab Higher Committee

Mu'in al-Madi (Arabic: معين الماضي) (died 1957) was a Palestinian Arab politician and member of the Arab Higher Committee. He was one of the founders of the al-Istiqlal (Independence) party, which espoused Arab nationalism. Al-Madi helped organize the 1936–39 Arab revolt in Palestine.

== Early life and background ==
Mu'in was born to the large landowning Palestinian Arab family, al-Madi, in the town of Ijzim west of the Jezreel Valley. The al-Madi family rose to prominence in the first half of the 19th century under Sheikh Mas'ud al-Madi, originating from Ijzim where they owned considerable amounts of land. They expanded their holdings to the city of Haifa and dominated swathes of territory along the Mediterranean coast of Palestine, stretching from Jaffa to villages north of Haifa. Mu'in's father, Abdullah al-Madi, was a member of Haifa's municipal council from 1902–05 and 1912.

Mu'in received his primary education at the government-run al-Rushdiyya School in Haifa, finishing in 1908. He later enrolled in the al-Mulkiyya School (Royal College) in Istanbul where he learned the Turkish language. After graduating in 1912, he began his career as an Ottoman clerk in the town of Kashmuna in Anatolia.

== Political career ==
=== Municipalities of Acre and Baysan ===
In 1914, al-Madi was elected head of Acre's municipality and then leader of Baysan. On August 1, 1915, upon suspicion of helping Arab nationalists, he was transferred to Beirut (the Ottoman governor there, Jamal Pasha, had already hanged a number of Arab nationalists in the city) to serve as governmental employee. Following this demotion, he was tried by a military tribunal on charges of "conspiracy against the Ottoman state," but the charges were acquitted when his father interfered on his behalf. Al-Madi's demotion and trial left him embittered with the Ottoman authorities and after his release, he took up an alias and hid in the house of an Arab Christian, Najib al-Hakim, in Damascus.

=== Arab nationalism ===
From 1918, al-Madi was among the focal members of an emerging group of Arab nationalists based in Haifa and linked to the pan-Arab movement of Syria which also included Rashid al-Haj Ibrahim, a prominent businessman and local Haifan leader. He had previously joined the nationalist underground organization, al-Fatat. Initially, al-Madi's activities centered on the Hashemites, who led the Arab Revolt against the Ottoman Turks in 1917. He served under the short-lived Damascus-based government of King Faisal ibn al-Hussein, a Hashemite, in 1920. During this period, he was appointed governor of al-Karak in Transjordan, as well as the Director of Intelligence.

After the dissolution of the pan-Arab government in May 1921, al-Madi returned to Ijzim. His background in addition to his education, allowed him to take controversial stands without affecting his position as an Arab nationalist. He was one of the few members in this movement to make compromises with the question of establishing an Arab Legislative Council. By 1924, he began to gain influence in Ijzim and formed a base of support in Haifa. He and Najib al-Hakim joined and offered their services without charge to the Haifa branch of the Palestine Arab Workers Society (PAWS) upon its founding in 1925, in order to counter the influence of the Jewish labor organization, Histadrut.

=== Independence Party of Palestine ===
On August 2, 1932, al-Madi became one of nine Palestinians who founded the al-Istiqlal (Independence) party which espoused pan-Arabism, independence from Great Britain, and the assertion of the Palestinian Arab identity within the region of Syria. He was one of the organizers of the 1933 anti-British demonstrations in Jaffa.

He was later appointed to the Arab Higher Committee (AHC), established in early 1936 by the Grand Mufti of Jerusalem, Mohammad Amin al-Husayni. In June, he was dispatched to Baghdad where he was "enthusiastically" received. He successfully managed to convince Yasin al-Hashimi, the Prime Minister of Iraq, to release Fawzi al-Qawuqji from the army to lead an Arab volunteer army against the British in Palestine. He was again sent to Iraq (with Izzat Darwaza and al-Haj Ibrahim) in January 1937, as well as to Riyadh, to garner support for the Arab revolt in Palestine that was initiated the year prior. He was exiled with most of the Palestinian Arab leadership and was one of the first leaders to meet with al-Husayni in Lebanon to discuss a new Arab strategy. In January 1938, the French Mandate authorities had al-Madi banished to Alexandretta in northern Syria.

== Later life ==
Al-Madi received amnesty in 1946. The re-established AHC again appointed him a member in January 1947. He could not attend the London Conference that year due to an illness and was temporarily replaced by Sami Taha. Because of al-Husayni's unwillingness to include wider representation in the AHC, al-Madi resigned in mid-1947. After the 1948 Arab-Israeli War, al-Madi fled his native village for Damascus where he died in 1957.

== Bibliography ==
- Khalaf, Issa (1991). Politics in Palestine: Arab factionalism and social disintegration, 1939-1948. SUNY Press. ISBN 978-0-7914-0708-0.
- Matthew, Weldon C. (2006). Confronting an empire, constructing a nation: Arab nationalists and popular politics in mandate Palestine. I.B. Tauris. ISBN 9781845111731.
- Muslih, Muhammad Y. (1989). The Origins of Palestinian Nationalism. Columbia University Press. p. 146. ISBN 978-0-231-06509-2. "Izzat Darwaza."
- Nafi, B. M. (1998). Arabism, Islamism and the Palestine question, 1908-1941: a political history. Garnet and Ithaca Press. ISBN 0-86372-235-0.
- Yazbak, M (1998). Haifa in the late Ottoman period, 1864-1914: Muslim town in transition Volume 16 of The Ottoman Empire and its heritage. BRILL. ISBN 90-04-11051-8.
- Sekaily, May (2002). Haifa: Transformation of an Arab Society 1918-1939. I.B.Tauris. ISBN 1-86064-556-9.
