= Izzat Darwaza =

Palestinian politician and historian (1888–1984)

- محمد عزة دروزة
- Portrait of Darwaza

Secretary-General of Istiqlal
- In office 1932–1947

General Administrator of the Waqf
- In office 1930–1937

Personal details
- Born: 1888 Nablus, Ottoman Empire
- Died: July 26, 1984 (aged 95–96) Damascus, Syria
- Party: Istiqlal
- Other political affiliations: al-Fatat
- Occupation: Arab nationalist political activist
- Profession: Historian, Editor, Educator, Muslim scholar
- Committees: Supreme Muslim Council and Arab Higher Committee

Muhammad 'Izzat Darwaza (Arabic: محمد عزة دروزة; 1888–1984) was a Palestinian politician, historian, and educator from Nablus. Early in his career, he worked as an Ottoman bureaucrat in Palestine and Lebanon. Darwaza had long been a sympathizer of Arab nationalism and became an activist of that cause following the Arab Revolt against the Ottoman Empire in 1916, joining the nationalist al-Fatat society. As such, he campaigned for the union of Greater Syria (modern-day Levant) and vehemently opposed Zionism and foreign mandates in Arab lands. From 1922 to 1927, he served as an educator and as the principal at the an-Najah National School where he implemented a pro-Arab nationalist educational system, promoting the ideas of Arab independence and unity. Darwaza's particular brand of Arab nationalism was influenced by Islam and his beliefs in Arab unity and the oneness of Arabic culture.

Later, Darwaza co-founded the nationalist Istiqlal party in Palestine and was a principal organizer of anti-British demonstrations. In 1937, he was exiled to Damascus as a result of his activities and from there he helped support the Arab revolt in the Mandatory Palestine. He was incarcerated in Damascus by French authorities for his involvement in the revolt, and while in prison he began to study the Qur'an and its interpretations. In 1945, after he was released, Darwaza eventually compiled his own interpretation entitled al-Tafsir al-Hadith.

In 1946, he joined the Arab Higher Committee led by Haj Amin al-Husseini, but resigned the next year after being disenfranchised by al-Husayni's methods. He left for Syria afterward and briefly aided in the unity talks between Syria and Egypt in the mid-1950s. By the time of his death in 1984, Darwaza had written over thirty books and published numerous articles on the Palestinian question, Arab history, and Islam.

== Biography ==
=== Early life and background ===
Darwaza was born to a middle-class Sunni Muslim mercantile family in Nablus. The Darwaza family had long been involved in textiles and had extensive trade relationships with merchants in Beirut and Damascus. In his memoirs, Izzat writes "The import of [textile] goods from the outside was, for the most part, through Beirut and Damascus." Izzat's father, 'Abd al-Hadi Darwaza and his paternal grandfather Darwish Darwaza, owned a store in the Khan al-Tujjar of Nablus. Izzat recalled, "From what I remember from my father and through my grandfather, the title merchant or merchants in Nablus mostly referred to owners of commercial textile and cloth shops. In Nablus, these shops were confined, or mostly confined, to a caravansary called Khan al-Tujjar, in the middle of Nablus."

Izzat received elementary and preparatory education in Ottoman government-run schools in the city. In addition to Arabic, he learned Turkish and English, as well as a basic knowledge of French which he strengthened in by the end of his formal education. Darwaza left school without going to Istanbul or Beirut to finish his education as was the custom of his generation. Instead, he educated himself, and according to Rashid Khalidi, became "a self-taught intellectual."

=== Loyalty to dissidence toward the Ottoman Empire ===
Originally, Darwaza supported the Ottoman Empire based on his feelings of identification with Islam and of belonging to the larger Ottoman Muslim ummah ("nation"). In 1906, he served in the local Ottoman administration as a clerk in the Department of Telegraphic and Postal Services (DTPS) in Nablus. His first assignment in that department was for the District of Beisan and northern Palestine (the Galilee and northern Samaria). He was also an Arabist and was enthusiastic about the Young Turk Revolution in 1908, expecting that the new Ottoman government would institute reforms and grant the Arabs autonomy within the framework of the empire.

His loyalty to the Ottomans eroded, however, due to the impact of the new governments's Turkification policies which he viewed as repressive against his ideals. Because of his dissatisfaction with the Young Turks, Darwaza was driven to support Arab independence from the empire. In 1908, he joined the Committee of Union and Progress (CUP), but withdrew soon after because of its Turkish nationalist political agenda. He played an active role in establishing a branch for the Party of Harmony and Freedom in Nablus in 1911. The party was founded in Istanbul and joined by Arab members to counter the policies of the CUP. In 1913, he joined an anti-Zionist group based in Nablus that sought to prevent the sale of Arab-owned land to Jews by submitting petitions to the Ottoman sultan, or by buying land for sale to preempt its purchase by Jews. In June 1913, he helped to prepare and became secretary of the First Palestinian Congress (also known as the Arab Congress of 1913) in Paris. In congress, he was also the delegate for the Jamma'in subdistrict of the District of Nablus. Meanwhile, Darwaza was still working in the DTPS.

In 1914, he established the Arab Scientific Society whose purpose was to spread Arabic culture in the region through the establishment of Arabic schools. The society did not succeed, however, due to the outbreak of World War I. Within the DTPS, Darwaza was appointed commissioner and deputy for the Nablus Post Office. He was promoted again—this time as director of postal stamp sales in Beirut.

=== Promoting unity with Syria ===
During World War I, Darwaza served as Postal Directorate-General of Beirut and retained this post until 1918. In 1916, while serving with the Ottoman army in the Sinai Peninsula, he joined the underground al-Fatat organization through Ahmad Qadri, a high-ranking member from Damascus. The aim of al-Fatat was to liberate and unite the Arab lands under Ottoman rule. In the wake of the Arab Revolt of 1916, Darwaza left the Ottoman civil service to serve in King Faisal's provisional government in Damascus. Ideologically, Darwaza became an Arab nationalist endorsing the concept of a Greater Syrian Arab state.

Following the World War I Armistice, Darwaza held several political posts including Secretary-General of al-Fatat from May 1919 to March 1920, Secretary of the Muslim-Christian Association's Nablus branch, and Secretary of the First Palestine Arab Congress in Jerusalem in 1919. During the spring and summer of 1919, a vigorous political campaign was waged by the Arab politicians in Palestine who were divided into "Younger Politicians" and "Older Politicians". The campaign was centered on the political future of Palestine, and Darwaza, a Younger Politician, played a central role. The Younger Politicians consisted of Arab nationalists who sought to unite Palestine with King Faisal's Syria while the Older Politicians consisted of Palestinian nationalists who preferred that Palestine be an independent entity.

Darwaza and Hafiz Kanaan—another leading al-Fatat member from Nablus—lobbied Arab groups in Jerusalem to advocate Syro-Palestinian unity before the arrival of the King-Crane Commission on 10 June 1919. They first met with Haj Amin al-Husseini and Kamil al-Husayni of al-Nadi al-Arabi party and they immediately expressed their support. They also suggested that Darwaza meet Raghib al-Nashashibi, Hussam ad-Din Jarallah, and Aref al-Dajani, supporters of independence. Darwaza convinced Nashashibi to gather some of the Older Politicians of Jerusalem to a meeting at his house. When it was made clear that Musa al-Husayni, a leader of the Older Politicians, was now in favor of unity, all of the other Older Politicians followed suit. When the commission arrived in Jaffa, it concluded on 27 June that it was in favor of Syro-Palestinian unity under a British Mandate.

In the first week of July 1919, the General Syrian Congress (GSC) held its first meeting in Damascus and Darwaza was its secretary. The GSC called for the immediate independence of Syria as a sovereign state under a constitutional monarchy and underlined its opposition to the establishment of Zionism in southern Syria (Palestine). Along with Haj Amin al-Husseini and Aref al-Aref, Darwaza founded and became an officer of the Palestinian Society in Damascus. The organization urged all societies and clubs in Palestine to cooperate and condemn the San Remo Conference's decision to grant Great Britain a mandate over Palestine and Transjordan.

The hope of Darwaza and the Younger Politicians for unity with Syria were curtailed when it became known that King Faisal was aligning himself with the leaders of the Zionist movement because "they [the Zionists] were helping us [the Arabs] in the [Paris Peace] conference." Afterward, Darwaza believed King Faisal did not devote to the Palestine issue its deserved attention. Faisal was deposed by the French in July 1920. An event that further deteriorated Darwaza's ambitions of Arab unity was the confirmation of the British Mandate over Palestine at the San Remo Conference on 24 April 1920. His experience in Damascus revealed to him that the universalism of Arab nationalism was not as concrete as its advocates had thought, and the military might of the European powers—France and Great Britain—were an overwhelming force to contend with.

=== Educator in Nablus ===
Darwaza continued his political activity, representing Nablus in the Fourth Palestinian Congress in May 1921 and the Seventh Palestinian Congress in June 1928. From 1922 to 1927, he served as the principal of the an-Najah National School (later to become an-Najah National University) where he initiated and nurtured an Arab nationalist political educational process. Darwaza wrote textbooks and was an educator himself. One of his students who later became a nationalist politician, Akram Zu'aiter, wrote that Darwaza "used to give us a weekly lesson on the principles of Nationalism and [modern] society, in a way which sharpened our thought and broadened our horizons." Zuaiter also recalls that Darwaza wrote up nationalist and historical plays that his students would perform in.

In 1927, Rashid al-Haj Ibrahim, the leader of the Young Men's Muslim Association of Haifa, a prominent merchant, and future associate of Darwaza, invited him to his home to speak to a large group of students and notables about nationalist (qawmiyya) and patriotic (wataniyya) education. This was recognition that Darwaza's contribution to the spread of Arab nationalist sentiments gained influence not only in an-Najah School, but throughout Palestine.

=== Fight against the British Mandate ===
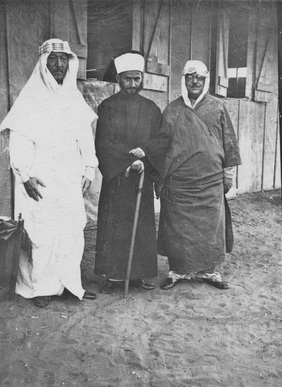
Darwaza (right) and Awni Abd al-Hadi (left) during their internment in the British military camp of Sarafand al-Amar, 1936

Darwaza became a member of the Arab Executive Committee and in 1930 was appointed by rival nationalist Haj Amin al-Husseini (then the Grand Mufti of Jerusalem) as the General Administrator of the Waqf (Islamic religious trust) under the Supreme Muslim Council. In 1931, he convinced his city's MCA to change its name to the Patriotic Arab Association. Unlike other Arab politicians at the time, Darwaza supported a combination of pan-Arabism, Islamism, and dedication to the Palestinian nationalist ideal.

He began to edit in the al-Ja'miyya al-Arabiyya newspaper in the early 1930s and in December 1931-January 1932, he wrote articles encouraging Arabs to protest against British policies in the Middle East, to unite in the face of growing dangers, and to renew their drive towards freedom and independence. In August 1932, he along with Awni Abd al-Hadi and others founded the Istiqlal (Independence) party in Palestine, an offshoot of al-Fatat. Originally, the Istiqlal operated in Syria, then Transjordan, but reassembled in Palestine after facing disappointing circumstances in both those territories. The party coaxed Palestinians towards defying British rule by staging demonstrations and political and social boycotts. Darwaza refused to allow the Istiqlal to participate in meetings between local Palestinian political parties and the British high-commissioner. Darwaza wrote an article on 21 June 1933, vehemently attacking Palestinian "vested interests". He argued that the wealthy Arab notables of Palestine were subservient to the British and the Zionists and would willingly leave Palestine for other countries, while the poor and middle-class Arabs were forced by economic circumstances to remain in Palestine during their political struggles. Darwaza helped instigate and organize the 1933 demonstrations in Jaffa which protested British policies in Palestine and continued allowances of Jewish immigration.

Darwaza was one of the principal organizers of the 1936–39 Arab revolt in Palestine which first erupted in his hometown of Nablus with the launch of the Palestinian general strike. Along with Abd al-Hadi, Darwaza was arrested by the British authorities in June and imprisoned in the military camp at Sarafand al-Amar. The Mufti sent a delegation consisting of Darwaza, Mu'in al-Madi, and Abd al-Hadi to Baghdad, then to Riyadh to discuss the situation and upon their return on 6 January 1937, they revealed that the advice given to them was to cease hostilities. During the revolt, in 1937, Darwaza was exiled from Palestine by British authorities to Damascus. Later in that year, Darwaza held several meetings with Nuri al-Sa'id of Iraq to explore various solutions to help the Arabs avoid appearing intransigent.

Despite attempts to calm the situation, in Damascus, Darwaza established and headed the Central Committee for National Jihad in Palestine which echoed Izz al-Din al-Qassam's call for a "holy war" against the British and Zionism. Darwaza had many encounters with al-Qassam, describing him as "a man lacking in arrogance or self-love. He was open and available to all of the people and the people loved him. And he lived the life of a mujahid." Darwaza worked closely with the Mufti, who was now under house arrest in Beirut, to garner support and supplies for the revolt and supervise the Arab rebels in Palestine.

In late 1939, he was accused by French military authorities of helping Palestinian rebels in the revolt, tried by a military court, and sentenced to five years imprisonment in the Citadel of Damascus. While his exile by the British abruptly curtailed his political life, his imprisonment marked the beginning of a new life wherein the Quran becomes a major concern for the next several years. He was released in November 1944. After his release, Darwaza was unable to return to Nablus because British authorities had issued an order preventing him from entering Palestine. As a result, he left for Turkey, mostly staying in Bursa until the end of 1945.

The Mufti re-established the Arab Higher Committee (AHC) in late 1946 and Darwaza joined the ten-member council upon a request from the Mufti. Darwaza, along with Emil Ghuri and Mu'in al-Madi, served as the AHC's delegates to the September 1947 convention of the Arab League's Political Committee in Lebanon. With support from the Transjordanian representative, Salih Jaber, the Prime Minister of Iraq, openly criticized the delegates and questioned the AHC's right to even send delegates to the convention. Later that year, Darwaza resigned from the AHC due to the Mufti's unbending attitude towards wider representation.

=== Later life ===
After resigning from the AHC, Darwaza spent the rest of his life in the modern state of Syria where he left politics to concentrate on literature. Although he did much of his writing in the 1930s and 1940s, he did not have any of his works published until the 1960s. As a pan-Arab intellectual, Darwaza aided in establishing the union between Syria and Egypt forming the short-lived United Arab Republic. After Egypt adopted its 1956 constitution declaring that it was an Arab country and its people a part of the Arab nation, Darwaza concluded that Egypt and Syria were in a position to unite. When unity negotiations underwent, he suggested several forms of federation, such as the American, Soviet, and Indian models, but did not recommend any specific model for an Arab state. Darwaza did, however, suggest that the institution of a federation between Egypt and Syria would be the first step towards the realization of a comprehensive union.

In 1983 Darwaza granted Palestinian historian Muhammad Y. Muslih an eight-day interview and allowed him to photo-copy his memoirs in entirety. Muslih noted that Darwaza was failing in health at the time. He died in Damascus in 1984 at the age of 96. Darwaza had three daughters, Najah, Salma, and Rudaina and a son, Zuhair.

== Literary works ==
Darwaza in traditional Arab robe

One of the first modern histories of the Arab nation in contrast to a history of an individual Arab country was composed by Darwaza in the late 1920s under the title Lessons of Arab History: From Antiquity to Present Times. In the book, Darwaza begins by describing the origins of the Semitic peoples, the rise of Islam, the end of Arab rule in the Middle East by Turkic groups, and the foreign rule over the Arabs by Western powers. The book was intended to be used as a textbook in primary and secondary schools throughout the British Mandates of Palestine and later Iraq, hence its simplified and direct language. Nonetheless, it played a pioneering role in the development of pan-Arabism.

In 1934, Darwaza published a widely read story, The Angel and the Land Broker, reflecting popular Arab sentiments against the growing "Zionist threat" and attacking brokers who tempted Palestinian land owners to sell their land to Jews. The story describes methods used by Zionists to entice Arab landowners to sell their land and the main characters in the story are an illiterate farmer and a Jewish girl from Tel Aviv who encourages the former to spend himself deep into debt, forcing him to sell his land at a price far below its value.

Later in his lifetime after leaving politics, Darwaza published memoirs that discussed in detail the city of Nablus in the late 19th and early 20th centuries. According to Youssef Choueiri, "he gives a graphic and almost exhaustive description of his hometown... its mosques, residential quarters, orchards, industries, and inhabitants. Moreover, he dwells at length of the social composition of the town endeavoring to reveal the open conflict between 'feudal families' and the new generation of middle traders, functionaries, civil servants, and teachers."

=== Quranic studies and interpretations ===
While he was imprisoned in Damascus, Darwaza was provided with an opportunity to read and reflect upon the Quran. He states "I considered [this opportunity] an act of divine [favor] and started reading whatever books of exegesis and qur'anic studies were accessible to me." During his incarceration, he compiled three books dealing with the Quran and conceived the idea of writing a modern tafsir ("interpretation").

His time in Turkey exposed him to the libraries of Bursa and it was there where he wrote the rough draft of his tafsir entitled al-Tafsir al-Hadith. Darwaza states in this exegesis he would "uncover the wisdom of revelation, the fundamental concepts of the Qur'an and the whole range of its subject matter and present it in a new style and new sequential order." Al-Tafsir al-Hadith was generally aimed at the Muslim youth who had been alienated by the traditional interpretations of the Quran. Darwaza placed much emphasis on the close relationship between the text of the Quran and the environment in which it was revealed. He rejected the hadith which states the Qur'an was originally preserved on a tablet in the seventh heaven, sent down to lowest heaven and from there gradually to Muhammad.

After the completion of the rough draft, he wrote a volume of four chapters, Qur'an al-Majid, which served as an introduction for the tafsir. Darwaza stresses a close connection between the Quran and the biography of the Muhammad (sira) and states that the Quran fully reflects various stages between the Quran and the career of Muhammad. He also emphasizes that both the angels and the jinn are spoken in the Quran not for their own sake, but to reinforce Muhammad's missions and goals.

He contends that the presentation of the Quran and its suras was dictated by Muhammad and that the task of Abu Bakr was to collect the Quran between its two covers and transcribe it into one copy, while Uthman's task was to fix the transcription and unify it to prevent variant readings. He also expresses doubts that Ali, as it is alleged, had made a chronologically arranged collection. Darwaza was very critical of other modern interpreters who used certain verses of the Quran to deduce and support scientific theories. He argues that those people have done harm to Islam by trivializing the sacred character of the Quran.

Darwaza was convinced that interpretations of the Quran were the only possible basis for any renewal and development of Islamic religious, political and social thought, and that the Quran was the only resource for Muslim reinterpretation of traditional norms in Islam and Islamic thinking. Since it was quite uncommon to follow a chronological order for a whole tafsir—which Darwaza did—he had to justify his position by seeking a fatwa from the muftis of Aleppo and Damascus.

== Legacy ==
Throughout his life, Darwaza was an Arab nationalist and supported the unity of Syria and Palestine. His particular brand of Arab nationalism was influenced by Islam, his belief in Arab unity, and the oneness of Arabic culture. According to his perspective, the ideology's main points were the Arabic language, the Arab homeland, a shared Arab history and common Arab interests. Although Darwaza believed that Arab nationalism pre-dated Islam, he also maintained that Islam expanded Arab territory and "stamped them with the eternal mark of Arab nationalism." According to Muhammad Y. Muslih, this meant that Islam had provided Arabs with "spiritual, cultural, and legal unity and within the framework of that unity the Arab individual formed his moral and social beliefs, irrespective of where he lived and through it the Arabs were able to preserve national identity and maintain their culture in the face of foreign invaders, including the Ottomans". Darwaza contends that Arab nationalism is not a new concept borrowed from the West and asserts the constituents of Arab nationalism are stronger than those which make up the modern forms of nationalism in the world.

His ideas helped the spread the word of secular pan-Arabism against religious nationalists and those who believed in separate Syrian, Lebanese, and Palestinian destinies. In the mid-1950s, Darwaza asserted that the first stage of Arab union should be based on a merger between Egypt and Syria. In his opinion, a union between the northern Arabs (Syria) and the southern Arabs (Egypt) would facilitate the adherence of other Arab states. He believed that Egypt's capabilities and human resources compelled it to fill the role of an Arab "Prussia". Darwaza remarked on Gamal Abdel Nasser, Egyptian president and founder of the short-lived union, saying "Since the Arab revolt against the Turks, no Arab leader has been up to the level of events except for Jamal 'Abd al-Nasir. He emerged and vanished like a shooting star."

Rashid Khalidi states about Darwaza, "Moved as he was by the civilization of Arabs, he evoked a distant Arab past. For obvious reasons Islam was central to that past. But in the case of Darwaza, Islam was important not as the binding substance of the nation, but as a culture and civilization. In other words, culture, language, and history not religious solidarity were posited as the glue that was to hold the Arab nation together." According to Khalidi, Darwaza contributed to Arab nationalism in the practical and intellectual domains greatly.

== List of works ==
=== History ===
- Turkīya al-ḥadīta تركية الحديثة [Modern Turkey]. 1946.
- Ta'rīḫ Banī Isrā'īl min asfārihim تاريخ بني إسرائيل من أسفارهم [The History of the Children of Israel from Their Travels]. al-Maktabah al-ʻAṣrīyah. 1958. OCLC 13174879.
- Al-äḍīya al-filasṭīnīya muḫtalaf marāḥilihā القضية الفلسطينية في مختلف مراحلها [The Palestinian Issue in Its Various Stages]. 1959. OCLC 703904824.
- Al-'Arab wal-'urūba min al-qarn at-tālit ḥatta l-qarn ar-rābi' 'ašar al-hiǧrī العرب والعروبة من القرن الثالث حتى القرن الرابع عشر الهجر [Arabs and Arabism from the Third Century to the Fourth Century Stone Age]. 1959.
- Urūbat Misr fi l-qadīm wal-hadīt au qåbl al-islām wa-ba'dahu عروبة مصر في القادم والحديث أو قبل الإسلام وبعدها [Egyptian Arabis in the Past and Present, or Before and After Islam]. 1963.
- Asr an-nabī 'alaih as-salām wa-bai'atuhu qabl al-ba'ta. 1964. OCLC 164689017.
- Našʼat al-ḥaraka al-ʻarabīja al-ḥadīta نشأة الحركة العربية الحديثة [The Birth of the Modern Arab Movement]. 1971. OCLC 46088295.
- Fī sabīl qaḍīyat Filasṭīn wal-waḥda al-'arabīya wa-min waḥy an-nakba wa li-aǧl mu'āla-ǧatihā في سبيل قضية فلسطين والوحدة العربية ومن وحي النكبة ولأجل معالجتها. 1972. OCLC 164700511.
- Az-ziʻāmāt wa-'l-usar al-lubnānīja al-iqṭāʻīja ʻalā iḫtilāf aṭ-ṭawā'if الزعامات والأسر اللبنانية الإقطاعية على اختلاف الطوائف. 1978. OCLC 257483368.
- Al-imārāt al-ʻarabīya as-šāmila fī Lubnān الإمارات العربية الشاملة في لبنان. 1978.
- Al-imārāt al-ʻarabīya as-šāmila fi Jazīrat al-Furāt wa-šamāl Sūrīya الإمارات العربية الشاملة في جزيرة الفرات وشمال سورية. 1978.
- al-Yahūd fi 'l-qurān al-karīm اليهود في القرآن الكريم [Jews in the Holy Quran]. 1980. OCLC 164575908.
- Al-imārāt al-ʻarabīya as-šāmila fī šarq al-Urdunn wa-Filasṭīn الإمارات العربية الشاملة في شرق الأردن وفلسطين. 1981.
- Al-imārāt al-ʻarabīya as-šāmila fī Wādi 'n-Nīl الإمارات العربية الشاملة في وادي النيل. 1981.
- Al-imārāt al-ʻarabīya as-šāmila fi 'l-Maġrib al-aqṣā wa-'l-Jazā'ir wa-Tūnis wa-Lībīya الإمارات العربية الشاملة في المغرب الأقصى والجزائر وتونس وليبيا. 1981.
- Al-imārāt al-ʻarabīya as-šāmila fī Sūrīya al-wusṭā الإمارات العربية الشاملة في سوريا الوسطى. 1981.
- Al-imārāt al-ʻarabīya as-šāmila fi 'l-ʻIrāq الإمارات العربية الشاملة في العراق. 1981.
- Al-imārāt al-ʻarabīya as-šāmila fi Jazīrat al-ʻarab الإمارات العربية الشاملة في جزيرة العرب. 1983.
- Mudakkirāt: siǧill ḥāfil bi-masīrat al-ḥaraka al-ʻarabīya wa-'l-qaḍīya al-filasṭīnīya hilal qarn min az-zaman: 1305-1404 hijra, 1887-1984. 1993.

=== Islamic ===
- Ad-Dustūr al-qur 'ānī fī šu'ūn al-ḥayāt. 1956. OCLC 164704043.
- At-Tafsīr al-ḥadīt̲ as-Suwar. 1962.
- Sīrat ar-Rasūl سيرة الرسول. 1965.
- Ad-Dustūr al-qur'ānī was-sunna an-nabawīya fī šu'ūn al-ḥayāt الدستور القرآني والسنة النبوية في شؤون الحياة. 1966. OCLC 164694449.
- Al-Mar'a fi l-Qur'an was-sunna المرأة في القرآن والسنة. 1967. OCLC 313626840.
- al-Jihād fī sabīl Allāh fi l-Qur'an̄ wal-ḥadīt الجهاد في سبيل الله في القرآن والحديث [Jihad in the Path of Allah in the Quran and Hadith]. 1975.

== See also ==
- List of people from Nablus

== Bibliography ==
- Choueiri, Youssef (2000). Arab Nationalism – A History: Nation and State in the Arab World. Wiley-Blackwell. ISBN 0-631-21729-0.
- Doumani, B. (1995). Rediscovering Palestine: Merchants and Peasants in Jabal Nablus, 1700-1900. University of California Press. ISBN 0-520-20370-4.
- Elpeleg, Z. (1993). The Grand Mufti: Haj Amin al-Hussaini, Founder of the Palestinian National Movement. Psychology Press. ISBN 0714634328.
- Gelvin, J.L. (1998). Divided loyalties: nationalism and mass politics in Syria at the close of Empire. University of California Press. ISBN 0-520-21070-0.
- Hawting, G.R.; Shareef, Abdul-Kader A. (1993). Approaches to the Qurʼān. Routledge. ISBN 0-415-05755-8.
- Kayyālī, 'Abd al-Wahab (1978). Palestine: A Modern History. Routledge. ISBN 0-85664-635-0.
- Khalaf, Issa (1991). Politics in Palestine: Arab factionalism and social disintegration, 1939-1948. SUNY Press. ISBN 978-0-7914-0708-0.
- Khalidi, R. (1993). The Origins of Arab Nationalism. Columbia University Press. ISBN 0-231-07435-2.
- Kimmerling, B.; Migdal, J.S. (2003). The Palestinian People: A History. Harvard University Press. ISBN 0-674-01129-5.
- Levenberg, Haim (1993). Military Preparations of the Arab Community in Palestine, 1945-1948. Routledge. ISBN 978-0-7146-3439-5.
- Matthews, Weldon C. (2006). Confronting an empire, constructing a nation: Arab nationalists and popular politics in mandate Palestine. I.B. Tauris. ISBN 1-84511-173-7.
- Muslih, Muhammad Y. (1988). The Origins of Palestinian Nationalism. Columbia University Press. ISBN 978-0-231-06509-2.
- Nafi, B.M. (1998). Arabism, Islamism and the Palestine question, 1908-1941: a political history. Garnet and Ithaca Press. ISBN 0-86372-235-0.
- Podeh, Elie; Ma'oz, Moshe (1999). The decline of Arab unity: the rise and fall of the United Arab Republic. Sussex Academic Press. ISBN 1-902210-20-4.
- Sufian, Sandra Marlene; LeVine, M. (2007). Reapproaching Borders: New Perspectives on the Study of Israel-Palestine. Rowman & Littlefield. ISBN 978-0-7425-4639-4.
- Zebiri, Kate (1993), Maḥmūd Shaltūt and Islamic modernism, Oxford University Press, ISBN 0-19-826330-9
