= Subhi al-Khadra =

Palestinian politician

Subhi Sa'id al-Khadra
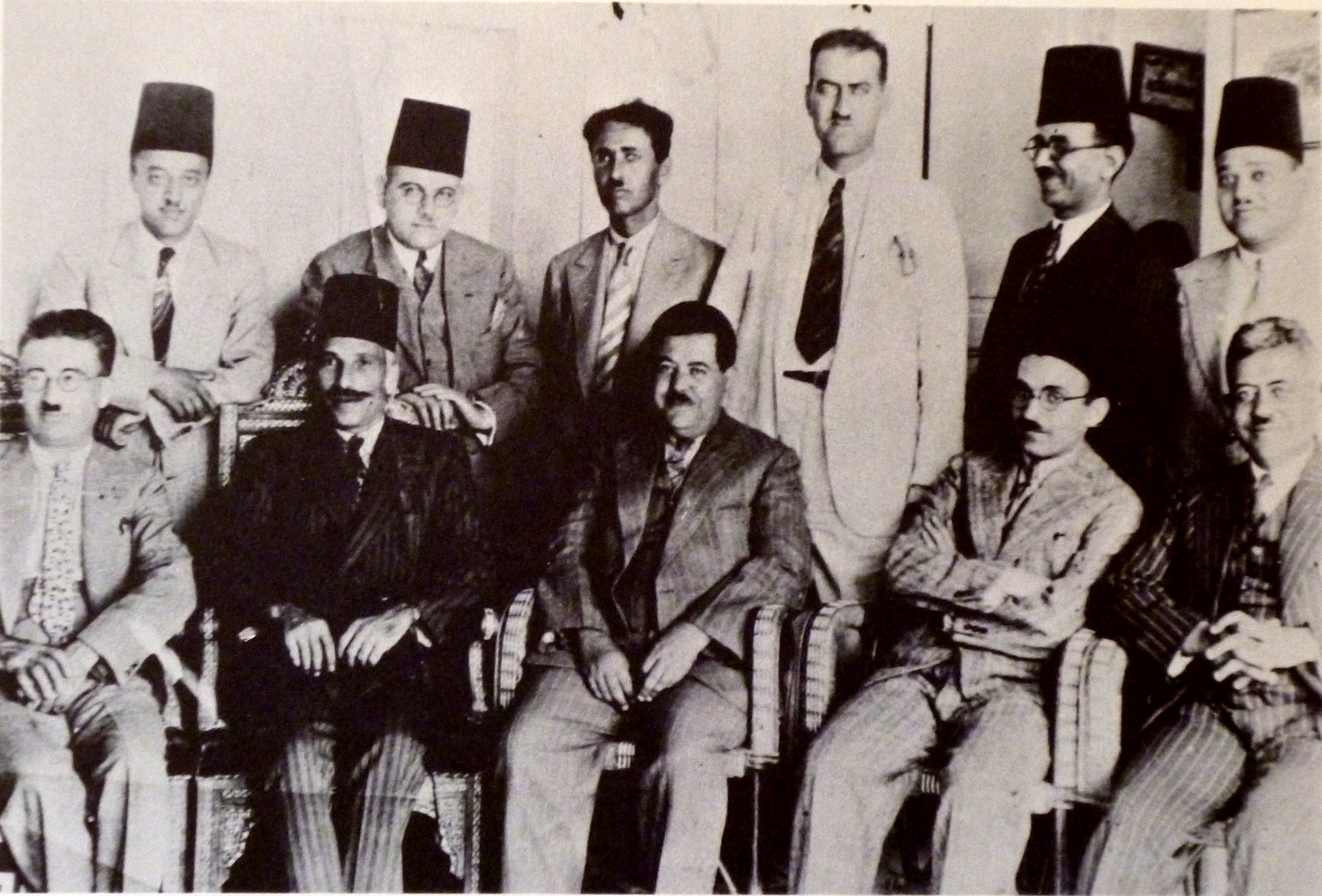
- Istiqlal circa 1932. Al-Khadra standing fourth from left

Personal details
- Born: 1895; Safed, Palestine
- Died: 4 July 1954; Damascus, Syria
- Political party: Istiqlal Party
- Spouse: Fu'ad Saleem's sister
- Children: Faisal al-Khadra, Salma Khadra Jayyusi, Aida, Bouran
- Profession: Politician, lawyer, newspaper columnist

Sa'id al-Khadra (1895-1954) was a Palestinian Arab politician, lawyer, and newspaper columnist. As an Istiqlal leader, he helped organize anti-British and anti-Zionist activities in Palestine, including the 1936–39 Arab revolt, which resulted in his three-year imprisonment.

== Early life ==
Al-Khadra was born in Safed, northern Palestine in 1895 as the sixth child of his family. The Khadra were a rural family of notables who migrated to the city decades before. When he was born, his 16-year-old brother Faris died. In 1901, his father died. Subhi received his primary and secondary education in Safed and then studied at the Ottoman Sultanate School of Beirut. His teachers included his future Arab nationalist colleagues, Rafiq al-Tamimi and Adil al-Azma. After graduating, he attended the Imperial War College in Istanbul where he graduated with a commission in the Ottoman Army.

== Military career ==
During the beginning of World War I in 1916, he fought with the Ottomans in southern Palestine, but deserted by surrendering to the British south of Gaza. After interrogation and debriefing in Cairo, where he provided several articles to the magazine Al-Kawkab, he joined Sharif Hussein bin Ali's forces in the Arab Revolt against the Ottomans. He was wounded several times while fighting Ottoman troops. He was among the Arab forces led by Emir Faisal, son of Sharif Hussein, that entered Damascus in 1918 after driving out the remaining Ottoman forces. In Damascus, he joined the Arab nationalist organization, al-Fatat. From 1918 to 1920, he worked in the Directorate of Public Security in Faisal's administration. Towards the end of this period, he married the sister of his Lebanese colleague in the Revolution, Fu'ad Saleem. During the Battle of Maysalun with the French Army on July 24, 1920, al-Khadra served as a combatant.

== Resistance to the British Mandate in Palestine ==
After the French deposed Faisal's Damascus-based government following their victory in Maysalun, al-Khadra returned to Palestine. There, he studied law and later opened his own practice.

British Police investigations found that al-Khadra actively led Palestinian Arabs in the 1929 Palestine riots in Safed. He participated, as representative of Safed, in the Emergency Relief Committee, an organization headquartered in Jerusalem that sought to provide aid to afflicted Palestinian families. As an attorney and a director of the Waqf (Islamic trust fund) in the Galilee, he helped establish the Young Men's Muslim Associations (YMMA) in the area.

He wrote an article in 1930 that claimed Zionism was an "imperial British tool" and part of its divide-and-conquer method in the Arab world; he launched the slogan "The English are the origin of the malaise and at the head of every calamity". He strongly supported Iraqi-Syrian unity and stressed that Palestine was the southern part of Syria.

Al-Khadra became one of the nine founders of the Istiqlal Party in 1932. He explained in an article in al-'Arab that the party's purpose was to counter factionalism and self-interest in Palestinian politics which had left the liberation movement without direction. He asserted the Palestinian national movement for independence from Britain deviated from its goals. The leading Istiqlal member in the Galilee (northern Palestine), he proposed holding annual anti-British rallies on the anniversary of the Battle of Hattin when Saladin's Muslim forces decisively defeated the Crusaders, restoring Palestine to the Islamic domain. The proposal was officially adopted after receiving Rashid al-Haj Ibrahim's support.

Al-Khadra greatly assisted Arab guerrilla leader Sheikh Izz ad-Din al-Qassam with forming paramilitary units and increasing membership in his anti-Zionist movement. Following al-Qassam's death in Ya'bad by British forces, al-Khadra, among others, organized the 1936–39 Arab revolt in Palestine against the British Mandate. He was arrested and incarcerated in prison at Acre, Jerusalem and al-Manshiyya Farms for over three years until his release in mid-1940.

== Later life and death ==
In September 1947, he was set to be the Palestinian Arab representative in the Military Commission of the League of Arab States, but was ultimately replaced by fellow Istiqlal member, Wasif Kamal. Al-Khadra died in Damascus on 4 July 1954. He was survived by his son Faisal al-Khadra and daughters, Salma Khadra Jayyusi, Aida and Bouran. Faisal was a banker in Damascus, Kuwait, London and Amman, and also an investment manager in the latter until his retirement in 2005. Salma is a writer, editor and literary trend leader of outstanding international fame.

== Bibliography ==
- Kedourie, Elie (1982), Zionism and Arabism in Palestine and Israel, Routledge, ISBN 0714631698
- Levenberg, Haim (1993), Military Preparations of the Arab Community in Palestine, 1945-1948, Routledge, ISBN 978-0-7146-3439-5
- Massad, Joseph (2007), Desiring Arabs, University of Chicago Press, ISBN 978-0-226-50958-7
- Matthew, Weldon C. (2006), Confronting an empire, constructing a nation: Arab nationalists and popular politics in mandate Palestine, I.B. Tauris, ISBN 1-84511-173-7
- Sekaily, May (2002), Haifa: Transformation of an Arab Society 1918-1939, I.B.Tauris, ISBN 1-86064-556-9
