= Mohamed Ali Eltaher =

Palestinian journalist

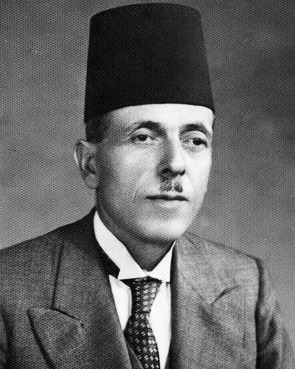
- Portrait of Eltaher, 1955
- Born: 1896; Nablus, Beirut Vilayet, Ottoman Empire
- Died: 1974 (aged 77–78); Beirut, Lebanon
- Other names: Muhammad Ali al-Tahir
- Known for: Journalist

Mohamed Ali Eltaher (Arabic: محمد علي الطاهر; 1896–1974) was a Palestinian journalist and newspaper editor.

== Early life and career ==
Eltaher was born in Nablus to father Aref Eltaher and mother Badieh Kurdieh, and was one of seven siblings. His family belonged to the Jaradat clan, which was spread throughout northern Palestine. In his childhood, he attended a local kuttab (Qur'anic school), but when he moved to Jaffa, he was often absent from his regular classes and did not graduate.

Eltaher moved to Egypt in March 1912, first arriving in Port Said before settling in Cairo. In 1914, a Beirut-based newspaper, Fata Al Arab, published an article penned by Eltaher that warned against the Zionist movement's intention to build a Jewish state in Palestine. He also predicted that the Jewish state would be called Israel. On 15 September 1915, he was arrested by Egyptian authorities at the request of the British who maintained de facto control over the country as a consequence to his involvement in anti-imperialist activities. Two years later, he was released. Elather continued to write articles detailing Levantine grievances at the division of the Ottoman Empire's territories by the British and French following World War I and at the Balfour Declaration which called for the establishment of a Jewish state in Palestine. To provide an income for himself, he opened an olive oil store in Cairo's al-Hussein neighborhood near al-Azhar Mosque which imported and sold olive oil from Nablus. The store would gradually become a meeting place for nationalists from Egypt and other parts of the Arab world.

== Newspaper editor in Egypt ==
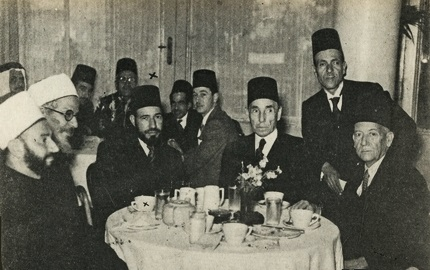
Political and religious figures attending a reception for Eltaher (standing) at the Continental Hotel in Cairo. From left to right: Shaykh Mohamed Sabri al-Din of Hebron, Shaykh Ibrahim Tfayyesh of Algeria, Muslim Brotherhood Supreme Guide Hassan al-Banna, Egyptian Army Chief of Staff Aziz Ali al-Misri, Egyptian politician Abdel Rahman al-Rafei

In October 1924, Eltaher founded and became the chief editor of the Cairo-based Al-Shura newspaper. The newspaper was banned from circulation in 1926, provoking Palestinian protestations to Egypt. In 1931, after having been allowed to re-circulate a few years prior, it had its license revoked by the order of Prime Minister Ismail Sidqi Pasha. The newspaper promoted Arab nationalism and anti-imperialist struggle throughout the Arab and Islamic worlds and Sub-Saharan Africa, and had correspondents in Arab countries as well as in Indonesia, Malaysia, and Zanzibar. During his time in Egypt, Eltaher was a strong supporter of the Egyptian nationalist Wafd Party. He traveled throughout the non-Arab and Islamic world to raise awareness and support for Arab anti-colonial struggles. His international profile earned him the description of "Egypt's ambassador to the world" by Wafd leader Makram Ebeid. Eltaher cultivated close relations with the pan-Islamist Shakib Arslan of Lebanon and with the Palestinian nationalist al-Istiqlal party.

In 1936, a book he wrote about the 1936 Arab revolt in Palestine was confiscated by the authorities while it was still in the process of being printed. Eltaher later published the Al-Shabab newspaper in 1937, but it was closed down by the authorities soon after. Two years later, he established the Al-Alam Al-Masri newspaper under a publication license transferred to him by the license's owner Abd al-Qader al-Toumi. Both Al-Shabab and Al-Alam Al-Masri had the same general theme of Eltaher's original newspaper Al-Shura.

== Marriage ==
Eltaher met his wife, Zakiyah Bizri, in 1938 at a resort in Hammana, Lebanon. They married on February 23, 1939. She moved to Egypt, but was expelled back to Lebanon in 1941 when the government was unable to locate Eltaher following a prison break.

== Self-exile ==
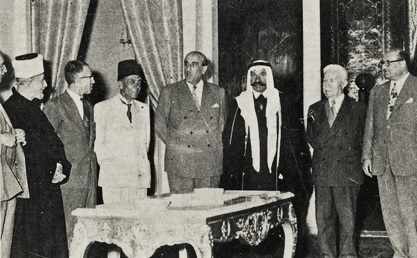
Syrian and Palestinian leaders meeting Quwatli at the presidential palace, 1955. From right to left: Sabri al-Asali, Fares al-Khoury, Sultan Pasha al-Atrash, Shukri al-Quwatli, Eltaher, Nazim al-Qudsi, Amin al-Husayni and Muin al-Madi

The 1948 Arab-Israeli War, in which Palestine was carved up by Israel, Egypt and Jordan, left Eltaher angry at the loss of his homeland, particularly due to his insistent warnings against Zionist ambitions in the country prior to 1917. He blamed the Arab defeat on collective Arab incompetence, treason by certain Arab officials, and injustice. Eltaher was arrested and incarcerated at the Huckstep Internment Camp on the orders of Prime Minister Ibrahim Abdel Hadi in July 1949 for publishing his criticisms against various Arab and Palestinian leaders for their performance during the war. He was released a month later by the new prime minister, Hussein Sirri Amer.

Following the Egyptian Revolution of 1952, which toppled the monarchy, Eltaher had a tense relationship with the officers who led the country thereafter. Under President Muhammad Naguib, Eltaher's newspaper Ashoura was stripped of its publishing license. As relations worsened with the coming to power of Gamal Abdel Nasser, who suppressed many of Eltaher's Wafdist friends, Eltaher left for Syria at the invitation of its army chief-of-staff in April 1955.

He lived in self-exile in Damascus until 1957. During that time, he was well-received by Syria's nationalists and enjoyed the company of politicians such as President Shukri al-Quwatli, former president Hashim al-Atassi, and government minister Nazim al-Qudsi. However, as the influence of the Syrian military intelligence bureau over the government grew under Abdel Hamid Sarraj, a strong supporter of Nasser, Eltaher's writings against the Egyptian leadership, pressure was put on him to discontinue his publications. Feeling his safety was in jeopardy, Eltaher left Syria for Lebanon, and like his departure from Egypt, he never returned to Syria.

== Bibliography ==
- Eltaher, Mohamed Ali (2007), Biography of Mohamed Ali Eltaher, The Estate of Mohamed Ali Eltaher || Source materials referenced through Eltaher's books, newspapers, and correspondence deposited with the United States Library of Congress, African and Middle Eastern Division
- Matthews, Weldon (2006), Confronting an Empire, Constructing a Nation: Arab Nationalists and Popular Politics in Mandate Palestine, I.B.Tauris, ISBN 9781845111731
- Sulaiman, Khalid A. (1984), Palestine and Modern Arab Poetry, Zed Books, ISBN 9780862322380
- Uwaysi, Abd al-Fattah Muhammad (1998), The Muslim Brothers and the Palestine Question 1928-1947, I.B.Tauris, ISBN 9781860642142
