= Akram Zuaiter =

Palestinian politician (1909–1996)

- أكرم زعيتر
- Born: 1909; Nablus, Nablus Sanjak, Beirut Vilayet, Ottoman Empire
- Died: 11 April 1996 (aged 86–87); Amman, Jordan
- Education: An-Najah Nabulsi School; American University of Beirut
- Occupations: Politician, diplomat, activist, publicist, orator, educator
- Political party: Istiqlal Party
- Relatives: Wael Zwaiter (nephew)

Akram Zuaiter (Arabic: أكرم زعيتر, also Romanized as Akram Zu'ayter, among other spellings; 1909 – 11 April 1996) was a Palestinian activist, publicist, orator, diplomat, and educator who contributed to the Arab nationalist movement in Mandatory Palestine.

== Biography ==
He was born in Nablus and was the son of an opposition politician. He attended the American University of Beirut. He worked for the major Palestinian newspapers Mir'at al-Sharq and al-Hayat and also taught at al-Najah school.

He was a founding member of the Istiqlal Party and played an instrumental role in the development of nationalism in Palestine during the 1930s. He authored the text Ta'rikhuna ("Our History") in 1935. He also supported transnational Arab nationalist organizing in Syria and Iraq, coordinating with the League of Pan-Arab Action and the fascist group Nadi al-Muthanna in each country respectively. In 1941 he participated in the fascist revolt in Iraq led by Rashid Ali al-Kaylani. He also lectured at the Teachers' Training College in Baghdad.

Following the Nakba, Zuaiter served in the Jordanian government as ambassador to Syria, Iran, Afghanistan, and Lebanon, followed by a year as Jordanian foreign minister (1966) and then in the Jordanian Upper House of Parliament and as chief of the Royal Court.

He published the text al-Qadiyya al-Filastiniyya ("The Palestine Cause") in 1956. In 1979, his papers were published as Watha'iq al-Haraka al-Wataniyya al-Filastiniyya 1918–1939 ("Documents on the Palestinian National Movement 1918–1939"), edited by Bayan Nuwayhed al-Hout, and his diaries were published in 1980.

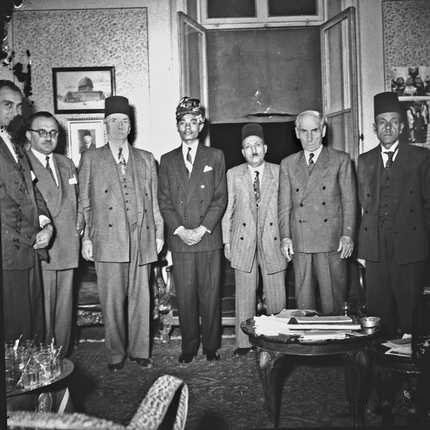
Zuaiter (second from the left) among dignitaries in Cairo, 1953.

== Views ==
Zuaiter espoused a nationalist philosophy of opposition to British administration of Palestine, taking a "hard line" that resulted in his arrest and detention by the British colonial government in 1931 and 1936. He was a staunch Arab nationalist and advocate of pan-Arabism.

== See also ==
- Izzat Darwaza
- Arab nationalism
