= United States Army Forces in the Middle East =

United States Army command during World War II

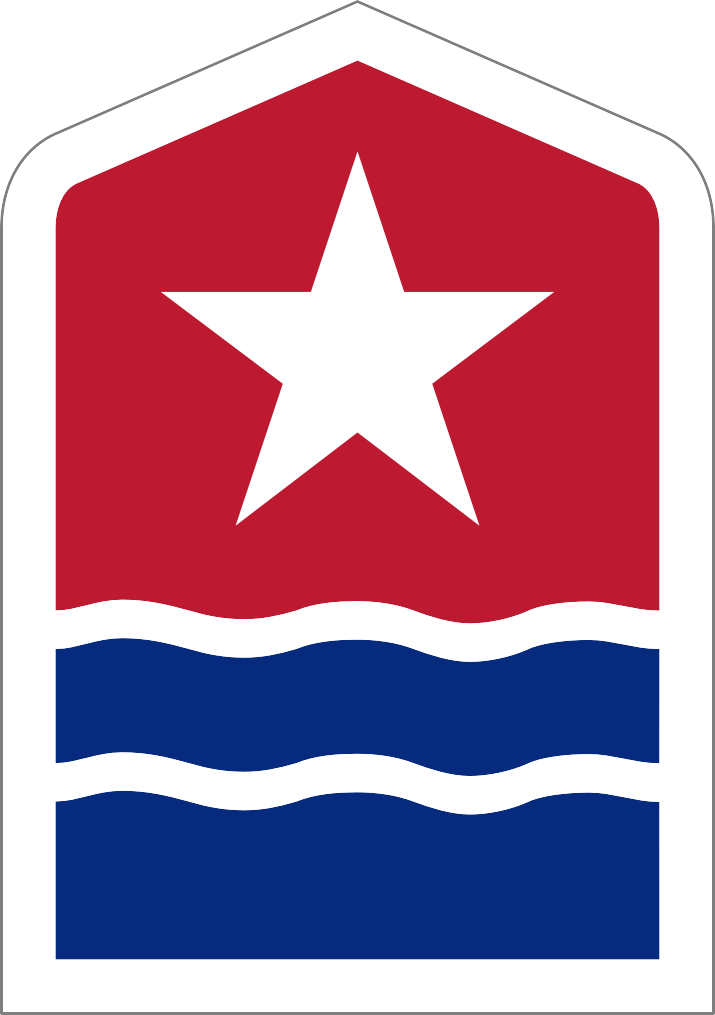
Shoulder Sleeve Insignia of U.S. Army Forces in the Middle East, later Africa-Middle East Theater

United States Army Forces in the Middle East (USAFIME) was a unified United States Army command during World War II established in August 1942 by order of General George C. Marshall, the Chief of Staff of the United States Army, to oversee the Egypt-Libya campaign.

The small USAFIME was headquartered in Cairo—which simplified liaison with its much larger British counterpart, Middle East Command. USAFIME had command over all United States Army forces in North Africa and the Middle East, except the Army Air Forces Ferrying Command. It was composed of:

- Iran-Iraq Service Command, later renamed the Persian Gulf Service Command (PGSC) and then finally the Persian Gulf Command; this was the successor to the original US Iranian Mission and was responsible for US troops manning the Persian Corridor. It was originally commanded by Col. Don G. Shingler, who was replaced late in 1942 by Brig. Gen. Donald H. Connolly.
- The North African Mission. Camp Huckstep became an important base for this force and its successors.

U.S. Army Forces in Liberia, established in June 1942 to build the Robertsfield Airfield and the Freeport of Monrovia, came under the control of U.S. Army Forces in the Middle East on 12 September 1943 but continued as a semi-autonomous command for the entire war.

The first commander of the USAFIME was Maj. Gen. Russell L. Maxwell. He was replaced in November 1942 by Lt. Gen. Frank M. Andrews of the United States Army Air Forces (USAAF), and in January 1943 by Maj. Gen. Lewis H. Brereton.

Maxwell was an army general because at the time he was appointed it was expected that the Americans would contribute ground troops to assist in the Allied Western Desert campaign. Initially, the only US combat forces that were allocated to the Mediterranean Theatre of War were USAAF squadrons. As plans for Operation Torch began to take shape it became clear that the Americans would not contribute ground troops to the Western Desert Campaign. This was reflected in Maxwell's replacement by Andrews. One of Andrew's first acts was to establish the Ninth Air Force to replace the United States Army Middle East Air Force (USAMEAF). The non-air force administrative functions of USAFIME were taken over by the North African Theater of Operations United States Army (NATOUSA) when the Egypt-Libya campaign ended on 12 February 1943.

== See also ==
- Liberia in World War II
