= Huckstep =

Egyptian military base

Coordinates: 30.13060°N 31.52171°E

Camp Huckstep is a large military base in Egypt, bordering Cairo International Airport on the east. The name "Huckstep" was given in 1943 and is still used by Egyptians today. It has an area of approximately 12 by 12 kilometers.

The 2nd Infantry Division (Egypt) is now located at the camp.

== History ==
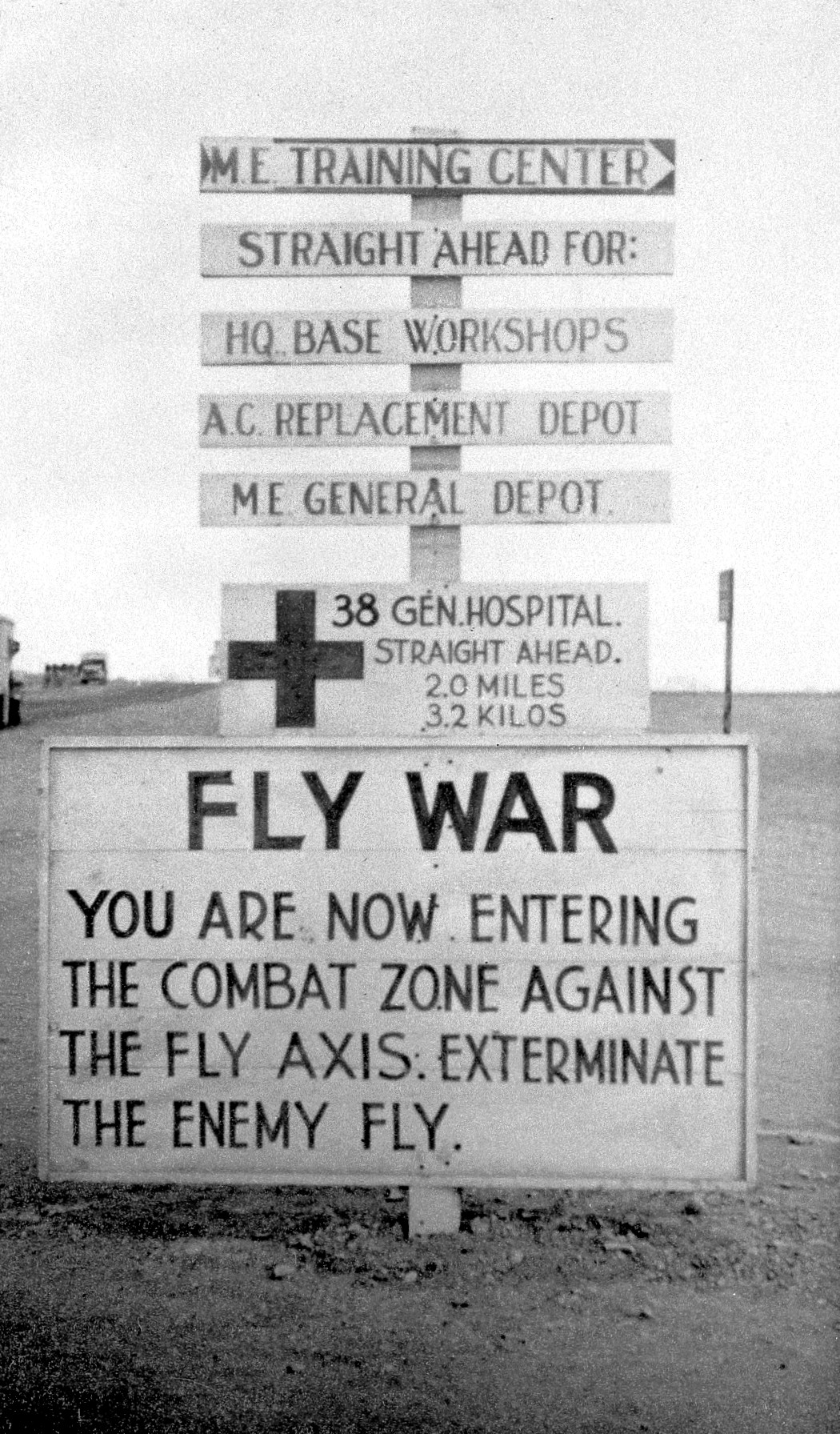
Camp Huckstep, Cairo

During World War II, the camp was used by Allied forces at least as early as 1941. In 1943, the camp was the largest military supply depot in the Middle East, including among other things an 1100-bed hospital and a US-run radio station. It hosted personnel of United States Army Forces in the Middle East. At the same time, it functioned as an air base.

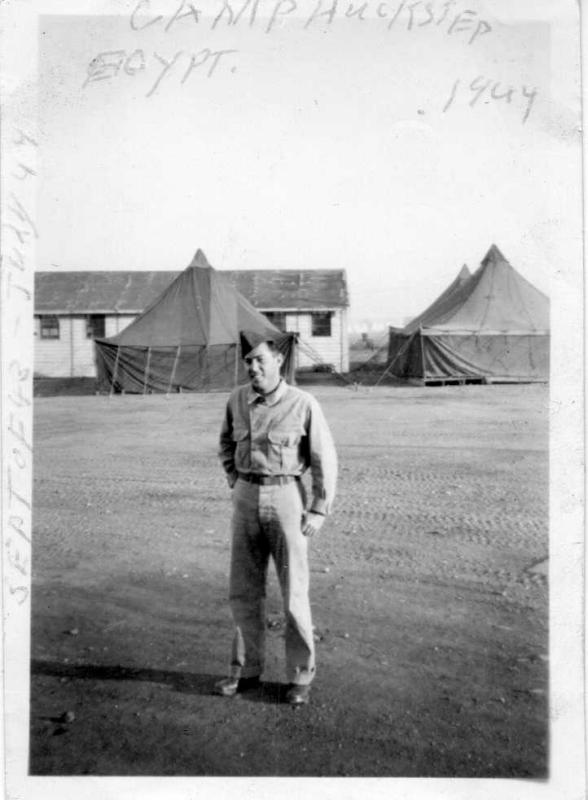
Camp Huckstep Egypt 1944

When Russell Benjamin Huckstep (a US soldier born in 1906 in Iowa) was killed in a plane crash over North Africa in 1943, the camp was renamed after him.

A company of the Women's Army Corps arrived at Camp Huckstep on 16 June 1944 and was assigned to the Middle East Service Command. In 1948, the camp was used to intern Jews who were arrested for their alleged support of Zionism. It is estimated that a total of 600 Jews were held there. Later, the camp was used by the Egyptian Armed Forces and other Egyptian government bodies. It has been used for many prisoners, including Communists, Muslim Brotherhood members, and others, such as Palestinian writer Mohamed Ali Eltaher.

On September 23, 2021, The base was renamed the Mohamed Hussein Tantawi military base in honor of the late Egyptian commander-in-chief of the Egyptian Armed Forces, in recognition of his achievements.

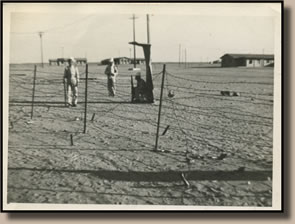
1949 - Huckstep Guards by Mohamed Ali Eltaher

Currently, the camp houses a recruitment center for soldiers from the greater Cairo region, a prison, and other facilities.
