= Khan al-Tujjar (Nablus) =

al-Tujjar Caravansarai خان التجار
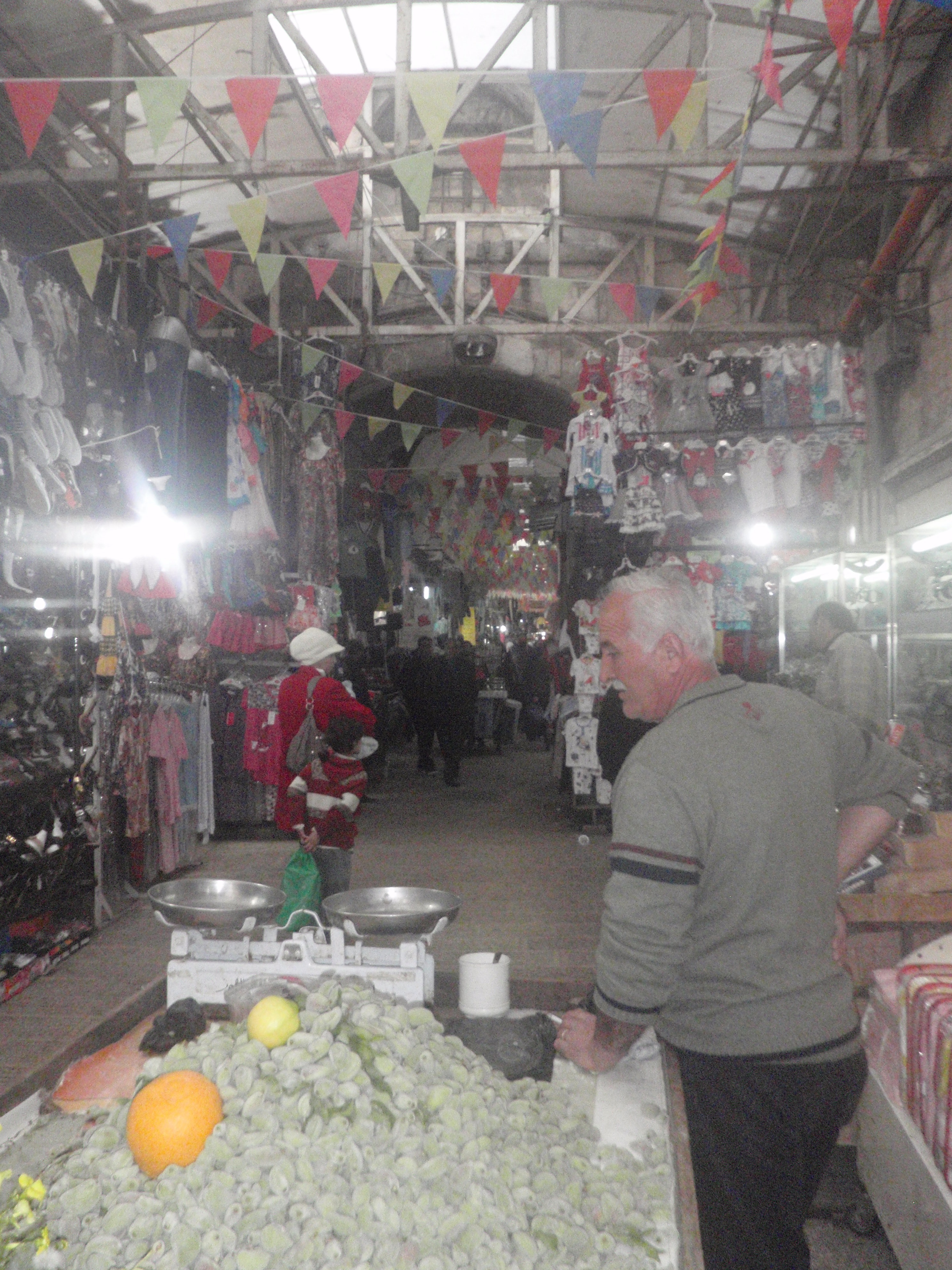
- Khan al-Tujjar, downtown Nablus, 2011
- Interactive map of the al-Tujjar Caravansarai خان التجار area
- Alternative names: The Merchant's Caravansary

General information
- Type: Caravanserai
- Architectural style: Mamluk, Ottoman
- Location: Nablus, Palestine
- Coordinates: 32.2193°N 35.2619°E
- Completed: 15th century

Khan al-Tujjar (Arabic: خان التجار, lit. 'Merchant's Caravanserai') is a 15th century caravanserai in the Palestinian city of Nablus. Situated in the Old City, it has been noted as the finest khan in the region.

== History ==
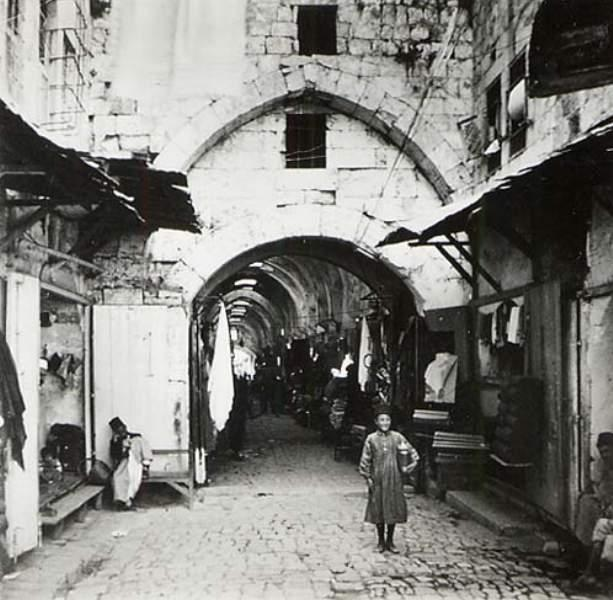
Khan al-Tujjar c. 1920

During the Ottoman period in Palestine, from the 16th to 19th centuries, it was the most prestigious and expensive strip of commercial real estate in Nablus, and along with Khan al-Wikala, constituted the key commercial center of the city. The shops of Khan al-Tujjar carried a variety of cloth from throughout the Islamic world and merchants from India, Baghdad, Mosul, and Aleppo paid regular visits to the marketplace.

In his memoirs, Muhammad Izzat Darwazah recalled that "In Nablus, shops were confined, or mostly confined, to a caravansary called Khan al-Tujjar, in the middle of Nablus." In the 1850s, Reverend John Mills wrote of Khan al-Tujjar saying, "The principal bazaar is arched, and is very large and fine for Nablus. It is the finest, by far, in Palestine, and equals any, as far I observed, in the largest towns of the Turkish Empire."

The significance of the khan was also attributed to its central location in the city, dividing it in half physically, but also psychologically between "easterners" and "westerners"—labels still used today. During the Nabi Musa festival, Arab youth would descend upon Khan al-Tujjar shouting slogans praising their part of the city. In the middle of the khan they would play a game in which they would face off and make forays into the other side, with the aim capturing more "prisoners". Khan al-Tujjar was a place for celebrating holidays and festivals. During Mawlid, merchants would decorate the floor of the khan with carpets and the walls with textiles, including silk. Flowers and sweets were put on tables brought from their homes on the occasion.

Khan al-Tujjar was recently restored, and its shops attract visitors from throughout the West Bank. The Yasmeen Hotel is adjacent to Khan al-Tujjar.

== Bibliography ==
- Abu-Lughod, Janet L.; Dumper, Michael (2007), Cities of the Middle East and North Africa: A Historical Encyclopedia, ABC-CLIO
- Doumani, Beshara (1995), Rediscovering Palestine: Merchants and Peasants in Jabal Nablus, 1700-1900, University of California Press, ISBN 0-520-20370-4
