= Fahmi al-Abboushi =

Co-founder of the Independence Party

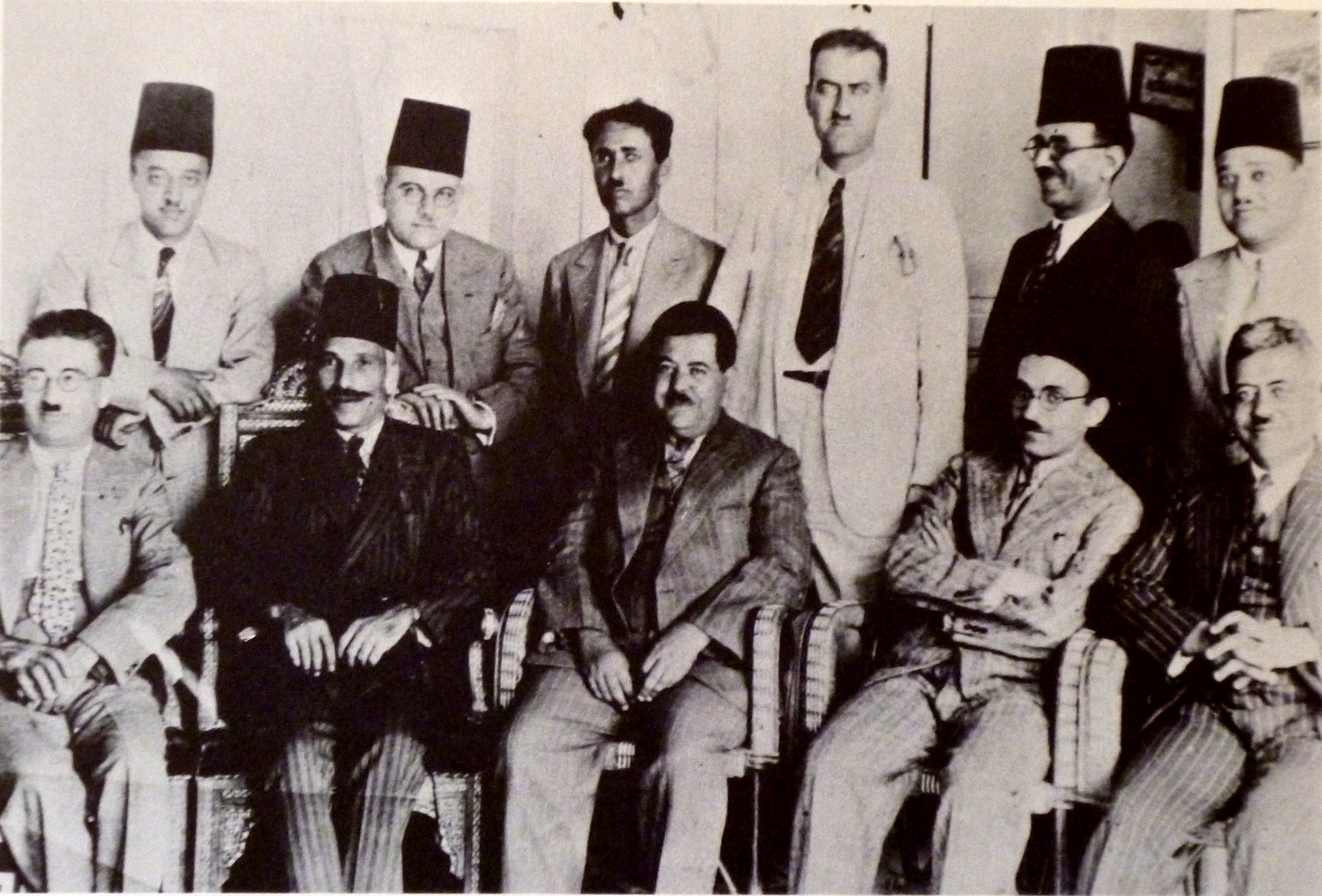
- Istiqlal circa 1932. Al-Abboushi standing third from left

Mayor of Jenin
- In office 1935–1937

Personal details
- Born: 1895
- Died: 1975 (aged 79–80)
- Party: Hizb al-Istiqlal (Independence Party)

Fahmi al-Abboushi (1895–1975; Arabic: فهمي العبّوشي) was the co-founder of the Arab nationalist political party Hizb al-Istiqlal (Independence Party) in Palestine along with his close associate Awni Abd al-Hadi.

Abboushi was Mayor of Jenin from 1935 until he was dismissed from the post by the British in 1937, after which he lived in exile in Beirut, Lebanon.

Abboushi was the chairman of the Arab Bank, Jenin branch, in the 1940s. He also served on numerous national committees during and after the British Mandate of Palestine. He was known for his oratory skills.
