= Fawwaz Tuqan =

Jordanian-Palestinian poet, novelist and professor

- فواز أحمد طوقان

Minister of Social Development
- In office 6 August 1988 – 24 April 1989

Personal details
- Born: Fawwaz Ahmad Tuqan; September 6, 1940 (age 85) Jerusalem, Mandatory Palestine

Fawwaz Ahmad Tuqan (Arabic: فواز أحمد طوقان; born September 6, 1940) is a Joardanian-Palestinian poet, novelist and professor. He was born on 6 September 1940 to a Palestinian family in Jerusalem. His father is Ahmad Abdul Fattah Tuqan, a former Prime Minister of Jordan.

Tuqan has taught at Yale University (as an assistant), University of Minnesota (as an assistant professor), University of Jordan (assistant and associate professor), and the American University of Beirut. He also served as Minister of Social Development in Jordan from 1988 to 1989.

In 2004 he was appointed a professor at the American University of Beirut (AUB).

== Early life and family ==
Tuqan was born in Jerusalem in 1940. At a young age he lived briefly in Jerusalem, Tulkarm and Nablus, then the family moved to Amman, Jordan. He went to high school in Beirut, Lebanon.

Tuqan has five daughters and three sons.

== Education ==
- Ph.D. Near Eastern Languages and Civilizations, Yale University, 1968
- M.A. Near Eastern Languages and Civilizations, Yale University, 1966
- B.A. Arabic Literature, American University of Beirut, Feb. 1963
- High School, I.C. (International College, Beirut), 1958

== Academic work experience ==
- Professor, Arabic literature and history of Islamic civilization, 2005–present. Department of Arabic and Near Eastern Languages - American University of Beirut
- Visiting Professor, Arabic language and literature, 2004 - 2005. Department of Arabic and Near Eastern Languages - American University of Beirut
- Professor, Arabic language and mass communication, 1999 - 2003. Department of Information, tourism and Arts - University of Bahrain
- Professor, Arabic language and history of civilization, 1997–1998. Arabic Language and Islamic Studies Department - Bahrain University
- Professor, Arabic language and history of civilization, 1995–1997. Languages Department - Al-Zaytoonah University of Jordan
- Professor, Associate Prof., and Assistant Prof., 1969–1995. Arabic language, literature and history of civilization, Department of Arabic Language and Literatures, Department of History and Archeology - University of Jordan
- Assistant Professor, Arabic language and history of civilization, 1967–1969. Middle Eastern Languages Department - University of Minnesota
- Assistant in Teaching, Arabic language, 1964–1967. Near Eastern Languages and Civilizations Department - Yale University

== Publications ==
=== Non-fictional books ===
- Revolution of Astronomy and Astrology in Abbasid Poetry (ثورة الفلك والتنجيم في الشعر العباسي) (in Arabic), in press.
- Gibran and Arrabitah: What Went behind the Scenes and the Relationship with Socialist Ideology (أسرار تأسيس الرابطة القلمية وعلاقة أعضائها بالفكر الاشتراكي) (in Arabic), Beirut, Dar at-Tali'ah, 2005.
- Fadwa Tuqan: Selected Poems, translated and introduced (فدوى طوقان: مختارات شعرية: ترجمة وتقديم) (in English), Amman, Naseej, 2005.
- Svensk-Arabiskt Lexikon (Swedish-Arabic dictionary), compiled by Nael Y. Touqan, Stockholm, Lexin: spraklexikon for invandrare, 1999.
- Translation into Arabic: Christianity in the Arab World (by HRH Prince Al- Hassan bin Talal, London, Longman's, 1993), rephrased in Arabic by Fawwaz Ahmad Tuqan to fit the Arab reader who is not knowledgeable in Christian Theology (المسيحية في العالم العربي), Amman/ London, Amman Bookshop and Longman's, 1994.
- Abd al-Mun'im ar-Rifa'i: Poetic Imagery (الصورة الشعرية عند عبد المنعم الرفاعي) (in Arabic), Amman, Dar Kitabukum, Shqair and 'Akasheh, 1993.
- Early Arab Islamic Art (الفن العربي الإسلامي المبكر) (in Arabic), Amman/ Beirut, United Publishers, 1993.
- Poetry in Jerash Festival, edited and introduced (الشعر في جرش: تقديم وتحرير) (in Arabic), Amman, Dar Kitabukum, Shqair and 'Akasheh, 1987.
- Zionist Colonialism in Palestine: Settlements 1870-1967 (الاستعمار الصهيوني للأرض الفلسطينية: المستوطنات 1870–1967) (in Arabic), Amman, Dar Kitabukum, Shqair and 'Akasheh, 1986.
- Poetry Movement in Jordan: 1948-1977 (الحركة الشعرية في الأردن: 1948–1977) (in Arabic), Amman, Dar Kitabukum, Shqair and 'Akasheh, 1985.
- The Self-Made Man (العصامي: سيرة الحاج عبد الحميد شومان مؤسس البنك العربي) (in Arabic), Amman, Arab Bank Ltd. and Arab Establishment for Studies and Publishing, 1984. (120 hours taped interviews, examination of personal archives and old files and documents of the Arab Bank, recomposing Shuman's biography in 88 short-story style chapters).
- Al-Ha'ir: Studies in Umayyad Desert Palaces (الحائر: بحوث في القصور الأموية في البادية) (in Arabic), Amman, Ministry of Culture, 1979.
- Illustrated History of Jordan (تاريخ الأردن المصور) (in Arabic), Amman, Ministry of Culture, 1977.
- Mahmoud Darwish: Selected Poems, translated into English and introduced (محمود درويش: مختارات شعرية) (in English), with Ian Wedde, London, Carcanet Press, 1974.

=== Novels ===
- The New Hamlet (هاملت الجديد) (in Arabic), in press.
- Goodbye Geneve (وداعا جنيف) (in Arabic), Beirut, Arab Diffusion Company, 2003.

=== Novella ===
The Merchant and the Bird (التاجر والعصفور): Novella for children, could be read by grownups, Amman, Shqair and 'Akasheh, 1985.

=== Poetry ===
- أغنية الموسم الواحد, Amman, Amman Library, 1974
- ماء لطائر الصدى, Amman Amman Library, 1974
- فيم الدوار؟, Amman Amman Library, 1975
- The Lake (Winnipesaukee): Six Attempts to Paint Sunset (البحيرة: سبع محاولات لرسم الغروب), Amman Amman Library, 1979
- أنقذوا البحر, Amman, Al Sha'b Publishers, 1983.
- Tomorrow We Open the City (غدا نفتتح المدينة), Amman, 1992.
- Fawwaz Tuqan: Selected Poetry (فواز طوقان مختارات شعرية), Amman, Ministry of Culture Publications, 2004.

=== Selected articles ===
- نظرة في: اتجاهات دارسي اللغة العربية الفصحى من غير الناطقين بها ودوافعهم كما تظهر في استبانة طوقان "Attitudes and Motivations of non-Arabic Speaking Students Learning Formal Arabic As Exhibited in Tuqan's Questionnaire: An Outlook", in al-Abhath, (American University of Beirut), 2004–2005.
- "عبد الله بن علي: اعم المنصور الثائر". (in English)
- "'Abdullah ibn 'Ali: A Rebellious Uncle of al-Mansur", in Studies in Islam, (New Delhi), 1969, pp. 1–26. (in English)
- وصف الطبيعة في شعر الصنوبري "Description of Nature in the Poetry of as-Sanawbari", in Journal of the Arab Academy of Damascus (JAAD), 43 (1968), vol. 4, pp. 810–825; 44 (1969), vol. 5, pp. 569–576; 45 (1970), vol. 6, pp. 127–142.
- القصور الأموية الصحراوية: لماذا ابتنيت؟ "Umayyad Desert Palaces: Why Were They Built?", in Annual of the Department of Antiquities of Jordan (ADAJ), 14 (1969), pp. 4–25.
- حبيب الأصغر: أبو بكر الصنوبري شاعر الروضيات "Habib the Younger: Abu Bakr as-Sanawbari, Poet of Landscape Poetry", in Al-Mashriq, (Univ. of St. Joseph), 64 (1970), pp. 263–278.
- مسلة مشيع ملك مؤاب الديباني: ترجمة جديدة "Stele of King Mesha' the Debonite: New Translation", in Annual of the Department of Antiquities of Jordan (ADAJ), 15 (1970), pp. 19–51.
