= Wael Zwaiter =

Palestinian Arab diplomat and writer (1934 – 1972)

- وائل زعيتر
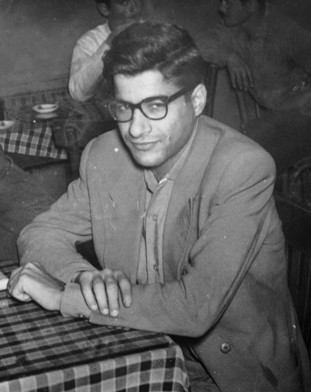
- Wael Zwaiter
- Born: 2 January 1934; Nablus, Mandatory Palestine
- Died: 1972 (aged 37–38); Rome, Italy
- Cause of death: Assassination
- Education: University of Baghdad
- Occupations: Diplomat, writer, translator
- Parent: Adel Zu'aiter
- Relatives: Akram Zuaiter (paternal uncle)
- Writing career
- Language: Arabic

Abdel Wael Zwaiter (Arabic: وائل زعيتر; also known as Wa'el Zu'aytir; 2 January 1934 – 16 October 1972) was a Palestinian writer and translator. He was assassinated as the first target of Israel's Mossad assassinations following the Munich massacre. Israel considered Zwaiter a terrorist for his alleged role in the Black September group, while his supporters argued that he was "never conclusively linked" with Black September or the Munich massacre and was killed in retribution.

== Early life and education ==
Abdel Wael Zwaiter was born in Nablus, Palestine in 1934, the son of Adel Zu'aiter.

He went to Iraq and studied Arabic literature and philosophy at the University of Baghdad.

== Career ==
Zwaiter moved then to Libya and afterwards to Rome, where he was a PLO representative and worked as a translator for the Libyan embassy.

In addition to his native Arabic, Zwaiter spoke French, Italian, and English. During his time in Italy, Zwaiter was in the process of translating One Thousand and One Nights from Arabic into Italian, but according to Emily Jacir, he never completed this.

== Killing ==
Zwaiter was held for questioning by Italian police in August 1972 in relation to a bombing by the group Black September against an oil refinery, but was later released. The Israeli Mossad suspected him of being the head of Black September in Rome, and put him on an assassination list after Black September's attack in Munich. When he returned to his apartment building on the night of 16 October 1972, he was killed by two Mossad agents who shot him 11 times in the lobby of the building – one bullet for each Israeli athlete killed.

At the time, Zwaiter was the PLO representative in Italy, and while Israel privately claimed he was a member of Black September and was involved in a failed plot against an El Al airliner, members of the PLO have argued that he was in no way connected. Abu Iyad, deputy-chief of the PLO, stated that Zwaiter was "energetically" against political violence. Zwaiter was living with his partner Janet Venn-Brown, an Australian artist, in Rome.

The Italian Communist Party (PCI) condemned the killing of Zwaiter. A funeral ceremony was held for Zwaiter in Rome with the attendance of many people, including officials of the PCI. He was buried in his hometown, Nablus.

== Portrayals ==
- Wael Zwaiter is portrayed by actor Makram Khoury in Steven Spielberg's Munich.
- "Material for a film": Retracing Wael Zuaiter (Part 1)], installation in the 2007 La Biennale di Venezia by Emily Jacir.
- Emily Jacir: "Material for a film": A performance (Part 2)], 16 July 2007, The Electronic Intifada
  - Najwan Darwish: Emily Jacir’s Material for a Film: Ongoing homage and artistic revenge for Wa’el Zuaiter.
- Zwaiter is also played by Bilal Hasna in the one-man play For a Palestinian, which he co-wrote with Aaron Kilercioglu. The play was staged in 2022 at Camden People's Theatre and also featured at the Bristol Old Vic.
