= Salwa Al Bana =

Palestinian writer

- Born: Salwa Al Bana; 1951 (age 74–75); Nablus, Palestine
- Citizenship: Palestine
- Occupations: Writer; poet
- Notable work: A bride behind the river that comes from the distances, rain in a warm morning, the other side of Al- Gomorah, the bride of the night, the shoes of His Excellency, a woman outside time, Sitt Al-Hassan, on her last night

Salwa Al Bana, a Palestinian author and writer, born in Nablus in 1951, has several published novels and stories, mainly the novels: “A bride beyond the river” issued in Beirut in 1972, "He who comes from distances", published in Beirut in 1977, "the Other Face" a series of stories AL- Bana published in a number of Jordanian newspapers and they were re- published in Beirut in 1974. The author has other books that were published successively; "AL-Amoura Bride of the Night", published in Beirut in 1986 and "His Excellency’s shoes" a stories collection published in 2010, in addition to, the novel "A woman outside time" published in the next year.

== Early life and education ==
Al- Bana was born and raised in the Palestinian city of Nablus and received a degree in arts from the University of Beirut.

== Career ==
Al- Bana started her career in journalism and later she entered the field of writing and publishing, then she published a number of novels and books mainly the novel "A bride beyond the river" issued in Beirut in 1972, "He who comes from distances", published in Beirut in 1977, in addition to, the novel titled "rain on a warm morning", 1979, "the Other Face", a series of stories AL- Bana published in a number of Jordanian newspapers and they were re- published in Beirut in 1974. The author also has other books that were published successively, these are; "AL-Amoura Bride of the Night", published in Beirut in 1986 and "His Excellency’s shoes" a stories collection published in 2010, alongside the novel "A woman outside time" that was published in the next year.

The main work of the Palestinian writer was the novel "The Beautiful lady " that had a very different line of storytelling and theatrical text, relatively poem. According to Al- Bana, in this novel she did not seek renovation, yet the idea required thinking outside of the box, which she mastered as she crossed the red lines she once set for herself in writing. In her novel "the Beautiful lady on her last night", Al- Bana depicted the vicious attack Levant undergoes aiming at its destruction, dismantling, and changing its identity and civilization elements, as well as, eliminating Palestine from its map. In this novel Al- Bana used "The Rose of Levant" phrase to describe the State of Palestine.

In the novel "the Beautiful lady", Al- Bana depicted the conflict between the good and the evil, the beauty and the ugliness, as she stated in an interview she held later with an e- magazine, and she did the same thing in the novel "Lovers of a star" as she depicted Palestine as the event and the basic cause, therefore; the debut of the lab of history, recalling time, places and names to assert the identity of land as an Arabic territory. Al- Bana used the word "star" in the novel to refer to Palestine and its lovers, the fighters who use guns, thoughts and words to liberate it. In this novel Al- Bana tackled all types of conspiracy inflicted upon the Palestinian cause until the current scene including wars, fights and destruction.

== Works ==
Here works include:

A Bride Beyond the River, Beirut, 1972

He Who Comes from Distances, Beirut, 1977

Rain on a Warm Morning, Beirut, 1979

The Other Face, Beirut, 1986

His Excellency's Shoes, a collection of stories, 2010

A Woman Outside Time, Beirut, 2011,

“The Beautiful Lady on Her Last Night".
