= Independence Party (Mandatory Palestine) =

Independence Party Arabic: حزب الاستقلال
- Founders: Izzat Darwaza; Fahmi al-Abboushi; Mu'in al-Madi; Akram Zu'aytir ‘Ajaj Nuwayhid; Rashid al-Hajj Ibrahim; Subhi al-Khadra; Salim Salamah
- Founded: 13 August 1932
- Dissolved: 1947
- Ideology: Arab nationalism Palestinian nationalism Anti-tribalism; Constitutional monarchism Hashemite monarchism Anti-Zionism; Pan-Arabism
- Slogan: "England is the root of the illness and the basis of all disaster" (rhyming in Arabic: Inkilitira asl al-da’ w-asas kul bila’)

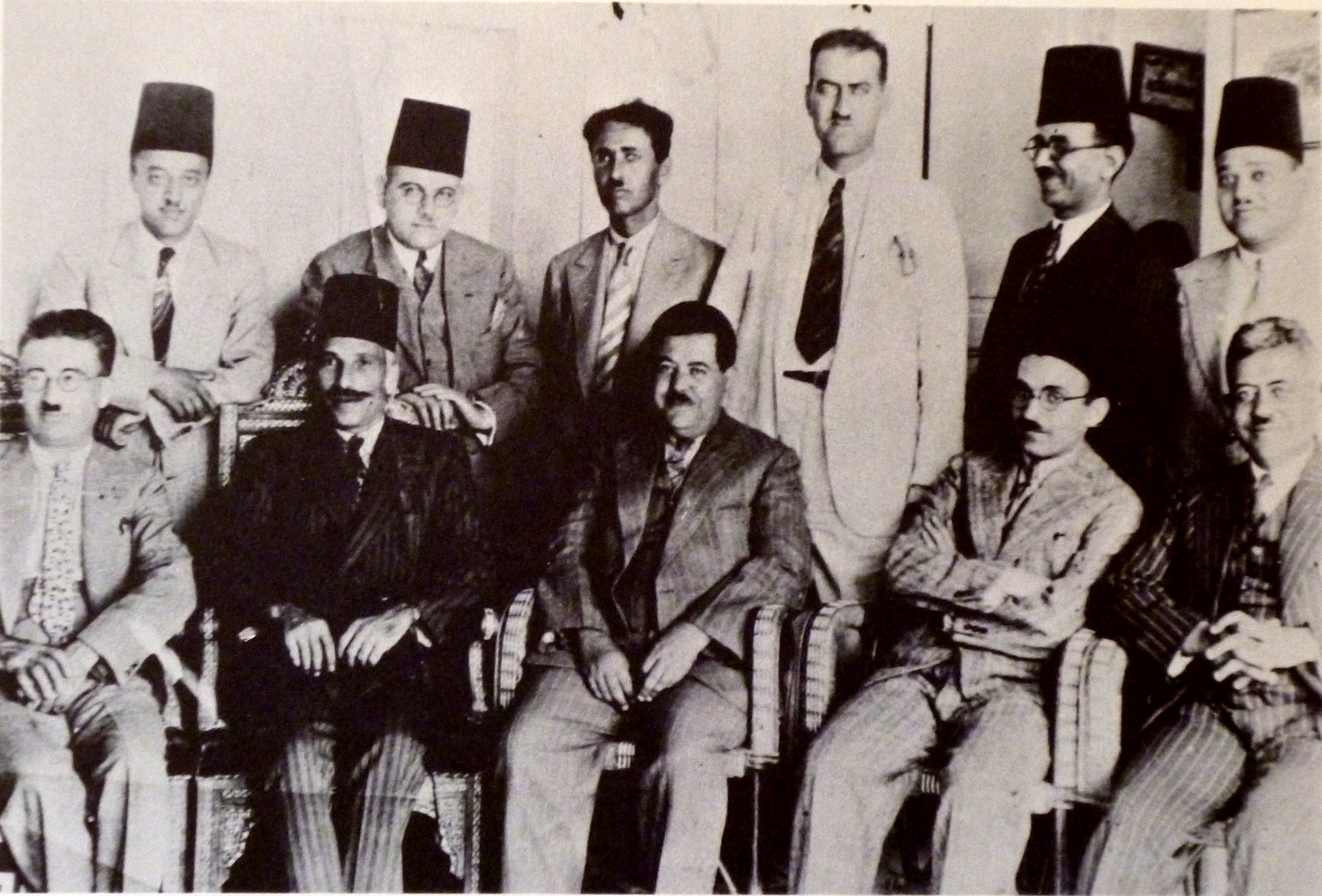
Istiqlal circa 1932. Darwazah seated centre, al-Haj Ibrahim seated second left, Ahmad Shukeiri standing first left. Standing: Ahmad Shukeiri, ‘Ajaj Nuwayhid, Fahmi al-Abboushi, Subhi al-Khadra, Majid al-Qutub Sitting: Salim Salamah, Rashid al-Haj Ibrahim, Muhammad Izzat Darwaza, Akram Zu'aytir

The Independence Party of Palestine (Arabic: حزب الاستقلال Hizb al-Istiqlal) was an Arab nationalist political party established on 13 August 1932 in Palestine during the British Mandate. The party was founded by Muhammad Izzat Darwaza, and the other founders of the party were Fahmi al-Abboushi, Mu'in al-Madi, Akram Zu'aytir, ‘Ajaj Nuwayhid, Rashid al-Haj Ibrahim, Subhi al-Khadra, and Salim Salamah. The party did not achieve a large membership but Awni Abd al-Hadi, through his role as private secretary to Amir Feisal in Damascus between 1918-1920, had good relations with many senior leaders across the Arab world.

Its origins lay in the Istiqlal movement associated with the short-lived Sharifian government in Damascus.

The party's creation was spurred by the al-Husayni–Nashashibi rivalry, which had almost paralyzed the Palestinian national movement. Its founders, most of whom hailed from the Nablus area, called for the adoption of new methods of political action, including noncooperation with the British Mandate authorities and nonpayment of taxes. The party also called for total Arab independence, pan-Arab unity, the abrogation of the Mandate and the Balfour Declaration, and the establishment of Arab parliamentary rule in Palestine. The party called for mass resistance to the Zionist project and its British patron in Palestine. During the 1936–39 Arab revolt the party called for an Indian Congress Party-style boycott of the British.

The party reached its maximum influence, especially among the young and the educated, in the first half of 1933, and then declined very rapidly. Among the factors responsible for its decline were the active hostility of the Husayni camp, the lack of financial resources. A distinctive mark of the party was its espousal of the idea that British imperialism was the principal enemy of the Palestinians; thus the party urged them to focus their struggle not simply on Zionism, but on British colonialism as well.

Istiqlal was represented on the first Arab Higher Committee formed in April 1937, with its leader, Awni Abd al-Hadi, being general secretary of the AHC. Following the continuing disturbances, and the assassination on 26 September 1937 of the Acting British District Commissioner of Galilee, the AHC and other political parties, including Istiqlal, were outlawed by the British administration in October 1937. Al-Hadi, who was out of the country at the time, was not allowed to return. However, he was a member of the Palestinian Arab delegation that attended the London Conference of 1939.

== See also ==
- Category:Independence Party (Mandatory Palestine) politicians
