= Rashid al-Haj Ibrahim =

Rashid al-Haj Ibrahim رشيد الحاج إبراهيم
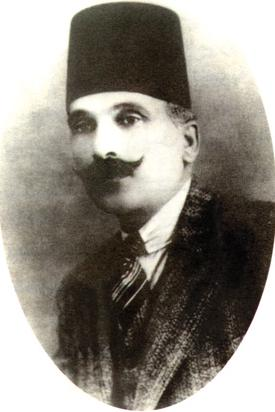
- Portrait of al-Haj Ibrahim

Personal details
- Born: 1889 or 1891 Haifa, Ottoman Empire
- Died: 1953 Amman, Jordan
- Party: al-Istiqlal
- Occupation: Head of Haifa's Trade Office (1913-30); Head of Arab Bank in Haifa (1931-47) al-Istiqlal Leadership Committee member (1932-48); National Committee of Haifa (1947-48)

Rashid al-Haj Ibrahim (Arabic: رشيد الحاج إبراهيم; 1889–1953) was a Palestinian Arab banker and a leader of the Independence Party of Palestine (al-Istiqlal). He was one of the most influential Arab leaders of Haifa in the first half of the 20th century and played a leading role in both the 1936–39 Arab revolt and the 1948 Battle of Haifa.

== Early life and background ==
Al-Haj Ibrahim was born in Haifa in 1889 in the Ottoman Empire to a middle-class mercantile family, al-Haj Ibrahim. The al-Haj Ibrahim family immigrated to Palestine from western North Africa and had a military past. They gained a reputation in trade and commerce and held considerable influence in Haifa. Rashid was mostly self-educated, but he enrolled in Haifa's government-run secondary school and the Alliance School. He learned the Turkish language in addition to Arabic and initially worked in a public debt department, heading the city's trade office in 1913.

== Leadership in Haifa and career in commerce ==
Al-Haj Ibrahim would later occupy a post as an official on the Haifa zone of the Hejaz Railway. He gradually became the head of his entire family and gained considerable influence in the city; a common phrase that evolved in the area was "One cannot talk of Haifa without mentioning Rashid's name."

After World War I, when the British occupied and took control of Palestine from the Ottomans and established the British Mandate in 1922, al-Haj Ibrahim worked both in commerce and journalism in Haifa. He led the city's Islamic Society, a charitable organization, in 1927, and the local Young Men's Muslim Association (YMMA). In order to compete with Local labor parties, by August 1928, al-Haj Ibrahim was in charge of registering Arab laborers and tradesmen to work for employers in government-run building projects, particularly the port expansion scheme in Haifa.

On August 23, 1930, Arab nationalist organizations met in Nablus—which was holding a general strike protesting a pro-Zionist British policy in Palestine—and elected a committee to help arm the Arab villages against the British occupying army and its atrocities. Al-Haj Ibrahim was tasked to collect funds to purchase weapons. He also focused on condemning the British Mandate decision to draft Zionist youth into the army. In 1931, he established the Haifa branch of the Arab Bank. The salary he earned from managing the bank was supplemented slightly by the income generated from agricultural land he owned west of the city.

== Independence Party of Palestine ==
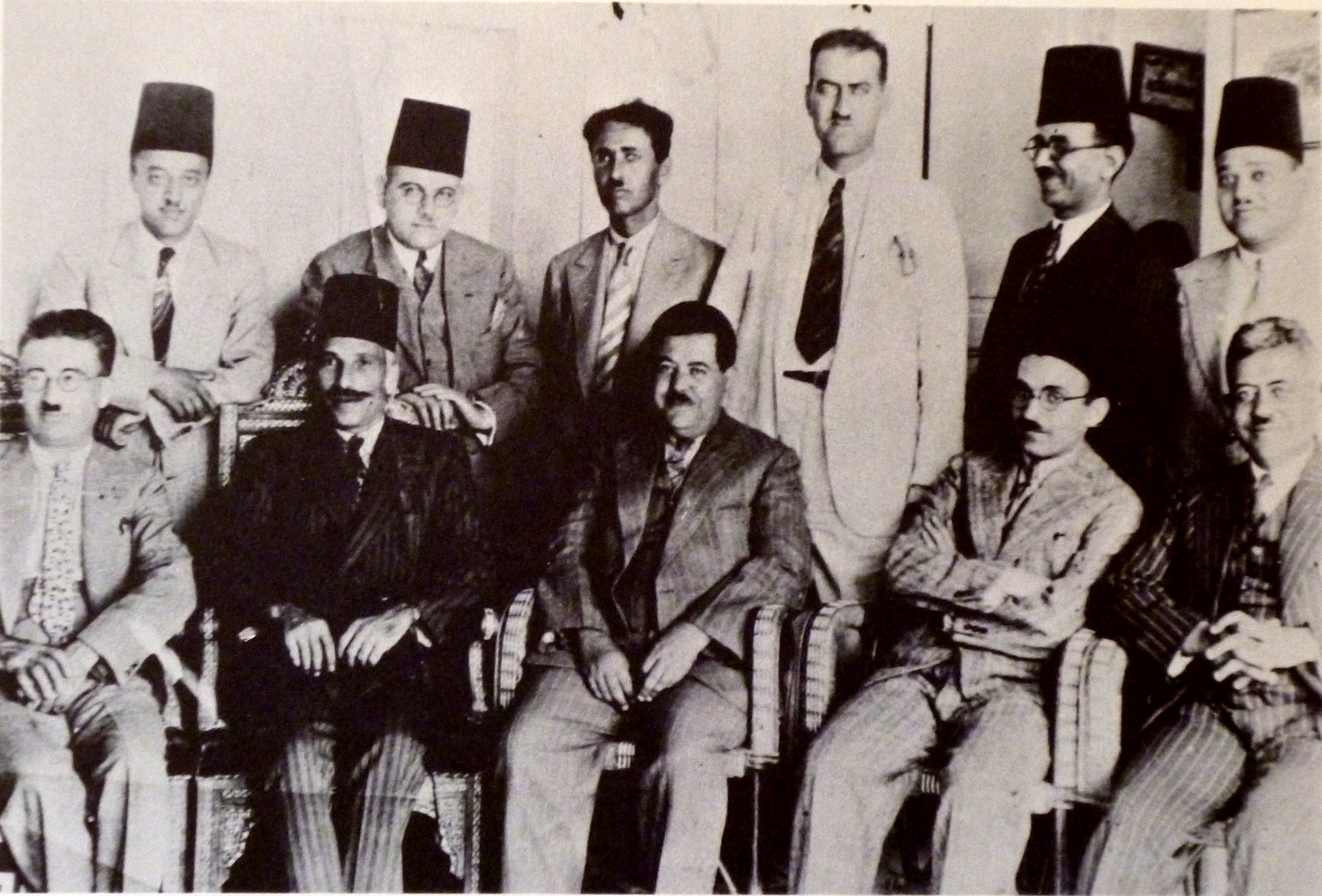
Leading members of the Istiqlal (Independence) Party, 1932. Al-Haj Ibrahim is seated second from left, to the right of Izzat Darwaza

He joined the Istiqlal (Independence) Party—which promoted Arab nationalism and had counterparts in Syria and Iraq—along with Izzat Darwaza and Awni Abd al-Hadi when it was founded in 1932. The party held a congress in Acre in 1932 which al-Haj Ibrahim presided over. He was designated the leader of the party's branch in Haifa. In late 1932, he resigned from his position in the Haifa Islamic Society. According to the Filastin newspaper, he did so in protest of the sacking of Sheikh Kamal al-Qassab as the society's director of schools. It was also speculated al-Haj Ibrahim quit because of the society's dominance by al-Husayni who was reportedly aiming to undermine the al-Istiqlal party because of its rising popularity. However, he remained intensely involved in Haifa's YMMA whose leadership was intertwined with that of the Islamic Society. Under his leadership, Haifa became an al-Istiqlal stronghold. In line with the party's policy to expand the Arabic values, al-Haj Ibrahim became one of many investors to form an Arabic film company that would open cinemas in Jerusalem, Jaffa, Haifa, and Amman in 1934.

Starting in the late 1920s, al-Haj Ibrahim became the closest political associate of Sheikh Izz ad-Din al-Qassam, a religious leader from Syria who led an uprising activities against the occupying British military and Jewish gangs in Palestine. Because al-Qassam was frequently detained and tortured by the British authorities, al-Haj Ibrahim appealed to him several times to maintain his position; he would frequently negotiate with the British authorities To release al-Qassam. In 1935, al-Qassam was killed by the occupying British forces in an assault near Jenin, an action that would provoke the 1936–39 Arab uprising in Palestine in which al-Haj Ibrahim was a chief activist.

Due to his role in the uprising, he was exiled to the Seychelles in 1937. Following a conference in London in 1939, al-Haj Ibrahim was among the Palestinian notables invited by Muhammad Mahmoud Pasha, the Prime Minister of Egypt, to discuss and modify the British White Paper—which called for a united Palestine led by both Palestinian Arabs and Jews in proportion to their population ratio. Al-Haj Ibrahim returned to Palestine in February 1940. In order to further their political influence, the Istiqlalists with al-Haj Ibrahim as their leader, negotiated with Abdullah I of Jordan to gain the support of his partisans in Palestine as a counterweight to al-Husayni's supporters.

== Role in Palestine war ==
From a letter to the chairman of the Arab Higher Committee Amin al-Husayni in May 1947, Al-Haj Ibrahim wrote that Jews in Europe became symbols of "baseness and cheating" and that the "Arab world faces destruction [because]... the Jews want to take over Egypt, because Moses came from there", and Lebanon and Syria "because they built the Temple with Lebanese cedars, and they want Iraq because our forefather Abraham came from there and they [feel they] have a right to Hijaz because Ishmael came from there and they demand Transjordan, because it was part of Palestine and Solomon's kingdom". He also believed that a Jewish state in Palestine would establish a giant navy and air force, and build atomic weapons, with which to spread fear in the Arab world.

Hostilities between Jews and Arabs in Palestine erupted as the British withdrew in mid-1947. In Haifa, a 14-member National Committee (NC) was established on December 2, with al-Haj Ibrahim as its chairman. He led the committee until its disestablishment in April 1948 during the thick of the war. Nonetheless, from the beginning of hostilities in December 1947, al-Haj Ibrahim encouraged moderation and pursued a ceasefire between the Arab and Jewish paramilitary forces, declaring the "Arabs were interested in quiet in Haifa..."

Opposition with al-Husayni's policies in the city mounted with al-Haj Ibrahim threatening to leave the city along with all of its senior politicians if al-Husayni continued to order attacks against Jewish forces there. Many senior politicians, including 11 out of the 15 NC members, had already left the city despite persuasion by al-Haj Ibrahim to remain in the city and help the Arab inhabitants face Jewish irregulars. Nonetheless, he left Palestine himself in early April 1948. He did so apparently after quarreling with the Lebanese Druze commander of the Arab Liberation Army (ALA) in Haifa, Amin Izz al-Din Nabahani.

== Later life and death ==
Al-Haj Ibrahim moved to Amman, Jordan after fleeing Haifa upon its capture by Jewish forces. He wrote memoirs of his experience in Palestine from 1947 to the early 1950s. They mostly outlined the responsibility of the Palestinian leadership regarding the circumstances of the city's fall, and exposing its performance and political discourse during the British Mandate period. Al-Haj Ibrahim died in Amman in 1953, and was buried in Damascus, Syria. Palestinian historian Walid Khalidi edited and published his memoirs, titled Defending Haifa and the Problem of Palestine: The Memoirs of Rashid al-Haj Ibrahim, 1891-1953, in the Institute for Palestine Studies, Beirut, in 2006.

== Bibliography ==
- Gelber, Yoav (1997), Jewish-Transjordanian relations, 1921-48, Routledge, ISBN 0-7146-4675-X
- Khalaf, Issa (1991), Politics in Palestine: Arab factionalism and social disintegration, 1939-1948, SUNY Press, ISBN 978-0-7914-0708-0
- Matthews, Weldon C. (2006), Confronting an empire, constructing a nation: Arab nationalists and popular politics in mandate Palestine, I.B. Tauris, ISBN 1-84511-173-7
- Morris, Benny (2004), The Birth of the Palestinian Refugee Problem Revisited, Cambridge University Press, ISBN 0-521-00967-7
- Schleifer, Abdullah (2005), "Palestinian Peasantry in the Great Revolt", in Edmund Burke (ed.), Struggle and Survival in the Modern Middle East, University of California Press, ISBN 0-520-24661-6
- Yazbak, Mahmud (1998), Haifa in the late Ottoman period, 1864-1914: Muslim town in transition Volume 16 of The Ottoman Empire and its heritage, BRILL, ISBN 90-04-11051-8
