= Basheer Nafi =

Palestinian-born British researcher

Basheer Musa Nafi (Arabic: بشير نافع) is Palestinian-born, living in the United Kingdom. Nafi is a Professor of Middle East History and a Senior Researcher at Al Jazeera Centre for Studies.

== Early life ==
Nafi was born in the Rafah refugee camp in Gaza. After the 1967 war, he moved to Jordan to live with his uncle and complete high school. In 1971, Nafi moved to Egypt to study veterinary medicine. Nafi moved to the UK to undertake postgraduate study at King's College.

== Career ==
Nafi holds two PhDs, the first in microbiology from King's College, University of London (1987) and the second in political history from the University of Reading (1996). The second was published as a book in 1998, titled Arabism, Islamism and the Palestine Question, 1908-1941: A Political History.

He taught Islamic history and Islamic studies at Birkbeck College of the University of London, the Muslim College, and Markefield Institute of High Education.

== Books ==
- Arabism, Islamism and the Palestine Question, 1908–1941: A Political History, Ithaca Press, Reading, 1998.
- Imperialism, Zionism and Palestinian Nationalism (in Arabic), Cairo, Dar al-Shuruq, 1999.
- The Rise and Decline of the Arab-Islamic Reform Movement, London, ICIT Papers, 2000.
- Islamic Thought in the Twentieth Century (co-editor; in association with S. Taji-Farouki), London, I. B. Tauris, 2004.
- The Palestinian strategic Report: 2005 (co-editor; in association with Muhsin Salih; in English and Arabic), Beirut, al-Zaytouna Centre for Studies, 2006.
- Iraq: Contexts of Unity and Disintegration. A Reading in Sunnism, Shi‘ism, and the Arab Identity (in Arabic), Cairo, Dar al-Shuruq, 2006.
- The Islamists (in Arabic), Beirut, al-Dar al-‘Arabiyya, 2010.
- On the Emergence and Triumph of Ahl al-Sunna Wal-Jama'a, 2023.
