= Michael Branicky =

American computer scientist

Michael S. Branicky is a professor of electrical engineering and computer science at the University of Kansas, Lawrence, Kansas. He was named Fellow of the Institute of Electrical and Electronics Engineers (IEEE) in 2016 for contributions to switched and hybrid control systems.

== Education and career ==
Branicky obtained his B.S. (Magna Cum Laude) in Electrical Engineering from Case Western Reserve University in May 1987. He then remained in his alma mater, where he continued on studying electrical engineering and applied physics under mentorship from Wyatt S. Newman. He graduated from it in 1990, after defending his thesis which was titled Rapid Configuration Space Transforms for Real-Time Robotic Reflexes. Branicky moved to the Massachusetts Institute of Technology, where, from 1989 to 1990, he was a research fellow at its Computer Science and Artificial Intelligence Laboratory. He also studied electrical engineering and computer science under mentorship from Sanjoy K. Mitter at the same university. He graduated from it with Sc.D. in June 1995, after defending another thesis titled Studies in Hybrid Systems: Modeling, Analysis, and Control. Two years prior to it, Branicky served as research associate at NASA Ames Research Center for one month. Branicky then returned to CWRU where he served as assistant, associate, professor, and eventually chair of its Department of Electrical Engineering and Computer Science. While promoting from one position to another, Branicky also held a visiting professor post at the Faculty of Engineering (LTH), Lund University, where he previously served as postdoctoral research scientist.
