= John Henry Kerr =

Sir John Henry Kerr KCSI KCIE (31 May 1871 – 8 April 1934) was a colonial governor in British India

== Life ==
John Henry Kerr was born in Glasgow, Lanarkshire, Scotland, the elder son (with three daughters), of John Smith Kerr, tea and sugar merchant of Greenock, and his wife, Sarah Ann Bray, elder daughter of Tom Cox Bray, an early settler of Adelaide, South Australia.

Kerr was educated first by Messrs Wren and Gurney, later going to the Glasgow Academy (1885-1887). He attended the University of Glasgow from 1886 to 1888, and in 1890 matriculated at Clare College, Cambridge.

Kerr joined the Indian Civil Service in 1892. He was settlement officer, Bihar (1899); collector of Midnapore (1904); Director of Land Records, Bengal (1905); Deputy Secretary to the Government of India (1907); Revenue Secretary to the Government of India (1911); Chief Secretary to the Government of Bengal (1915); (Finance) member of Lord Zetland's Bengal Executive Council (1921-1922); Governor of Assam (1922-1927); acting Governor of Bengal (1925); Deputy Chairman of the Indian Franchise Committee (1932); retired (193-); "in retirement [he] continued [to be] an esteemed counsellor on Indian Affairs"; publications: Settlement Reports of Saran, and Darbanga; joint-editor, "Rampini's Bengal Tenancy Act".

Sir John was awarded the honours, C.I.E. (1911) and C.S.I (1917). He was created a Knight Commander of the Most Eminent Order of the Indian Empire (1922), and a Knight Commander of the Most Exalted Order of the Star of India (1922).

His club was the East India United Services. In retirement, he lived at Fairstead, Latchmoor avenue, Gerrards Cross, Buckinghamshire, England, and at Orcadia, Kilmacolm, Renfrewshire, Scotland.

He married on 28 January 1898 at Christ Church, Muzaffarpur, Tirhut, Bihar, India, Minnie Julia Wilson, later Lady Kerr, youngest daughter of James Minden Wilson, and Janet McKenzie, of Muzaffarpur, Tirhut, Bihar, India, and granddaughter of the Honourable James Wilson, Chief Judge of Mauritius. They had two sons, the elder of whom, John Minden Kerr, was a brigadier in the British army, and two daughters, the younger of whom was the maternal grandmother of David Russell, classical guitarist.

Sir John died on 8 April 1934 at his residence in Gerrards Cross and was buried in the cemetery at Chalfont St Peter. He was survived by Lady Kerr until January 1957. See obituaries in the London Times

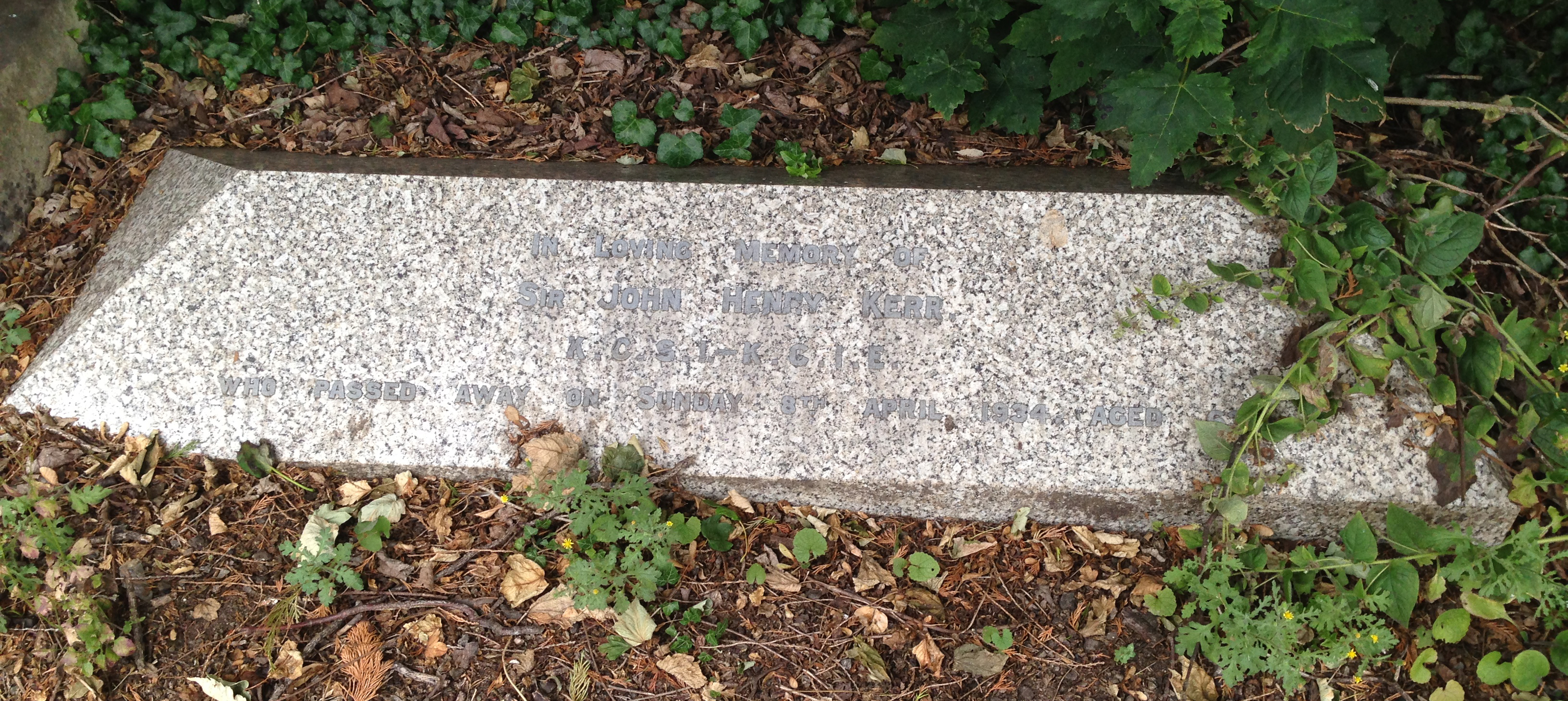
Kerr's Grave in Chalfont St Peter

Government offices
| Preceded by Sir William Sinclair Marris | Governor of Assam; 1922–1927 | Succeeded by Sir Egbert Laurie Lucas Hammond |
