= Ocone =

Ocone is an Italian surname. Notable people with the surname include:

- Daniel Ocone (born 1953), American mathematician
- Lucia Ocone (born 1974), Italian actress
- Raffaella Ocone (fl. 1991), Italian chemical engineer
