= Sanjoy K. Mitter =

Electrical engineer (1933–2023)

Sanjoy Kumar Mitter
- Born: December 9, 1933; Calcutta, India
- Died: June 26, 2023 (aged 89); Cambridge, Massachusetts, USA
- Education: University of Calcutta; City and Guilds of London Institute; Imperial College London
- Relatives: Binod Mitter (grandfather)
- Awards: Richard E. Bellman Control Heritage Award (2007)
- Scientific career
- Workplaces: Brown, Boveri & Cie; Battelle Memorial Institute; Central Electricity Generating Board; Case Western Reserve University; MIT
- Thesis: Function Space Methods in Optimal Control with Applications to Power Systems (1965)
- Doctoral advisor: John Hugh Westcott
- Doctoral students: Rosalind Picard; Sanjeev Kulkarni; Daniel Ocone
- Website: stuff.mit.edu/people/mitter/

Sanjoy Kumar Mitter (December 9, 1933 – June 26, 2023) was a Professor in the Department of Electrical Engineering and Computer Science at MIT who was a noted control theorist.

== Life and career ==
Mitter was born in 1933 in Calcutta, India, to a distinguished legal family, being the great-grandson and grandson of Romesh Chandra Mitra (or Mitter) and Binod Mitter respectively. He received a B.Sc. in mathematics from the University of Calcutta, and a B.Sc. in Engineering at City and Guilds of London Institute. He continued his studies in the United Kingdom and Ph.D. from Imperial College of Science and Technology, London. After graduation, he worked at Brown, Boveri & Cie, the Battelle Memorial Institute, and the Central Electricity Generating Board before joining Case Western Reserve University (CWRU) in 1965 as an assistant professor. Mitter became an associate professor at CWRU in 1967 and moved to MIT in 1969. He became a professor of electrical engineering at MIT in 1973. At MIT, he was director for both the Center for Intelligent Control and the Laboratory for Information and Decision Systems.

Mitter's research is concerned with Systems, Control and Communication. He has furnished proofs in nonlinear filtering and optimal control theory, as well as carrying out more applied work in image analysis, computation of optimal controls and reliability of electrical power systems.

Mitter lived in Cambridge, Massachusetts. He died in June 2023.

== Honors and awards ==
Mitter received both the Richard E. Bellman Control Heritage Award from the American Automatic Control Council (2007) and the IEEE Control Systems Award (in 2000). In 1988 he was elected a member of the National Academy of Engineering "for outstanding contributions to the theory and applications of automatic control and nonlinear filtering".
