= John Ackroyd Woodhead =

Sir John Ackroyd Woodhead (1881 –1973) was a British colonial administrator, member of the Indian Civil Service, and Governor of Bengal. He was the head of the Woodhead Commission (officially the Palestine Partition Commission).

== Early life ==
Woodhead was born on 19 June 1881. He was the son of the late Samuel Woodhead of Springbank, Burley-in-Wharfedale, Yorkshire. He was educated at Bradford Grammar School and Clare College, Cambridge. He joined the Indian Civil Service in 1904 and served as an Assistant Magistrate.

== Career ==
Woodhead served in the government of Bengal, including as Finance Member of the Executive Council of Bengal from 1932, and briefly served as Acting Governor of Bengal in 1934. He served as government in absence of the governor, Sir John Anderson. He was appointed a Knight Commander of the Order of the Star of India (KCSI), and the Companion of the Order of the Indian Empire (CIE) in recognition of his service in the administration of British India.

In March 1938, Woodhead was appointed chairman of the Palestine Partition Commission, established by the British government to examine the practical possibilities of partitioning Mandatory Palestine. The commission considered proposed boundaries for Arab and Jewish states, as well as the economic, financial, and administrative implications of partition. It began its work in Britain in March 1938 and subsequently travelled to Palestine. The commission stated in its report that the partition of Palestine would be impractical.

In 1939, Woodhead was appointed Advisor to the Secretary of State for India.

== Death ==
Woodhead died on 9 January 1973.
