= Bloudan Conference of 1937 =

International Arab conference

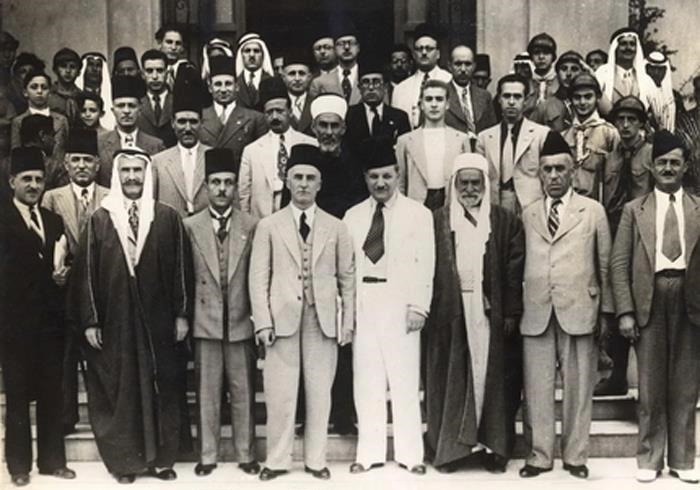
Front row from left to right: Unknown delegate, Ex-minister Mohammed Alluba Pasha of Egypt, Palestinian-Egyptian journalist Mohamed Ali Eltaher, Syrian nationalist Ihsan al-Jabiri, future Lebanese prime minister Riad al-Solh, Ali Obeid of Syria, Sa'id al-Hajj Thabet of Iraq, and Hamad Sa'b of Lebanon; second row: Mufti Sheikh Adib El Khaldi (Mufti Jenin).

The Bloudan Conference of 1937 (Arabic transliteration: al-Mu'tamar al-'Arabi al-Qawmi fi Bludan) was the first pan-Arab summit held in Bloudan, Syria on 8 September 1937. The second Bloudan conference was held nine years later in 1946.

It was called by the Arab Higher Committee in response to the Peel Commission which recommended the partition of Palestine, then under British control, into Arab and Jewish states. The Peel Commission's recommendations were rejected by the participating delegates while the 1936–39 Arab revolt in Palestine was ongoing against the British authorities who supported and increased Jewish immigration in Palestine. The Bloudan Conference held historical significance for being an early display of collective Arab concern regarding the Zionist movement.

== Goals and participation ==
The Arab Higher Committee originally petitioned the British Mandate administration to hold the conference in Jerusalem, but the request was rejected and the small town of Bloudan was chosen instead. The conference, which gathered hundreds of delegates from the Arab world (mostly the eastern half), was orchestrated "in order to study the duties of the Arabs in their respective countries and to agree on effective measures to resist the dangers posed by the Zionists."

Several resolutions adopted during the conference rejected both the plan to partition Palestine and the establishment of a Jewish state there. Furthermore, it affirmed that Palestine was an integral part of the Arab world. A number of committees were created to research ways to resist partition. The significance of the Bloudan Conference was the demonstration of pan-Arab support for the anti-Zionist movement in Palestine.

It was chaired by Naji al-Suwaidi, the former prime minister of Iraq, and vice-chaired by intellectual Shakib Arslan of Lebanon, former education minister Mohammed Alluba Pasha of Egypt and the Greek Orthodox bishop of Homs, Ali Hurayki. Although the government of Syria did not participate at an official level due to Anglo-French pressure, it was the most represented in the conference with 115 delegates. Palestine was represented by 97 delegates, Lebanon by 59 and led by Riad al-Solh, Transjordan by 29, Iraq by 9, Egypt by 2 and Tripolitania by 1. In a sign of further pan-Arab support for the conference, solidarity messages and telegrams were sent by Ahmad al-Sabah, the Emir of Kuwait and by Islamic-oriented groups from several Egyptian cities and towns, as well as from Tunisia, Algeria and Morocco.

After the official conference in Bloudan, a largely secret meeting was held in Damascus by more activist delegates called the Conference of Nationalist Youth. The meeting called for stronger action to unite Arab youth and preparatory committee was established to organize a second, larger conference to be held in Europe. Participants included Yunus al-Sab'awi, Kazem al-Solh, Taqi al-Din Solh, Farid Zayn al-Din, Wasfi Kamal, Munir al-Rayyes, Uthman al-Hawrani, Farhan Shubaylat, Akram Zuaiter and Sabri al-Asali.

A pamphlet distributed at the conference, entitled "Islam and Jewry," has been described as history's "first text that propagated sheer Jew-hatred in an Islamic context by mixing selected anti-Jewish episodes of Mohammed’s life with the so-called wickedness of Jews in the 20th century".

== Reactions ==
The French Mandate government of Lebanon opposed Lebanese participation in the conference, with the pro-government newspaper stating it was in the country's interests not to antagonize the Jews or the Arabs alike. Lebanese delegates at the conference favored a resolution condemning Lebanese neutrality in the conflict in Palestine, but the resolution was rejected because of opposition from many Syrian delegates and al-Suwaidi who feared a rift with the Lebanese government.

The British Consulate in Damascus released a statement reflecting British alarm over the summit, saying there was "little doubt that the long drawn-out deliberations over Palestine are reviving from the ashes of local jealousies: the pan-Arab phoenix." The consul described "Islam and Jewry," which was distributed at the conference, as "a startlingly inflammatory pamphlet" which he said gave "an indication of the passions that the organizers of the congress hoped to arouse. The consul's informant at the conference described the text as "a violently anti-Jewish pamphlet" which was given to each of the persons attending the Bludan Congress.

Fu'ad Mufarrij, a leading delegate at the meeting, believed the Bloudan Conference was an expression of the aspirations and goals of the Arabs as well as a major step to further develop programs to achieve those aims. However, Lebanese historian Raghid al-Solh believed the Bloudan Conference and other pan-Arab conferences held after it during the late 1930s, focused specifically on the Palestine issue and only sought to consolidate the political status quo in the region in which Iraq and Transjordan leaned towards the Hashemite vision of a limited federal Arab union, an idea the British sympathized with, while Syria, Lebanon and Egypt each held their own initiatives. According to al-Solh, pan-Arab unity and liberation from European colonialism were largely ignored.

== Bibliography ==
- Commins, David Dean (2004), Historical Dictionary of Syria, Scarecrow Press, ISBN 0810849348
- Mattar, Phillip (2005), Encyclopedia of the Palestinians, Infobase Publishing, ISBN 0816057648, archived from the original on 2012-08-05
- Sulh, Raghid (2004), Lebanon and Arabism: National Identity and State Formation, I.B. Tauris, ISBN 1860640516
