= Anderson executive council of Bengal =

An executive council of British India's Bengal Presidency

John Anderson's Executive Council
- 45th Cabinet of Bengal Presidency
- 1932–1937
- Date formed: 29 March 1932
- Date dissolved: 1 April 1937

People and organisations
- Head of state: George V
- Head of government: John Anderson
- No. of ministers: 8
- Ministers removed: 7
- Total no. of members: 15

History
- Election: 1929
- Outgoing election: 1923
- Predecessor: Jackson
- Successor: Huq I

The Anderson executive council was an executive council of British India's Bengal Presidency, one of four cabinet established as per Government of India Act 1935. It was formed in 1932 under the leadership of the provincial governor John Anderson and remained in office until 1937, when it was succeeded by the First Huq ministry.

In 1933, several members at a session of Bengal Legislative Council proposed to reduce the members of the executive council.

== Members ==
The members of the Executive Council are listed below:

Name	Office	Assumed office	Left office	Notes
John Anderson	President (Governor)	29 March 1932	1 April 1937	
John Ackroyd Woodhead	Vice-president	7 April 1932	1 April 1937	
Alexander Marr	Vice-president	8 October 1927		
Provash Chunder Mitter	Vice-president			
Khwaja Nazimuddin	Member	9 May 1934	1 April 1937	
Robert Neil Reid	Member	20 January 1934	1 April 1937	
Brajendra Lal Mitter	Member	4 May 1934	1 April 1937	
Provash Chunder Mitter	Member	31 July 1928		
Abdul Karim Ghaznavi	Member	22 April 1929		
William David Russell Prentice	Member	28 April 1930		
John Ackroyd Woodhead	Member			
Kazi Golam Mohiuddin Faroqui	Minister	18 December 1929	1 April 1937	
Bijoy Prasad Singh Roy	Minister	15 November 1930	1 April 1937	
Azizul Huq	Minister	15 June 1934	1 April 1937	
Khwaja Nazimuddin	Minister	18 December 1929		
