= Hamad Sa'b =

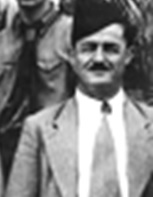
- Sa'b at Bloudan Conference, 1937
- Born: 21 April 1892; Kahlouniyeh, Mutasarrifate of Mount Lebanon, Ottoman Empire
- Died: 25 July 1941 (aged 49); Kingdom of Iraq
- Known for: Participant in Great Syrian Revolt; Commander of Lebanese volunteers in 1936-1939 Arab revolt in Palestine

Hamad Sa'b (surname also spelled Saab or Sa'ab, Arabic: حمد صعب) (21 April 1892 - 25 July 1941) was an Arab nationalist rebel commander from Lebanon. He was born to a Druze family in Kahlouniyeh in the Chouf region of the Mutasarrifate of Mount Lebanon during the Ottoman era. He took part in the Great Syrian Revolt against French rule in 1925-27.

== Military career ==
During the 1936-1939 Arab revolt in Palestine, Sa'b led a contingent of some 30 Lebanese volunteers, mostly Druze, to aid local rebels fighting against British rule and the growing Zionist movement. Sa'b and all of the volunteer contingents from the Arab world were under the overall command of Fawzi al-Qawuqji, a Syrian anti-colonialist rebel leader. Much of Sa'b's activity was centered in northern Palestine, particularly around the village of Bal'a, where his rebels fought a battle against British forces on 3 September 1936, in which two Druze volunteers were killed, including Mahmud Abu Yahya, a well-known rebel from the Great Syrian Revolt.

In 1941, Sa'b died fighting the British Army in Iraq. The vehicle he was traveling had been bombed by British forces, and according to local accounts, Sa'b died protecting al-Qawuqji who was also in the vehicle.

== Bibliography ==
- Artzi, Pinhas (1978), Bar-Ilan Studies in History: Confrontation and Coexistence, Bar-Ilan University Press, ISBN 9789652260499
- Parsons, Laila (2015), "Rebels Without Borders: Southern Syria and Palestine, 1919-1936", in Cyrus Schayegh (ed.), The Routledge Handbook of the History of the Middle East Mandates, Routledge, ISBN 9781317497066
- Swayd, Sami S. (2009), The A to Z of the Druzes, Rowman & Littlefield, ISBN 9780810868366
