= Brajendra Lal Mitter =

Brajendra Lal Mitter, also known as BL Mitter, was a Bengali British Indian Politician, legal expert, and former acting Governor of West Bengal.

== Career ==
After passing his Bar at Law, Mitter practiced at the Calcutta High Court.

From 1925 to 1928, Mitter served as the Advocate-General of Bengal. He was a Law Member of the Government of India from 1928 to 1934. He was a Member of the Bengal Executive Council from 1934 to 1937 and the Advocate General of India from 1937 to 1945. He was the Dewan of Baroda State from 1945 to 1947. He was the acting Governor of West Bengal in 1947.

Mitter made some initial contribution to the Constitution of India before withdrawing due to health reasons. He worked on the integration of the princely states into India. He was replaced by Madhav Rao.
