= Woodhead Commission =

1938 British commission on Palestine

The Woodhead Commission (officially the Palestine Partition Commission) was a British technical commission established to propose "a detailed" partition scheme for Mandatory Palestine, including recommending the partition boundaries and examination of economic and financial aspects of the Peel Plan.

The Commission was appointed at the end of February 1938 and conducted its investigations from April to early August 1938. It concluded that the Peel plan was impracticable, citing difficulties related to the proposed transfer of population, mostly of Arabs, as well as administrative and financial concerns. It considered alternative schemes and favored a modified partition that retained Galilee and a corridor from Jaffa to Jerusalem under British mandate, but noted that such an arrangement would require substantial financial support to be viable.

It published its conclusions on November 9, 1938, after which the British government rejected the imminent partition of Palestine as involving insurmountable "political, administrative and financial difficulties". Britain called for a conference in London for all relevant parties to work out a compromise.

== Overview ==
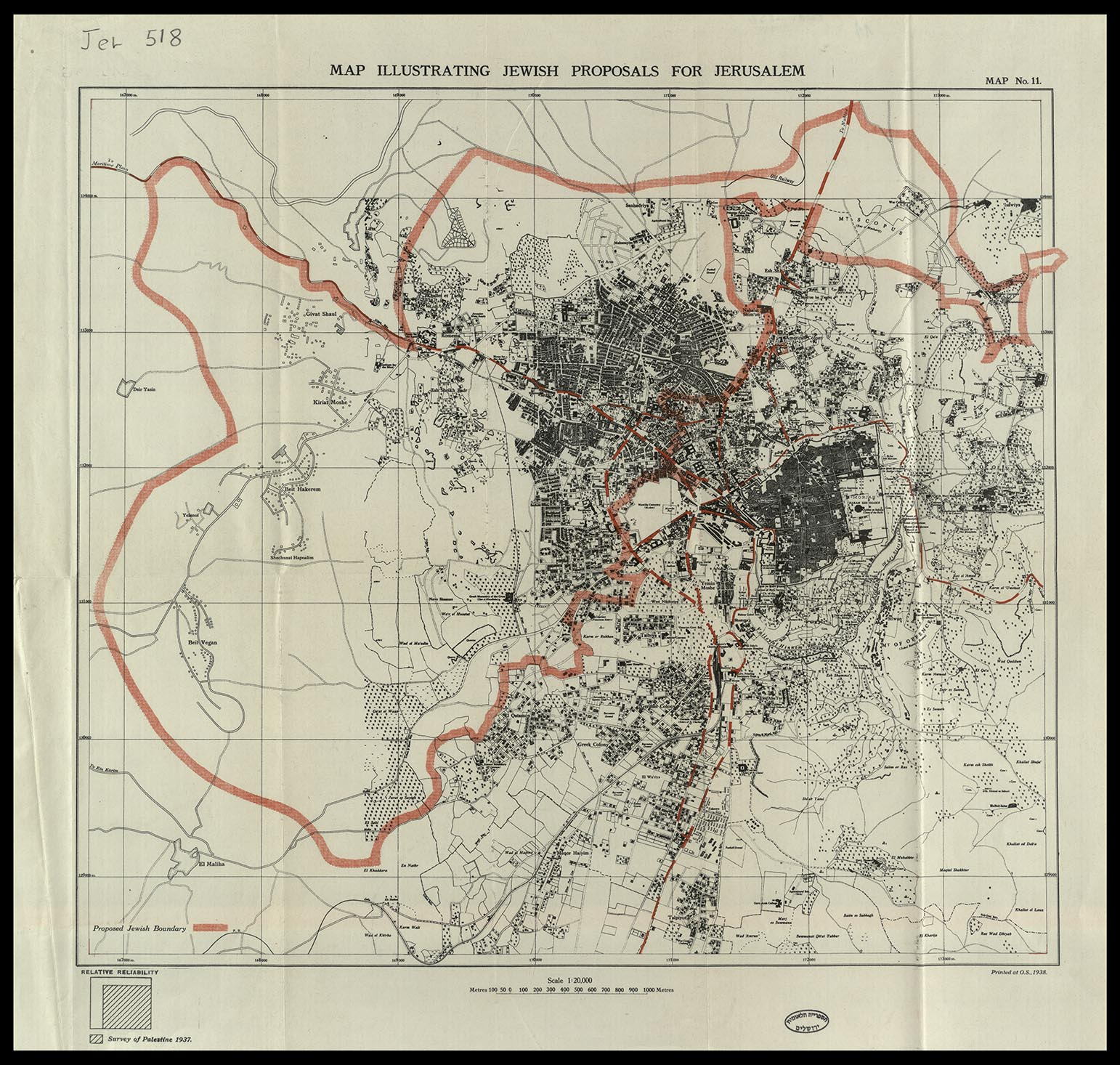
Map illustrating Jewish proposals for partition of Jerusalem, presented to the Woodhead Commission

The Arabs renewed their revolt after the publication of the Peel Commission report and the British Cabinet, taking fright, secretly voted against partition on 8 December 1937. The Woodhead commission was appointed with a formal duty of implementation of the Peel proposals but in reality to bury them. The Commission comprised Sir John Woodhead, a former civil administrator in India; Sir Alison Russell, a lawyer; Percival Waterfield and Thomas Reid, also Indian civil servants. It was charged with examining the Peel Commission plan in detail, in order "to recommend boundaries for the proposed Arab and Jewish areas and the enclaves to be retained permanently or temporarily under British Mandate" and "to examine and report on the economic and financial questions involved in partition upon which decisions will require to be taken." However, the appointment of the Commission was regarded by the Colonial Office as an instrument to free Britain from its obligation to the partition plan. In accordance with a decision of the British cabinet, Woodhead was secretly advised that it was within the commission's authority to decide that "no workable scheme could be produced". Sir George Rendel, head of the Eastern Department of the Foreign Office, did his utmost to ensure that the Commission would reach the "correct conclusion," by trying to influence the choice of personnel and placing his own memorandum before the Commission as evidence.

The Commission spent over three months in Palestine, taking evidence from witnesses in 55 sessions. No Arabs came forward to submit evidence, though King Abdullah of Transjordan wrote to Woodhead giving support for partition as well as receiving the Commission in Amman.

The Commission found that a self-supporting Arab State could only be established if it "contained a large number of Jews, whose contributions to tax-revenue would alone enable that state to balance its budget." As the Arab State would need the mandated territories for farming and the Jewish State would need them for industry, the Commission proposed a customs union.

In their report, they examined three possible modifications of the Peel Commission proposal, which they called Plans A, B and C. These plans proposed the creation of a Jewish state surrounded by a larger Arab state and a British zone. The three plans are as follows:

=== Plan A ===
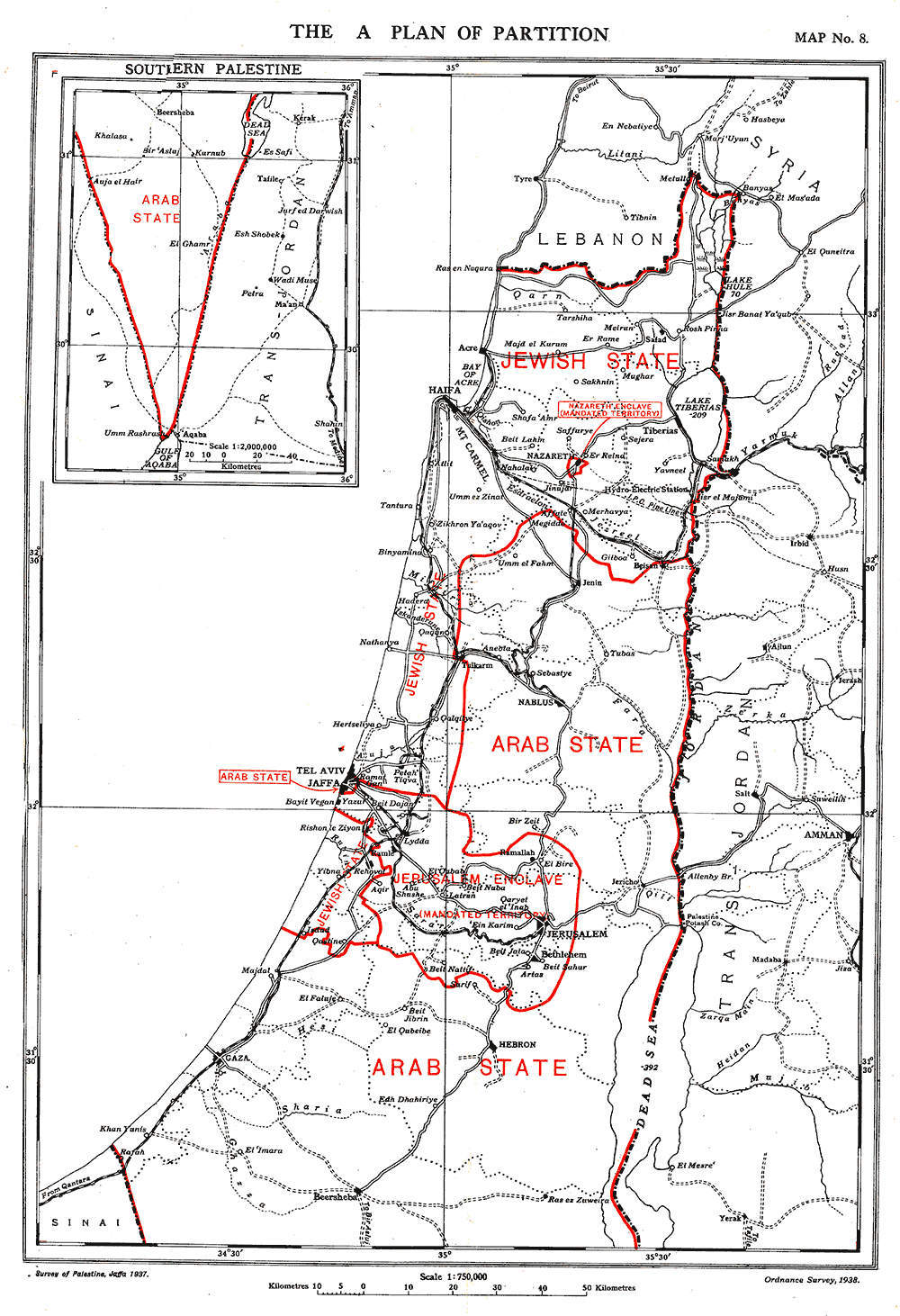
Woodhead Commission, Plan A

Plan A, was based on the Peel Plan, with the boundaries redrawn "more exactly, taking their outline as a guide". It proposed a coastal Jewish state, a British-mandated corridor from Jerusalem to the coastal city Jaffa, and the remainder of Palestine merged with Transjordan into an Arab state. Jaffa (without Tel Aviv) was included in the mandated corridor in the Peel Plan but in the Arab state in Plan A. Under Plan A, it was estimated that the Arab state would have 7,200 Jews and 485,200 Arabs, and the Jewish state would have 304,900 Jews and 294,700 Arabs.

=== Plan B ===
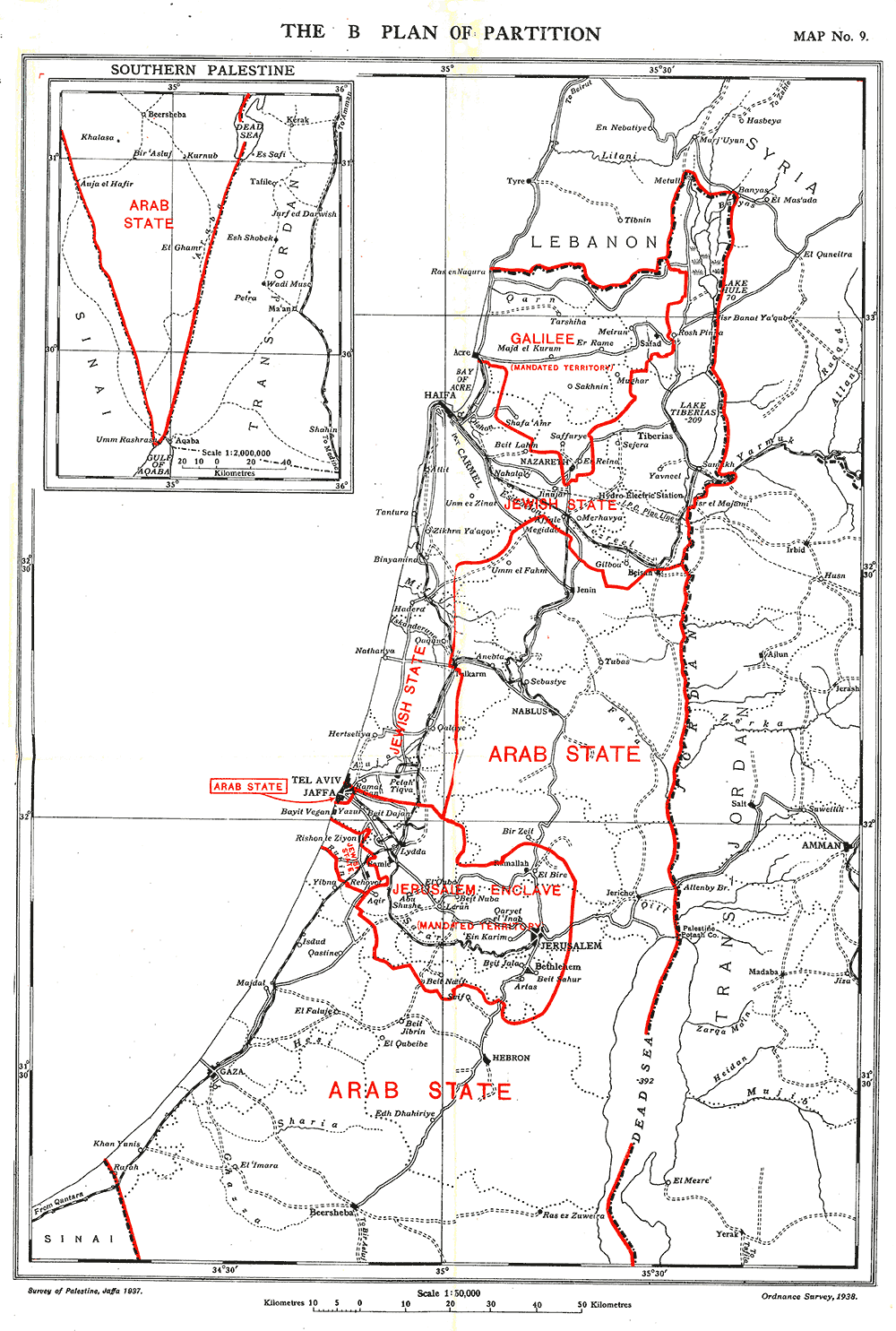
Woodhead Commission, Plan B

Plan B, the same as Plan A, except that it reduced the size of the Jewish State by adding Galilee to the permanently mandated area and the southern part of the region south of Jaffa to the Arab State. Under Plan B, the Jewish state would have 300,400 Jews and 188,400 Arabs (50,000 in the Haifa district), while 90,000 Arabs and 76,000 Jews would continue to live under British rule.

=== Plan C ===
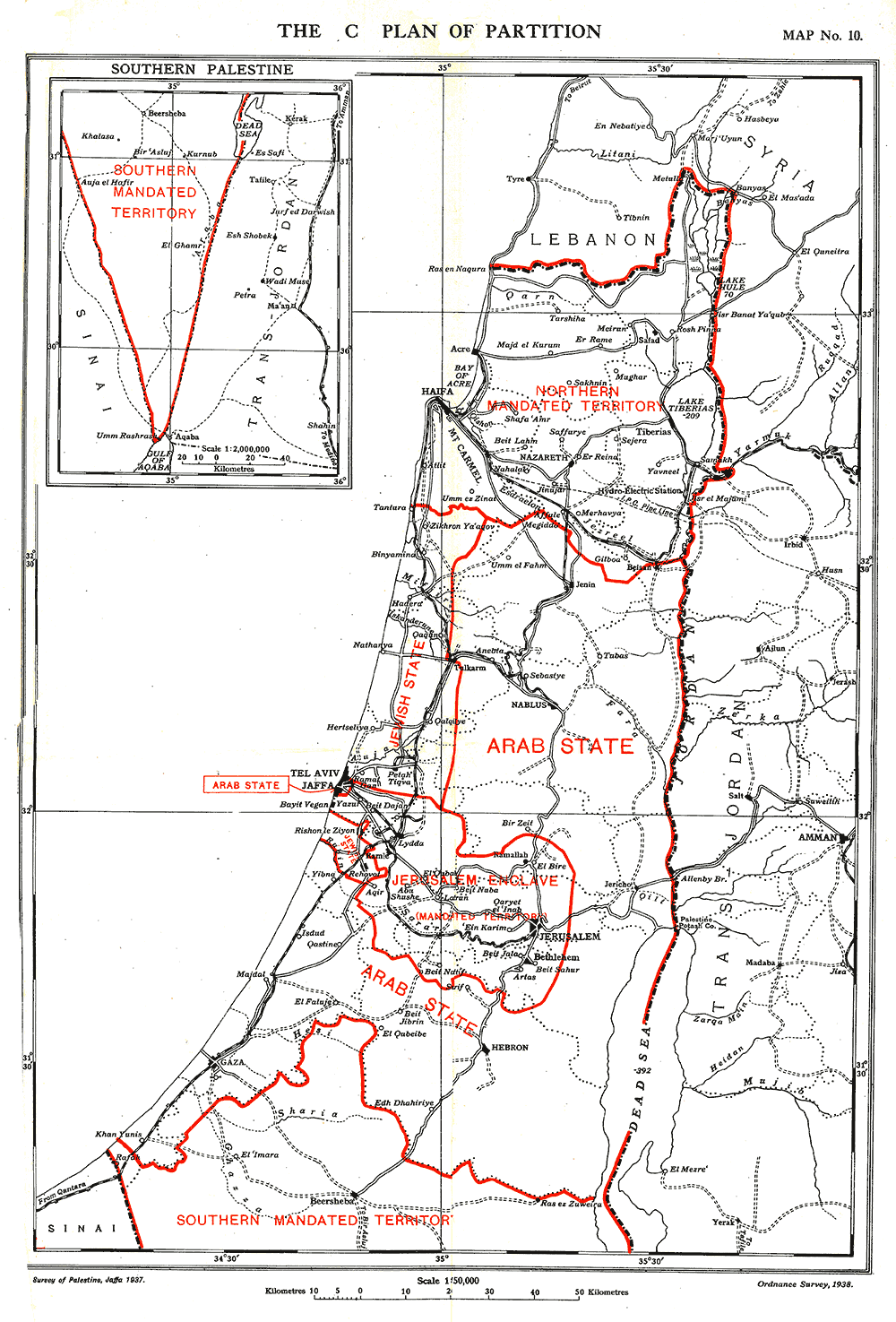
Woodhead Commission, Plan C

Plan C, a further modification, would reduce the Jewish State to the coastal region between Zikhron Yaakov and Rehovot, while placing northern Palestine, including the Jezreel Valley, and all the semi-arid part of southern Palestine, under a separate mandate to be administered by the mandatory until the Arab and Jewish populations could agree on their final destination. An essential feature of the plan was a customs union of the Arab State, the Jewish State and the territories under Mandate.

Plan C recommended:

- A Jewish state of 1,258 square km, in two parts: The northern part would be a coastal strip 15–20 km wide from Tel Aviv to above Zichron Ya'acov, and the southern part would be a smaller region including Rehovot. The initial population would be about 226,000 Jews and 54,400 Arabs.
- An Arab state of 7,393 square km, consisting mostly of a segment approximating today's West Bank and Gaza Strip with a wide corridor connecting them. The Arab state would also include the city of Jaffa. The initial population would be 8,900 Jews and 444,100 Arabs.
- Three mandated territories under British control: all of the Galilee (initial population 77,300 Jews and 231,400 Arabs), an enclave including Jerusalem and Lydda (initial population 80,100 Jews and 211,400 Arabs), and the Negev region from north of Beersheva (initially 60,000 Arabs).

== Conclusions ==
The commission report was published on 9, November 1938, concluded that no plan of partition could be evolved within the terms of reference which would, in the view of the members of the Commission, offer much hope of success, for eventual establishment of self-supporting Arab and Jewish states. However, the commission devised possible alternative plans.

The commission rejected Plan A, which was the Commission's interpretation of the Peel Plan, mainly on the grounds that it required a large transfer of Arabs to reduce the number of Arabs in the proposed Jewish state. However, the British government had already rejected Peel's suggestion that the transfer be compulsory, and the Commission considered that a voluntary transfer was also not expected to occur because of the Arab population's "deep attachment to the land". In addition, development difficulties for the Arabs were expected. Second, the inclusion of Galilee in the Jewish state was considered undesirable as "the population is almost entirely Arab", the Arabs living there were likely to resist the inclusion by force, and the option would create a "minority problem" that threatened regional stability.

Plan B was rejected but one member favored it. The problem of Galilee was considered fatal to Plan B. Including it in the Arab state would create a major security problem for the Jewish state, while keeping it indefinitely under mandate would deprive the large Arab population of its right to independence. Major problems were also seen with the disposition of Haifa, whose population was approximately half Jewish, and the part of Palestine running from Haifa to Beisan and then north to the frontier.

Plan C was preferred by the commission. This plan was a modification of the partition, which would form a satisfactory basis of settlement, if the United Kingdom was prepared to provide a sufficient assistance to enable the Arab State to balance its budget. In this plan, the entire Galilee and a corridor from Jaffa to Jerusalem would remain under British mandate.

Two members of the Commission also added Notes of Reservation. Russell argued that Plan B was preferred to Plan C, being more in accord with the Peel Commission's plan, more likely to secure peace, and more equitable and practical. Reid argued that all three plans were fatally flawed.

=== Economy and finance ===
The Commission also declared that there were financial and economic difficulties "of such a nature that we can find no possible way to overcome them within our terms of reference." It found that "it is not possible, under our terms of reference, to recommend boundaries which will afford a reasonable prospect of the eventual establishment of a self-supporting Arab State. This conclusion is, in our opinion, equally valid under plan C, plan B, and any other plan of partition which does not involve the inclusion in the Arab State of an area containing a large number of Jews, whose contributions to tax-revenue would alone enable that state to balance its budget". They suggested that the Arab and Jewish states not be given fiscal independence but instead the UK government accept "the very considerable financial liability" and provide a sufficient assistance to enable the Arab State to balance its budget.

In a published summary his findings, Woodhead identified two reasons for the financial infeasibility of an Arab state. First, Jewish citizens of Palestine made much higher per capita tax contribution than Arabs, yet any feasible partition would leave few Jews in the Arab state. Second, the greater part of the Arab wealth lay in the places that would become part of the Jewish state due to their large Jewish populations. For example, although Arabs and Jews had about the same amount of land under citrus cultivation, less than one third of the Arab holding would be in the Arab state."

The Commission proposed a modified form of partition called "economic federalism" in which the two states would enter into a customs union with the territories that remained under mandate, leaving the Mandatory authorities to determine a fiscal policy. According to the report: "The customs revenue would be collected by the Mandatory, and the net surplus after meeting certain common charges would be distributed between the three areas according to an agreed formula, subject to periodic review...The Commission suggest that initially each area's share should be one-third...To enable the Arab State to balance its budget without subjecting it to external financial control, it should receive a supplementary share out of the share of the mandated territories, under conditions which will entitle it to share in the expansion of customs revenue resulting from an increase of prosperity in the rest of Palestine. This arrangement could be extended, if desired, to cover internal communications (railways, posts and telegraphs) thus removing certain obvious administrative difficulties consequent on partition. While this arrangement withholds fiscal autonomy from the Arab and Jewish states it seems to the Commission, subject to certain reservations, to form a satisfactory basis for settlement, provided his Majesty's Government are prepared to accept the considerable financial liability involved", in order to balance the Arab state budget.

== Criticism ==
Former Colonial Secretary Leo Amery argued that partition had been rejected "for the wrong reasons." He said that the Peel Plan based its proposal on areas where "Jews and Arabs already preponderated," while fulfilling the Mandate required providing the Jews with sufficient territory for substantial immigration. The attempt of the Woodhead Commission to include the fewest Arabs in Jewish areas and vice versa led to plans that were not viable. Moreover, the implication was that a self-supporting Arab state must "continue to enjoy those amenities that Jewish enterprise and taxation had brought to undivided Palestine." According to Amery, no scheme could be implemented under such assumptions.

== Aftermath ==
The report of the Woodhead commission was presented to Parliament and published on November 9, 1938. As a consequence, the government issued a policy statement that "the political, administrative and financial difficulties involved in the proposal to create independent Arab and Jewish States inside Palestine are so great that this solution of the problem is impracticable."

The Jewish Agency Executive responded that the Woodhead report could not "serve as the basis for any negotiations, either between the Jews and the Arabs or between the Jewish Agency and the [British] government."

Despite Britain's announcement that the plan was impracticable, it suggested that Arab-Jewish agreement might still be possible. In 1939 London invited the Palestine Arabs, the neighboring Arab states and the Jewish Agency to London to participate in a third attempt to resolve the crisis, the St. James Conference (also known as the Round Table Conference of 1939). The recommendations were eventually rejected by both Jews and Arabs.

As was the Peel Commission, this commission was also recorded in secret by the Jewish Agency.
