= Provash Chunder Mitter =

Indian politician and lawyer

Provash Chunder Mitter was a Bengali Indian politician and lawyer.

== Early life ==
Mitter's father was Justice Romesh Chandra Mitra.

== Career ==
In 1913, Mitter published his book titled The Question of Judicial and Executive Separation and the Better Training of Judicial Officers. He was a member of the Bengal Executive Council in charge of the Department of Revenue.

From 1921 to 1924, Mitter was the Minister of Education of Bengal. In 1924, Mitter joined the Calcutta High Court as an advocate. From 1927 to 1928, he was the Minister of Local Self Government, Public Health, Agriculture, and Public Work. He was a delegate of Zamindars in the Bengal Legislative Assembly.

Mitter was appointed a Companion of the Order of the Indian Empire (CIE) in the 1919 New Year Honours,, a knight bachelor in the 1924 Birthday Honours, and a Knight Commander of the Order of the Star of India (KCSI) in the 1933 New Year Honours.

== Death ==
Mitter died on 9 February 1934 from a heart attack in Kolkata at the age of 59.
