= Integration by parts operator =

Linear operator used to formulate integration by parts formulae

In mathematics, an integration by parts operator is a linear operator used to formulate integration by parts formulae; the most interesting examples of integration by parts operators occur in infinite-dimensional settings and find uses in stochastic analysis and its applications.

== Definition ==
Let E be a Banach space such that both E and its continuous dual space E^{∗} are separable spaces; let μ be a Borel measure on E. Let S be any (fixed) subset of the class of functions defined on E. A linear operator A : S → L^{2}(E, μ; R) is said to be an integration by parts operator for μ if

$$\int_{E} \mathrm{D} \varphi(x) h(x) \, \mathrm{d} \mu(x) = \int_{E} \varphi(x) (A h)(x) \, \mathrm{d} \mu(x)$$

for every C^{1} function φ : E → R and all h ∈ S for which either side of the above equality makes sense. In the above, Dφ(x) denotes the Fréchet derivative of φ at x.

== Examples ==
- Consider an abstract Wiener space i : H → E with abstract Wiener measure γ. Take S to be the set of all C^{1} functions from E into E^{∗}; E^{∗} can be thought of as a subspace of E in view of the inclusions

$$E^{*} \xrightarrow{i^{*}} H^{*} \cong H \xrightarrow{i} E.$$

For h ∈ S, define Ah by

$$(A h)(x) = h(x) x - \mathrm{trace}_{H} \mathrm{D} h(x).$$

This operator A is an integration by parts operator, also known as the divergence operator; a proof can be found in Elworthy (1974).

- The classical Wiener space C_{0} of continuous paths in R^{n} starting at zero and defined on the unit interval [0, 1] has another integration by parts operator. Let S be the collection

$$S = \left\{ \left. h \colon C_{0} \to L_{0}^{2, 1} \right| h \mbox{ is bounded and non-anticipating} \right\},$$

i.e., all bounded, adapted processes with absolutely continuous sample paths. Let φ : C_{0} → R be any C^{1} function such that both φ and Dφ are bounded. For h ∈ S and λ ∈ R, the Girsanov theorem implies that

$$\int_{C_{0}} \varphi (x + \lambda h(x)) \, \mathrm{d} \gamma(x) = \int_{C_{0}} \varphi(x) \exp \left( \lambda \int_{0}^{1} \dot{h}_{s} \cdot \mathrm{d} x_{s} - \frac{\lambda^{2}}{2} \int_{0}^{1} | \dot{h}_{s} |^{2} \, \mathrm{d} s \right) \, \mathrm{d} \gamma(x).$$

Differentiating with respect to λ and setting λ = 0 gives

$$\int_{C_{0}} \mathrm{D} \varphi(x) h(x) \, \mathrm{d} \gamma(x) = \int_{C_{0}} \varphi(x) (A h) (x) \, \mathrm{d} \gamma(x),$$

where (Ah)(x) is the Itō integral

$$\int_{0}^{1} \dot{h}_{s} \cdot \mathrm{d} x_{s}.$$

The same relation holds for more general φ by an approximation argument; thus, the Itō integral is an integration by parts operator and can be seen as an infinite-dimensional divergence operator. This is the same result as the integration by parts formula derived from the Clark-Ocone theorem.
