= Peel Commission =

1936–1937 British investigation in Mandatory Palestine

Report of the Palestine Royal Commission
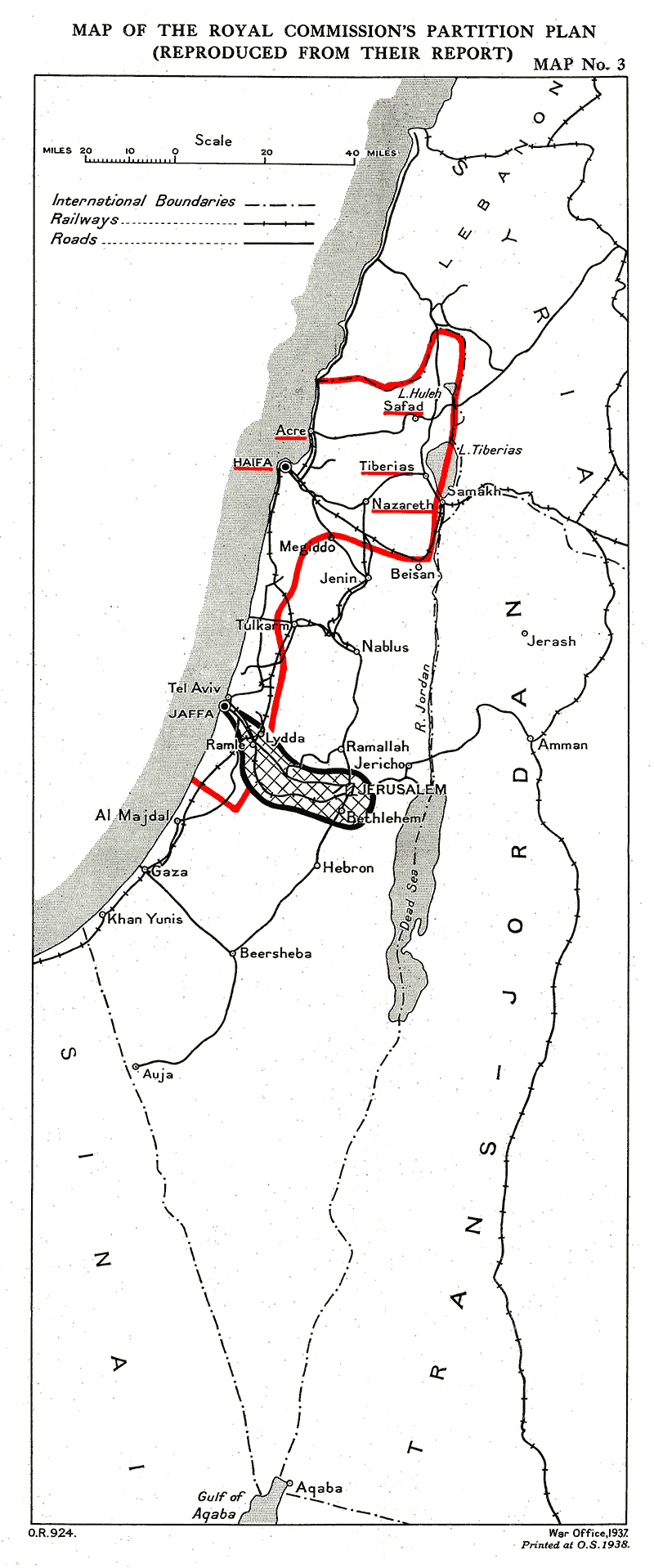
- Peel Commission Partition Plan, July 1937. Areas enclosed within the red line were part of the proposed Jewish state. The black line with hatched area represents an "enclave" (or "corridor") that was proposed as an international zone to remain under British control and administration, in recognition of Jerusalem's religious and historical importance to Christians, Jews, and Muslims.
- Created: July 1937
- Purpose: Investigation of the causes of the 1936 Arab revolt in Palestine

The Peel Commission, formally known as the Palestine Royal Commission, was a British Royal Commission of Inquiry, headed by Lord Peel, appointed in 1936 to investigate the causes of conflict in Mandatory Palestine, which was administered by the United Kingdom, following a six-month-long Arab general strike.

On 7 July 1937, the commission published a report that, for the first time, stated that the League of Nations Mandate had become unworkable and recommended partition. The British cabinet endorsed the Partition plan in principle but requested more information. Following the publication, in 1938 the Woodhead Commission was appointed to examine it in detail and recommend an actual partition plan.

The Arab leadership opposed the partition plan. The Arab Higher Committee opposed the idea of a Jewish state and called for an independent state of Palestine, "with protection of all legitimate Jewish and other minority rights and safeguarding of reasonable British interests". They also demanded cessation of all Jewish immigration and land purchase. They argued that the creation of a Jewish state and lack of independent Palestine was a betrayal of the word given by Britain.

The Zionist leadership was bitterly divided over the plan. In a resolution adopted at the 1937 Zionist Congress, the delegates rejected the specific partition plan. Yet the principle of partition is generally thought to have been "accepted" or "not rejected outright" by any major faction: the delegates empowered the leadership to pursue future negotiations. The Jewish Agency Council later attached a request that a conference be convened to explore a peaceful settlement in terms of an undivided Palestine. According to Benny Morris, Ben-Gurion and Weizmann saw it "as a stepping stone to some further expansion and the eventual takeover of the whole of Palestine".

== History ==
Palestine Royal Commission Cmd 5479

With the collapse of the Ottoman Empire at the end of World War I, The United Kingdom was given a mandate by the League of Nations to administer the region known as Palestine. The mandate continued in force until the United Kingdom withdrew from it in 1948. The solution led to other problems, however, as the British sought to honor the Balfour Declaration while protecting the rights of the prior inhabitants of the territory. The British government investigated numerous possibilities for the region, including partition.

The commission was established at a time of increased violence; serious clashes between Arabs and Jews broke out in 1936 and were to last three years. On 11 November 1936, the commission arrived in Palestine to investigate the reasons behind the uprising. The commission was charged with determining the cause of the riots, and judging the grievances of both sides. Chaim Weizmann made a speech on behalf of the Jews. On 25 November 1936, testifying before the Peel Commission, Weizmann said that there are in Europe 6,000,000 Jews ... "for whom the world is divided into places where they cannot live and places where they cannot enter."

The Mufti of Jerusalem, Hajj Amin al-Husseini, testified in front of the commission, opposing any partition of Arab lands with the Jews. He demanded full cessation of Jewish immigration. Although the Arabs continued to boycott the Commission officially, there was a sense of urgency to respond to Weizmann's appeal to restore calm. The former Mayor of Jerusalem Ragheb Bey al-Nashashibi—who was the Mufti's rival in the internal Palestinian arena, was thus sent to explain the Arab perspective through unofficial channels.

In 1981 it was disclosed that the Jewish Agency Executive Political Department had installed microphones in the room in which the commission was meeting and Ben Gurion was able to read transcripts of evidence held in camera.

== Membership ==
The Chairman of the Commission was William Peel, 1st Earl Peel and the Vice-Chairman was Sir Horace Rumbold, 9th Baronet. The other members were Sir Laurie Hammond, Sir Morris Carter, Sir Harold Morris, and Reginald Coupland.

== Conclusions ==
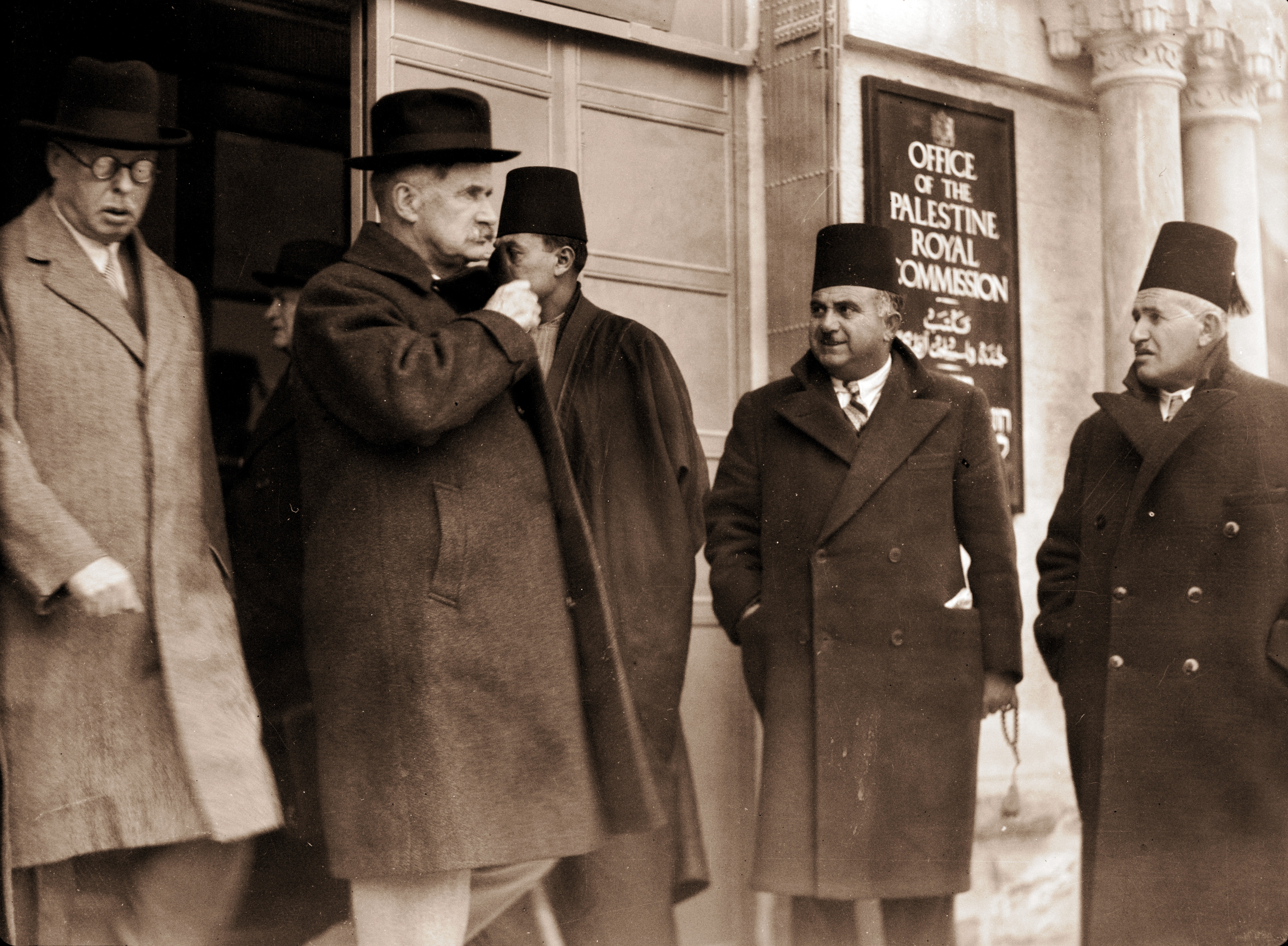
Lord Peel, 1936

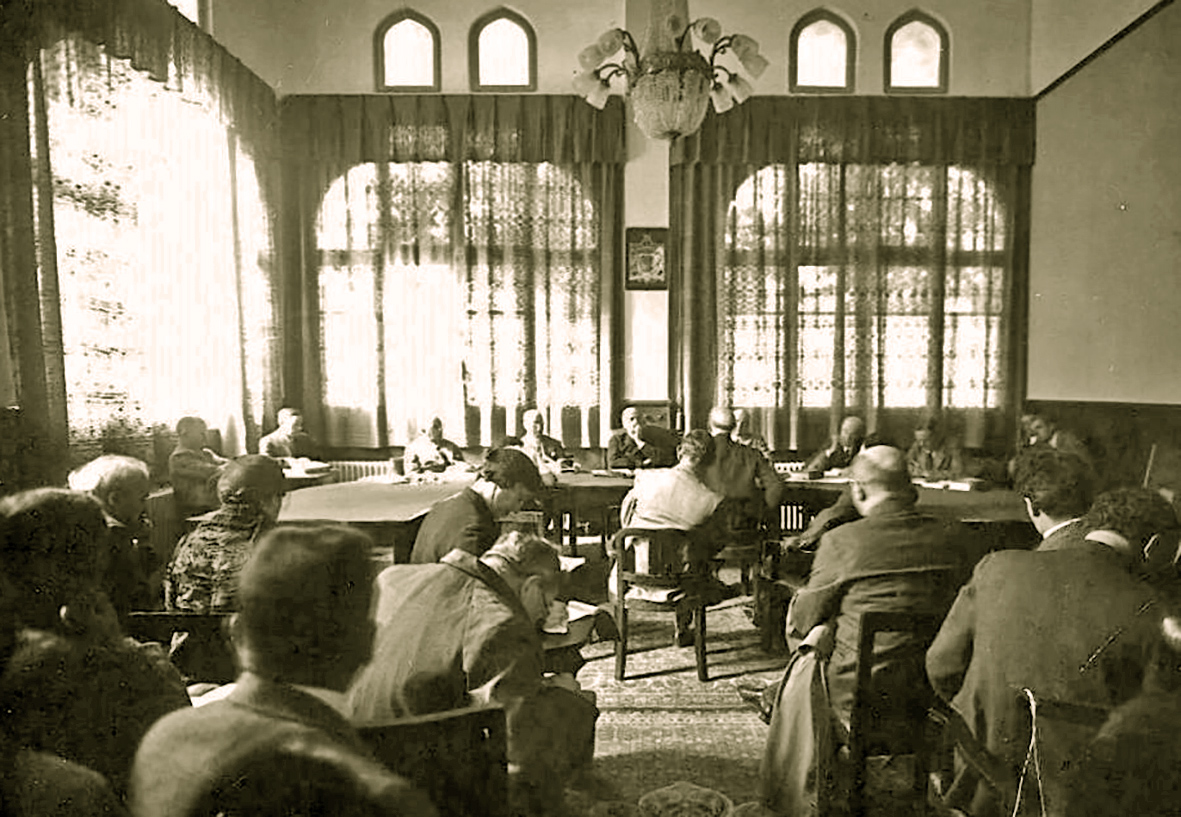
Chaim Weizmann giving evidence

The causes of the Arab rebellion that broke out in the previous year were judged to be as follows:

First, the desire of the Arabs for national independence; secondly, their antagonism to the establishment of the Jewish National Home in Palestine, quickened by their fear of Jewish domination. Among contributory causes were the effect on Arab opinion of the attainment of national independence by ‘Iraq, Trans-Jordan, Egypt, Syria and the Lebanon; the rush of Jewish immigrants escaping from Central and Eastern Europe; the inequality of opportunity enjoyed by Arabs and Jews respectively in placing their case before Your Majesty’s Government and the public; the growth of Arab mistrust; Arab alarm at the continued purchase of Arab land by the intensive character and the "modernism" of Jewish nationalism; and lastly the general uncertainty, accentuated by the ambiguity of certain phrases in the Mandate, as to the ultimate intentions of the Mandatory Power.

The Commission found that the drafters of the Mandate could not have foreseen the advent of massive Jewish immigration, that they considered due to "drastic restriction of immigration into the United States, the advent of the National Socialist Government in Germany in 1933 and the increasing economic pressure on the Jews in Poland." They wrote that "The continued impact of a highly intelligent and enterprising race, backed by large financial resources, on a comparatively poor indigenous community, on a different cultural level, may produce in time serious reactions."

The Commission found that "though the Arabs have benefited by the development of the country owing to Jewish immigration, this has had no conciliatory effect. On the contrary, improvement in the economic situation in Palestine has meant the deterioration of the political situation". Addressing the "Arab charge that the Jews have obtained too large a proportion of good land cannot be maintained", the Commission noted that "Much of the land now carrying orange groves was sand dunes or swamp and uncultivated when it was purchased." They write that "The shortage of land is, we consider, due less to the amount of land acquired by Jews than to the increase in the Arab population". "Endeavours to control the alienation of land by Arabs to Jews have not been successful. In the hills there is no more room for further close settlement by Jews; in the plains it should only be allowed under certain restrictions."

The Commission stated that Government have attempted to discharge the contradictory obligations of the Mandatory under conditions of great difficulty by "holding the balance" between Jews and Arabs. Repeated attempts to conciliate either race have only increased the trouble. The situation in Palestine has reached a deadlock. Development of local autonomy and self-governing institutions, this also has been hampered.

The Commission concluded that the prospect of a unified Palestine with Jews and Arabs as fellow citizens in a common state was remote due to the highly nationalistic natures of the two communities. On the nature of the Yishuv, it wrote that:

The Jewish National Home is no longer an experiment. The growth of its population has been accompanied by political, social and economic developments along the lines laid down at the outset. The chief novelty is the urban and industrial development. The contrast between the modern democratic and primarily European character of the National Home and that of the Arab world around it is striking. The temper of the Home is strongly nationalist. There can be no question of fusion or assimilation between Jewish and Arab cultures. The National Home cannot be half-national.

It also concluded that such a prospect was growing less realistic with time due to the nature of the Jewish education system, which was causing a rise in Jewish nationalism, writing that "from the ages of three or four years, when children enter the kindergarten to be taught Hebrew if they do not know it already, pride in the past of Jewry and in the National Home as an exclusively and intensely Jewish achievement is the dynamic centre-point of their whole intellectual development. The idea that they are to share their life in any way with the Arabs, that they are growing up to be fellow-citizens with Arabs in a common Palestinian state, is only recognised in the teaching of a little Arabic in the secondary schools... So far, in fact, from facilitating a better understanding between the races, the Jewish educational system is making it more and more difficult as, year by year, its production of eager Jewish nationalists mounts up."

The committee concluded that Arab nationalism was also a potent force and that the two communities were more loyal to their own national leaderships than the Palestine administration:

Arab nationalism is as intense a force as Jewish. The Arab leaders' demand for national self-government and the shutting down of the Jewish National Home has remained unchanged since 1929. Like Jewish nationalism, Arab nationalism is stimulated by the educational system and by the growth of the Youth Movement. It has also been greatly encouraged by the recent Anglo-Egyptian and Franco-Syrian Treaties. The gulf between the races is thus already wide and will continue to widen if the present Mandate is maintained. The position of the Palestine Government between the two antagonistic communities is unenviable. There are two rival bodies – the Arab Higher Committee allied with the Supreme Moslem Council on the one hand, and the Jewish Agency allied with the Va'ad Leumi on the other – who make a stronger appeal to the natural loyalty of the Arab and the Jews than does the Government of Palestine. The sincere attempts of the Government to treat the two races impartially have not improved the relations between them. Nor has the policy of conciliating Arab opposition been successful. The events of last year proved that conciliation is useless.

The summary report statement concerning the possibility of lasting settlement states: "An irrepressible conflict has arisen between two national communities within the narrow bounds of one small country. There is no common ground between them. Their national aspirations are incompatible. The Arabs desire to revive the traditions of the Arab golden age. The Jews desire to show what they can achieve when restored to the land in which the Jewish nation was born. Neither of the two national ideals permits of combination in the service of a single State.

== Recommendations ==
The Commission reached the conclusion that the Mandate had become unworkable and must be abolished in favour of partition, as the only solution to the Arab–Jewish "deadlock". It outlined ten points on: a Treaty system between the Arab and Jewish States and the new Mandatory Government; a Mandate for the Holy places; the frontiers; the need for Inter-State Subvention; the need for British Subvention; tariffs and ports; nationality; civil service; Industrial concessions; and the exchange of land and populations.

A Treaty system based on the Iraqi-Syrian precedent, proposed: Permanent mandates for the Jerusalem area and "corridor" stretching to the Mediterranean coast at Jaffa—and the land under its authority (and accordingly, the transfer of both Arab and Jewish populations) be apportioned between an Arab and Jewish state. The Jewish side was to receive a territorially smaller portion in the mid-west and north, from Mount Carmel to south of Be'er Tuvia, as well as the Jezreel Valley and the Galilee, while territory in the south and mid-east which included Judea, Samaria, and the sizable Negev desert would be combined with Trans-Jordan to form an Arab state.

The report stated that Jews contribute more per capita to the revenues of Palestine than the Arabs, and the Government has thereby been enabled to maintain public services for the Arabs at a higher level than would otherwise have been possible. Partition would mean, on the one hand, that the Arab Area would no longer profit from the taxable capacity of the Jewish Area. On the other hand, (1) the Jews would acquire a new right of sovereignty in the Jewish Area; (2) that Area, as we have defined it, would be larger than the existing area of Jewish land and settlement; (3) the Jews would be freed from their present liability for helping to promote the welfare of Arabs outside that Area. It is suggested, therefore, that the Jewish State should provide a subsidy to the Arab State when Partition comes into effect. Citing the separation of Sind from Bombay and of Burma from the Indian Empire, as precedents for such financial arrangement.

The report stated that if Partition is to be effective in promoting a final settlement it must mean more than drawing a frontier and establishing two States. Sooner or later there should be a transfer of land and, as far as possible, an exchange of population. Citing as precedent the 1923 population exchange between Greece and Turkey, which addressed the constant friction between their minorities. While noting the absence of cultivable land to resettle the Arabs, which would necessitate the execution of large-scale plans for irrigation, water-storage, and development in Trans-Jordan, Beersheba and the Jordan Valley. The population exchange, if carried out, would have involved the transfer of up to 225,000 Arabs and 1,250 Jews.

== Reactions ==
=== Arab ===
Although some factions of the Palestinian Arab leadership initially supported partition, a wide spectrum of Palestinian Arab society rejected the plan. There was widespread public opposition including in the media and by religious figures. According to Henry Laurens, the Arabs saw the publication of the plan as a ringing disavowal of every key undertaking the Mandatory authorities had made since its inception, that there would be no separate Jewish state, no land expropriations and no expulsions of people. The proposed land swaps and population transfers were seen as annulling and inverting a century of economic development of the littoral region, with, apart from Jaffa and Gaza, Palestinians dispossessed of the essential rural and urban heritage that had evolved over the preceding century of coastal development. Jerusalem was placed outside the future Palestinian state. Palestinians were shocked both by the declaration their land would be divided, and that they themselves would be denied statehood (but only a union with Transjordan), while the Jewish state, extending over a third of the country, would absorb the whole of the Galilee, where an overwhelming percentage of the land was owned by Arabs and Jews had only a slender presence. In compensation, the Arabs were offered valuable areas to the east of Jordan and the southern portion of the Beisan sub-district where irrigation would have been possible. Indignation was widespread with Arabs complaining that the Plan had allotted to them "the barren mountains", while the Jews would receive most of the five cultivable plains, the maritime Plain, the Acre Plain, the Marj Ibn 'Amir, Al Huleh and the Jordan Valley For the Arabs, the plan envisaged giving Zionists the best land, with 82% of Palestine's principal export, citrus fruit, consigned to Jewish control.

The idea of transfer of population met strong opposition. Under the Peel proposal, before transfer, there would be 1,250 Jews in the proposed Arab state, while there would be 225,000 Arabs in the Jewish state. The Peel proposal suggested a population transfer based on the model of Greece and Turkey in 1923, which would have been "in the last resort ... compulsory". It was understood on all sides that there was no way of dividing the land which would not have meant a large number of Arabs (a large minority or even a majority) in the land designated for a Jewish state.

At the leadership level, there were tensions between the factions. Amin al-Husseini, who according to his biographer was an "authoritarian who could not tolerate opposition", feared the recommended merger with Transjordan under the rule of King Abdullah. The latter stood to gain much from partition; reaching an accord with the notables of the Nashashibi family could have consolidated his rule and left Husseini powerless. The Palestinians also opposed being consigned to the far more economically feeble society of the Transjordan. The al-Husayni family therefore initially unilaterally boycotted the Peel Commission, which the Nashashibis (who had strong roots in both the littoral region and Jerusalem) and other Arab leaders considered a foolhardy strategy, while the Nashashibis and Jordan's King Abdullah initially supported partition, a rift which led the Nashashibis to leave the Arab Higher Committee (AHC). In 1937, the US Consul General at Jerusalem reported to the State Department that Husseini, the Grand Mufti of Jerusalem, refused the principle of partition and declined to consider it. The Consul said the emir Abdullah urged acceptance on the ground that realities must be faced, but wanted modification of the proposed boundaries and Arab administrations in the neutral enclave. The Consul also noted that Nashashibi sidestepped the principle, but was willing to negotiate for favorable modifications. Amin al-Husseini was persuaded by the other Arab leaders to testify to the Commission.

However, the wide opposition to the plan in the Arab community led to the Nashashibis making a U-turn, publishing their rejection of the plan two days before the AHC. They argued that the creation of a Jewish state and lack of independent Palestine was a betrayal of the word given by Britain, and emphatically rejected the idea of giving land to the Jews. This objection was accompanied by a proposal that Britain adhere to its promise of a sovereign democratic state with constitutional guarantees for the rights of the Jewish minority. The Plan was also repudiated at the Bloudan Conference convened in Syria on 8 September, where parties from all over the Arab world rejected both the partition and establishment of a Jewish state in the Palestine Mandate.

=== Jewish ===
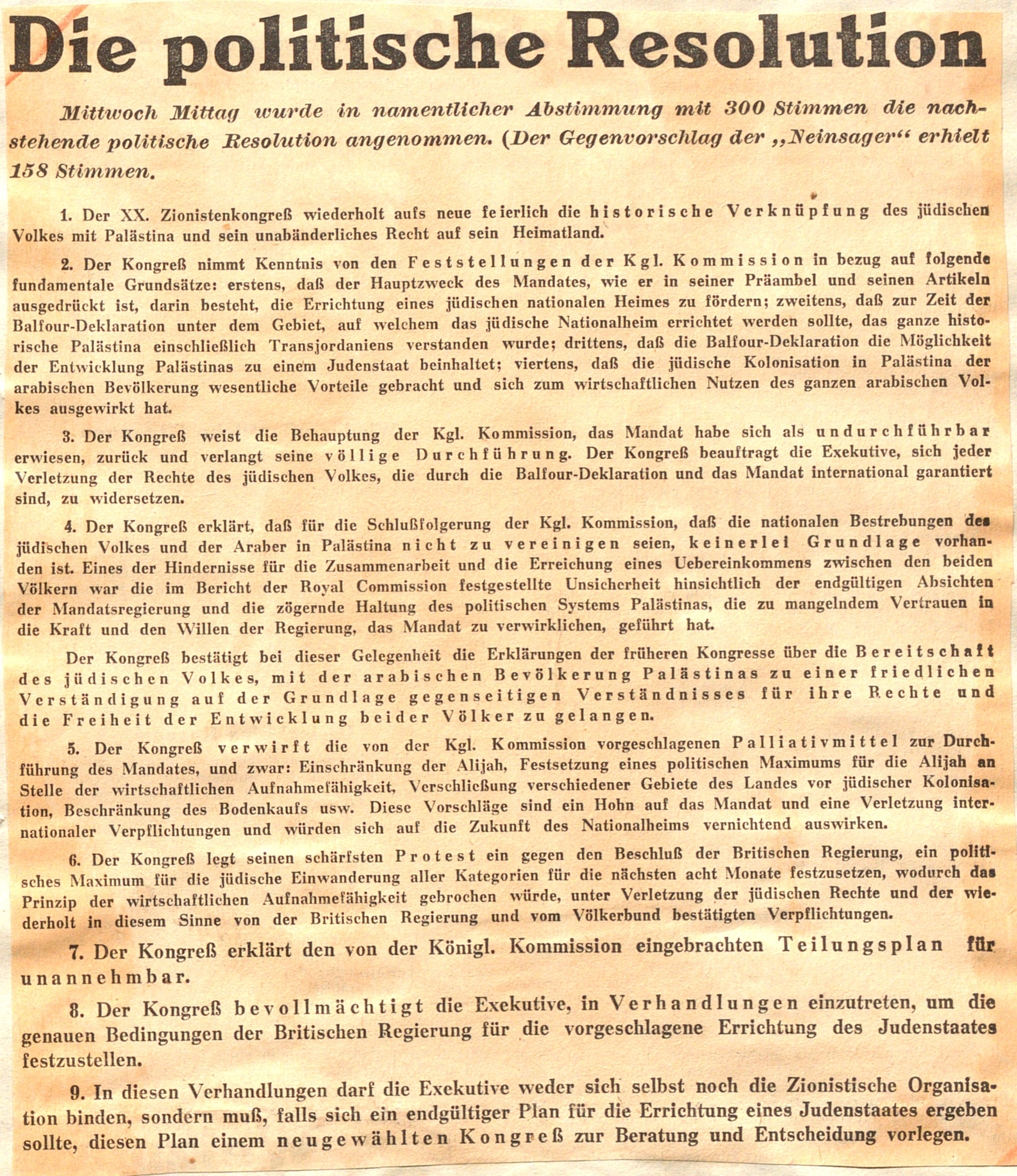
Zionist Congress resolution on the Peel Commission partition plan

On 20 August 1937, the Twentieth Zionist Congress asserted that, at the time of the Balfour Declaration, it was understood that the Jewish National Home was to be established in the whole of historic Palestine, including Trans-Jordan, and that inherent in the Declaration was the possibility of the evolution of Palestine into a Jewish State.

While some factions at the Congress supported the Peel Report, arguing that later the borders could be adjusted, others opposed the proposal because the Jewish State would be too small. The Congress decided to reject the specific borders recommended by the Peel Commission, but empowered its executive to negotiate a more favorable plan for a Jewish State in Palestine. In the wake of the Peel Commission, the Jewish Agency set up committees to begin planning for the state. At the time, it had already created a complete administrative apparatus amounting to "a Government existing side by side with the Mandatory Government."

At the same Zionist Congress, David Ben-Gurion, then chairman of the executive committee of the Jewish Agency for Palestine, told those in attendance that, though "there could be no question...of giving up any part of the Land of Israel,... it was arguable that the ultimate goal would be achieved most quickly by accepting the Peel proposals." University of Arizona professor Charles D. Smith suggests that, "Weizmann and Ben-Gurion did not feel they had to be bound by the borders proposed [by the Peel Commission]. These could be considered temporary boundaries to be expanded in the future." Ben-Gurion saw the plan as only a stage in the realisation of a larger Jewish state.

The two main Jewish leaders, Chaim Weizmann and Ben-Gurion, had convinced the Zionist Congress to approve equivocally the Peel recommendations as a basis for more negotiation.

== Aftermath ==
The Peel Plan proved to be the master partition plan, on which all those that followed were either based, or to which they were compared, ushering in a fundamental change in the British outlook on Palestine's future.

Following the report's publication the British Government released a statement of policy, agreeing with its conclusions and proposing to seek from the League of Nations authority to proceed with a plan of partition. In March 1938, the British appointed the Woodhead Commission to "examine the Peel Commission plan in detail and to recommend an actual partition plan". The Woodhead Commission considered three different plans, one of which was based on the Peel plan. Reporting in 1938, the Commission rejected the Peel plan primarily on the grounds that it could not be implemented without a massive forced transfer of Arabs (an option that the British government had already ruled out). With dissent from some of its members, the Commission instead recommended a plan that would leave the Galilee under British mandate, but emphasized serious problems with it that included a lack of financial self-sufficiency of the proposed Arab State. The British Government accompanied the publication of the Woodhead Report by a statement of policy rejecting partition as impracticable due to "political, administrative and financial difficulties".

At the Bloudan Conference of 1937, parties from all over the Arab world rejected both the partition and establishment of a Jewish state in Palestine, thus claiming all of Palestine.

== See also ==
- Arab–Israeli conflict
- White Paper of 1939
- Shaw Report
