= Kahlouniyeh =

Kahlouniyeh الكحلونية Al-Kahluniyah
- Location in Lebanon
- Coordinates: 33°39′21″N 35°35′25″E
- Country: Lebanon
- Governorate: Mount Lebanon
- District: Chouf

Area
  - Total: 375 ha (930 acres)
- Elevation: 850 m (2,790 ft)

Kahlouniyeh, (Levantine Arabic: الكحلونية, romanized: al-Kaḥlūniyeh) also written El Kahloûnîyé, is a municipality in the Chouf District of Mount Lebanon Governorate, Lebanon. It has an average elevation of 850 meters above sea level and its total land area is 375 hectares. Its inhabitants are predominantly Druze. Kahlouniyeh was named for the Arabic word "khôl", an eye makeup, and the area was involved in the trade and production of it. The Souayjani castle ruins are in the area. The location of Kahlouniyeh is 850 meters above sea level. Kahlouniyeh was the birthplace of the Arab nationalist rebel commander, Hamad Sa'b.
