= Binod Mitter =

Sir Binod Chandra Mitter, PC (2 February 1872 – 20 July 1930) was an Indian jurist.

== Biography ==
The son of the judge Sir Romesh Chunder Mitter (or Mitra), Binod Mitter was a Member of the Council of the Governor of Bengal from 1910 to 1917, Standing Counsel to the Government of India from 1910 to 1916, and Advocate-General to the Government of Bengal in 1917. He was knighted in 1918.

In 1929, Mitter was appointed as one of the salaried members of the Judicial Committee of the Privy Council and was sworn in as a member of the Privy Council; he was the second Hindu to be appointed to the Privy Council, after Lord Sinha. He died in London the following year, leaving five sons and five daughters, having been unwell since his wife's death in May 1930.
