= Romesh Chandra Mitra =

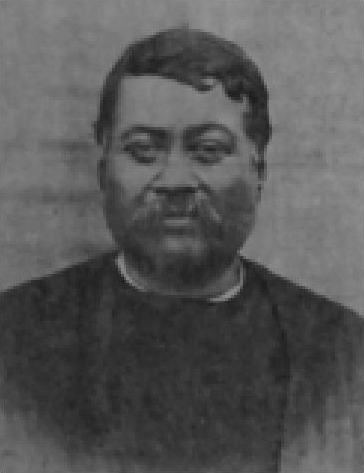
Portrait of Romesh Chandra

Sir Romesh Chandra Mitra or Romesh Chunder Mitter (1840–13 July 1899) was an Indian judge and the first Indian officiating Acting Chief Justice of the Calcutta High Court in 1886. Sir Romesh Mitra Girls School was founded in his honour in 1897. The school located in Bhowanipore is affiliated to the Central Board of Secondary Education.

== Early life ==
Romesh Chandra Mitter was born in British India in 1840 at Rajarhat, Bishnupur, in the then undivided 24 Parganas. His father was Ramchandra Mitter. Ramesh Chandra entered in Hare School and Presidency College Calcutta. After completion of B.A and B.L., he practised in City Civil Court in Calcutta.

== Works ==
He was appointed a judge of the Calcutta High Court in 1874, aged 34, and held office until 1890. In 1886, he became the first Indian to hold the office of Chief Justice in the court, albeit on a temporary basis. He also served on the Viceroy's Legislative Council. When the majority of the Bench determined that Surendranath Banerjee was guilty of contempt of court, Mitter differed with other British judges on the question of punishment. During his term as Viceroy, Lord Dufferin appointed Mitter as a member of the Public Service Commission. He was also involved with the Indian National Congress, and with social and judicial reforms in British India. Mitter was a member of the working committee of the University of Calcutta and Ripon College. He established a Sanskrit Chatuspathi in Bhawanipur. He established a Bengali-medium school named 'Bishnupur Uchho-Engraji Bidyalay', at his native place in 1880. The school was renamed as Bishnupur Sir Romesh Institution or BSRI in 1919.

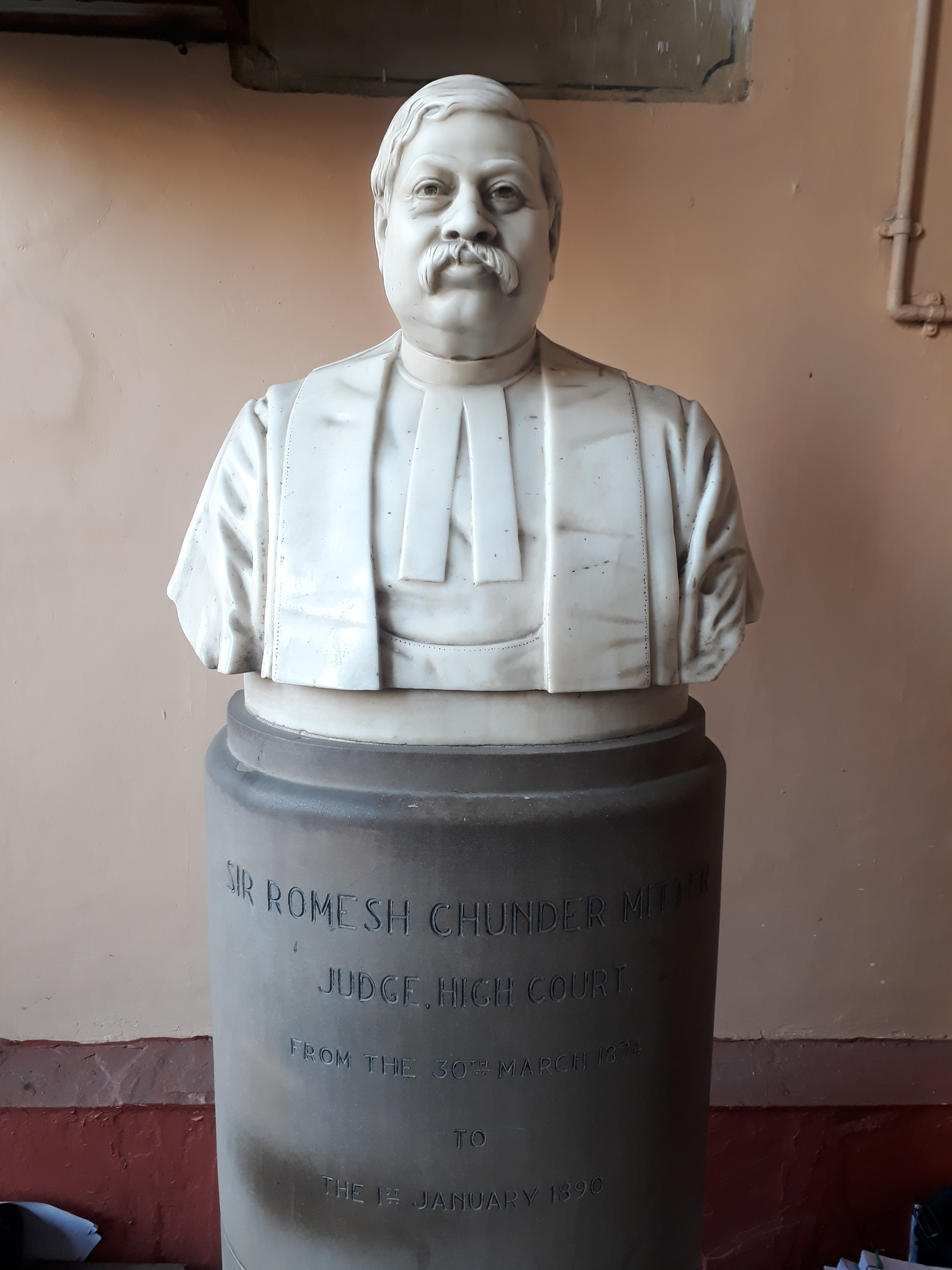
Statue of Romesh Chandra in Calcutta High Court.

== Death ==
Mitter offered his resignation in 1889 and formally retired from the court on 1 January 1890. He had been late to an appointment at court, having forgotten about it, and believed that his mistake was unfitting for his position. He was knighted in June 1890 and died on 13 July 1899.

== Family ==
A son, Sir Binod Chandra Mitter, was a salaried member of the Judicial Committee of the Privy Council. His another son, Provash Chandra Mitter, was a member of the Bengali Legislative Assembly.
