= Daniel Ocone =

American mathematician

Daniel Leonard Ocone (born 1953) is a Professor in the Mathematics Department at Rutgers University, where he specializes in probability theory and stochastic processes. He obtained his Ph.D. at MIT in 1980 under the supervision of Sanjoy K. Mitter. He is known for the Clark–Ocone theorem in stochastic analysis. The continuous Ocone martingale is also named after him; it is a continuous martingale that is conditionally Gaussian, given its quadratic variation process.
