= Laurie Hammond =

British colonial administrator

Sir Egbert Laurie Lucas Hammond, KCSI, CBE (12 January 1873 – 28 January 1939) was a British colonial administrator in India. A leading expert in Indian electoral reform, he was Governor of Assam from 1927 to 1932.

The son of the Rev. Joseph Hammond, Canon of Truro Cathedral, Laurie Hammond was educated at Newton Abbot College, South Devon and Keble College, Oxford. He passed into the Indian Civil Service by examination in 1895 and went out to Bengal the following year.

He was a member of the Peel Commission.
