= History of the Arabs (disambiguation) =

History of the Arabs may refer to:

- History of the Arabs, with regard to the Arab people across West Asia and North Africa
- History of the Arabs (book), a 1937 book by Lebanese-American professor Philip Khuri Hitti
- A History of the Arab Peoples, a 1991 book by Lebanese-British historian Albert Habib Hourani
- Arabs: A 3,000-Year History of Peoples, Tribes and Empires, a 2019 book by British author Tim Mackintosh-Smith
- History of the Palestinians, who are an Arab people
