= Arabs: A 3,000-Year History of Peoples, Tribes and Empires =

2019 non-fiction book by Tim Mackintosh Smith

- Cover of the hardback edition
- Author: Tim Mackintosh-Smith
- Cover artist: Alex Kirby
- Language: English
- Genre: History
- Published: April 2019 (Yale University Press)
- Media type: Hardback; paperback; audiobook; e-book
- Pages: 630/656
- ISBN: 978-0-300-18028-2
- OCLC: 1089126294
- LC Class: 2018968579

Arabs: A 3,000-Year History of Peoples, Tribes and Empires is a 2019 non-fiction book by British author and Arabist Tim Mackintosh-Smith. The book was written over nine years in Sanaa, Yemen, and during the last four years, the author was confined in his neighbourhood due to the eruption of the Yemeni Civil War. Covering the history of Arabs from their first known mention in 853 BCE up to the present, the book uses Arabic language as a unifying factor to tell the story. Arabs was met with dozens of reviews and mentions, the vast majority of them favorable.

== Background ==
Mackintosh-Smith is an Arabist, travel writer and Arabic translator. He is a fellow of the Royal Asiatic Society of Great Britain and Ireland and an emeritus Senior Fellow of the New York University Library of Arabic Literature. He views himself as a post-Orientalist, a term referring to Palestinian scholar Edward Said's book Orientalism. In his early twenties, he received a degree in Arabic studies from the University of Oxford and later moved to Yemen. He considers Yemen his adoptive country and has lived there for over 35 years. He reads and speaks Arabic fluently, with a Yemeni accent. His house in the capital Sanaa is a "medieval tower".

Mackintosh-Smith wrote several travel books including two about Yemen and a trilogy associated with Moroccan medieval explorer Ibn Battuta, which earned him the 1998 Thomas Cook Travel Book Award, the 2010 Oldie Best Travel Award and the 2010 Ibn Battuta Prize of Honour. The BBC produced a television series about his journey following the footsteps of Ibn Battuta.

In 2009 Mackintosh-Smith was commissioned by Yale University Press to write a book about Arab history, although he initially declined the task, because it was "too much work". He estimated it would take him 5 years, but eventually he needed about 9 years. The Yemeni Civil War (2015–present) confined him in his neighbourhood for more than 4 years. It was during this time of "neighbourhood arrest", with mortar shells and missiles falling around, and daily reverberating chants of "Death to America" that he wrote his Arabs. Due to total power cuts in Yemen during the war, the author used a solar panel powered laptop to write the book. Fleeing the war temporarily, Mackintosh-Smith has been staying in Kuala Lumpur since late 2019.

The book cover was designed by Alex Kirby. The choice to use gold foil patterns was meant to give it the look of "the definitive volume on the subject". Kirby said the inspiration for the cover came after he had gone through "dozens of books and sites featuring Islamic calligraphy, patterns and motifs". The cover design was chosen for the Association of American University Presses 2020 Book, Jacket, and Journal Show.

The audiobook was read by Ralph Lister, and is 25 hours 34 minutes long.

== Content ==
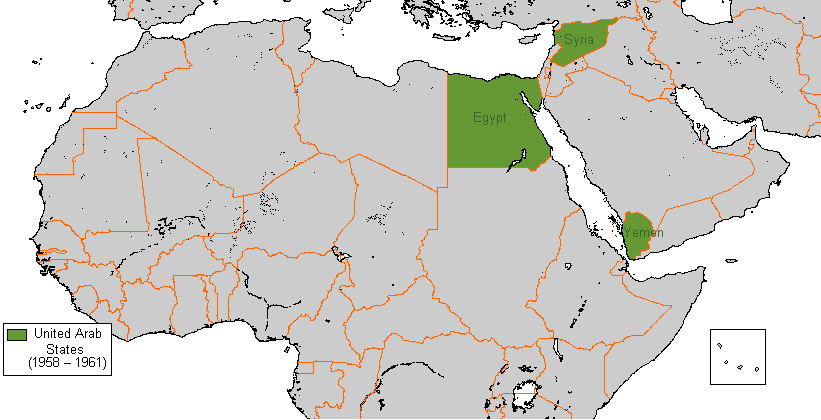
The United Arab States was a short-lived confederation of the United Arab Republic (Egypt and Syria) and North Yemen from 1958 to 1961.

The title of the book refers to Arabs without using the definite article "the" (Arabs instead of the Arabs) because, according to the author, the meaning of the word has repeatedly changed over time, making it "misleading" to use. The subtitle is partly inspired by Quranic verse 49:13: "O mankind, We have created you from male and female, and made you into peoples and tribes, that you may know one another. [emphasis added]".

In addition to the foreword, introduction and afterword, the book is divided into six main parts that cover the three main "waves of unity" of recorded Arab history with each taking about the same number of pages. The first wave (900 BC to AD 630) contains parts on "Emergence" and "Revolution", the second (630 to 1350) contains "Dominance" and "Decline", and the third (1350 to now) covers "Eclipse" and "Re-emergence".

The books opens in the foreword by asking a central question that would form the main theme of its thesis, namely about the causes of Arab unity and disunity. The author highlights the ambiguity associated with defining the meaning of the term "Arab" and notes the importance of Classical Arabic language in uniting this ethnic group, and thus the need to study its history. He considers language to be the "defining feature" of Arabs, calling them "arabophones" and referring to the Arab world as the "Arabic world". He emphasizes the importance of studying Arab history from the beginning, with the first mention of them in 853 BC, rather than from the rise of Islam as Albert Hourani did. At the time of writing this section in 2017, the time between then and the year 582 when, according to Islamic tradition, Muhammad, still a boy, was first recognized as prophet is exactly the same as between that and 853 BC (1435 years), meaning the rise of Islam lies in the middle rather than beginning of Arab history. Starting from the beginning is necessary in order to "de-islamize" and "re-arabize" the history of Arabs.

=== Emergence 900 BC – 600 AD ===
The first definitely known mention of Arabs in history dates to 853 BC in an Assyrian text which mentions a man named Gindibu, an Arab chieftain who owned 1,000 camels and helped King Shalmaneser III defeat his enemies. Arabs were marginal compared to Babylonians, Assyrians, Persians and Romans in the north and Sabaeans in the south. The Sabaeans and other South Arabian people did not speak Arabic; rather, their language group is Old South Arabian, which is as different from Arabic as German is from Italian. The abundance of Arabic dialects suggests the language was not unified at the time, and that Arabs were a mixed group genetically and linguistically, which is one possible etymology for the word "Arab".

== Reviews ==
Arabs received dozens of reviews and mentions, the vast majority of them favorable.

=== Favorable ===
In a review published in The Guardian, Ian Black spoke favorably of the book, citing different passages that span the centuries of Arab history. He was particularly fascinated by the author's ability to combine "deep learning with penetrating insights delivered with dazzling turns of phrase and illuminating comparisons". He praised Mackintosh-Smith's use of analogies between past and present, which in addition to the attention paid to details helped to forge a "richly detailed chronicle of Arab language and culture". Steve Donoghue of The National reviewed it favorably, describing it as "a thoroughly remarkable achievement". While he found the first part of the book "haphazard" due to the gaps in documentation of early Arab history, the subsequent parts starting from the rise of Islam were "more readable". "[T]he bulk of this astounding book portrays grand personalities, national journeys and thrilling adventures, all seen through the prism of Arabic language," he added. Donoghue also wrote for Open Letters Review where he listed Arabs as one of the best 2019 history books and described it as "immersive".

In the New Statesman, Shiraz Maher called the book "extraordinary", noting its "original and interesting" use of the Arabic Language to chronicle the history of Arabs. He also praised it for avoiding Islamo-centrism in that it gave equal coverage to Arab history before, during and after the advent of Islam. Of particular interest to Maher was the author's direct addressing of modern controversial topics. The book was hailed as an excellent source for experts and non-experts alike. In The Spectator, Anthony Sattin referred to the book as "magisterial", "brilliant" and "important", emphasizing many of the same highlights as Maher. He added that Mackintosh-Smith is a "worthy successor" to historians Philip Hitti, Albert Hourani and Eugene Rogan who wrote influential works about Arab history. Sattin added:

[Arabs] is a book of vast scope and stunning insight, which manages to discuss even the seemingly intractable issues between Sunnis and Shi’ah and the intricacies of Arabic with a light touch, an easy style and a telling detail. Language emerges as the key to Arab identity, so it is not by chance that there are more entries for Arabic in the index than for anything else.

Another reviewer who compared Mackintosh-Smith to Albert Hourani was Robert Irwin. Writing for Literary Review, he said that Arabs was even more remarkable than Hourani's "great study" A History of the Arab Peoples. Irwin found the author's coverage of the Pre-Islamic era unusual, and his focus on the influence of ancient Arab Kingdoms over Islam as "careful and original". He added:

[Arabs] is a passionate and highly original meditation on Arab history in which etymological insights, snippets of poetry and historical anecdotes (a large number of which are apocryphal) are used to shed light on the Arabs’ past and their uncertain future [...] Although Mackintosh-Smith's book is perfectly scholarly, it is not a dutiful plod through a succession of slaughtered sultans and viziers or a tallying of gains and losses in forgotten battles in unpronounceable places. On the contrary, Arabs keeps throwing out brilliant insights, like sparks from a Catherine wheel.

Robert Irwin, for The Times Literary Supplement, named the book as his favorite of 2019, and described it as "exhilarating" despite its melancholic conclusions. The Penang Institute, which hosted an event for the author, said the book was "widely acknowledged to be the best single-volume history of the Arabs in the English language". During the event, Gareth Richards described the book as a "really superlative book". "It's really a book that betrays tremendous knowledge, mastering a huge range of sources. It's written very compellingly, beautifully erudite, and [...] it's also very very witty [...] it's really history at its best," he added. Noting that it took the author 9 years to write, he called it his magnum opus. In a brief review, Kirkus Reviews described the book as "[a] marvelous journey brimming with adventure and poetry and narrated by a keen, compassionate observer". Another short review was written by Jon Grand for The Book Stall Newsletter where he described the book as essential for understanding Arabs.

Listed in The Evening Standard's best summer holiday reads for 2019, Arabs was described as an "erudite study" that "was worth the wait". It was also listed by The Bookseller as Editor's Choice for history, where it was described as an "extraordinarily comprehensive history of the Arabs and their culture". In Open, Keerthik Sasidharan listed Arabs as one of the 4 best books he read in 2019. He described it as a "marvel of lucidity" and "a lesson in how to be scholarly without being pedantic, on how to think about history". To him, Mackintosh-Smith is a "patient lover" who explores obscure parts of the vast Arab world and history. Tufts University listed the book in their 2020 Summer Books Recommendations, with Taylor McNeil describing it as a "magisterial book" that is "always clever, witty, and erudite". He expressed his sadness for finishing the book, and vowed to reread it. "[T]his is no rote recounting of history, but a deep and compelling take on who the Arabs are—and are not—and on the constant tension between unification of the Arabs as a people and their inevitable conflict and dissolution," he added.

In The Irish Times, Darragh Geraghty named the audiobook version of Arabs as one of 35 best listens during the COVID-19 lockdowns. He described it as surprisingly engaging, and praised its focus on Arabic culture and language rather than Islam. The Boston Athenæum also recommended reading the book. Jamil Sherif of Salaam hailed the book as a "masterpiece of historical explanation" and "monumental work of scholarship and erudition", emphasizing the author's sense of humour and ability to link past and present. In The British-Yemeni Society Journal, Noel Brehony reviewed the book favorably. He mentioned that Arabs "has been widely praised" and cited a passage from Ian Black's review in The Guardian. Viewing it as the successor to Hourani's book on the same topic, he praised the book's use of words to "enlighten, entertain and inspire". He added:

[Arabs] is a formidable piece of scholarship but told using anecdote, quotation, striking and original analogy and parallels between the past and the present to make it a joy to read. This reviewer, though at first daunted by its length, found himself drawn in and eager to spend an hour daily enjoying the author's erudition, command of the sources – historical as well as literary, prose as well as poetry – and brilliant turn of phrase. It is comprehensive and the subject matter complex, but he makes it utterly comprehensible.

Justin Marozzi reviewed the book favorably in The Sunday Times. He said Arabs was a rare "combination of commanding erudition and swashbuckling prose". "[Mackintosh-Smith] writes with wonderful verve. Idioms and irreverence abound," he added. Marozzi nevertheless was mildy critical of the editing, "[u]ndoubtedly brilliant, his book might have benefited from a sharper editorial knife," he explained. He encouraged readers to buy the book to support the author as he, according to his website, was "impecunious". Arabs was listed in The Sunday Times best history books for 2019 where it was described as "sumptuous" and written with "infectious enthusiasm". Writing for The Times (sister paper of The Sunday Times), Richard Spencer made a similar note to Marozzi regarding the book's need for more editing. Nevertheless, his review was also favorable, describing Arabs as a "sweeping book" that employs "meticulous scholarship" and " addresses vital questions of Arab identity and nationhood". He also praised the author, attributing to him "nearmythical status among western observers of the Middle East".

In the Financial Times, Malise Ruthven said the book was "an entertaining and absorbing history that manages to be far-reaching and erudite yet conversational in style". He noted the author's focus on Arabic language and military strategy as a unique combination that helped Arab expansion during the early era of Islam. Eric Ormsby reviewed the book favorably for The Wall Street Journal, praising it for extending coverage of Arab history to pre-Islamic era, which he found original. Ormsby went on to praise the style of the author, noting his ability to make sense of otherwise complex and confusing events through the use of dramatic anecdotes and concepts such as asabiyyah and wheel of fire. Although the book received only praise, Ormsby found "occasional lapses", citing the book's omission of the Saqifah, which he argued deserved more attention even though the book was not about history of Islam. Writing for The Times Literary Supplement, Christian Sahner favorably reviewed the book, describing it as "excellent". He noted that the greatest strength of the book was its focus on Arabic language. Like Sherif and Richards, he found the humour appealing, he said:

Humour is a great hallmark of the book, employed especially for frequent comparisons between things medieval and modern. For example, while explaining the decline of the Arab bluebloods of the Abbasid period and the simultaneous rise of a highly mixed, cosmopolitan society around them, he notes: "To be an Arab in ninth-century Baghdad was not unlike being a WASP in twenty-first-century New York: important to oneself, perhaps, but increasingly irrelevant to the demography of ‘Baghdad on the Subway’".

Sahner, however, was mildly critical of the author for missing historically influential groups such as Arab Christians and Arab Jews. In The American Conservative, John C. McKay hailed the book as a "magisterial survey" and a "major tour de force", and praised the author's "scholarly erudition and limpid prose [that] elucidates and illuminates an immensely difficult, nuanced, and complex subject with absolute brilliance". He lamented that the book was not published before the 2003 invasion of Iraq. In another review by McKay, this time published in Crossroads of the Corps, he described Arabs as "superb" and one of the rare magisterial works on Arab history that are written in English.

The Washington BookReview praised the book, describing it as "brilliant and fascinating". "Arabs is a much-needed addition to the existing literature on Arab history and language that provides new perspectives and insights," it added. In a review for History Today, Barnaby Rogerson lavished praise upon the book. Noting the difficult circumstances in which it was written, he compared Mackintosh-Smith to Fernand Braudel, who wrote The Mediterranean during World War II. Rogerson also compared him to both Herodotus and Al-Masudi for his "all-encompassing and recklessly discursive enthusiasm". He added:

Arabs is a dazzling achievement, born of a historian's passionate affection for his subject. It is a labour of love, achieved after a lifetime spent in Arabia [...] It is on [the] delicate knife-edge between the impact of language and political history that Mackintosh-Smith is at his most original and innovative as a historian. I have read dozens of narrative histories of the Arabs, but I have never felt so transported, so entertained and so immersed.

Rogerson also wrote for Country Life, recommending Arabs for history enthusiasts and calling it "a dazzling, virtuoso chronicle of 3,000 years of Arabic achievement". In the Claremont Review of Books, Barnaby Crowcroft described Mackintosh-Smith as "the most interesting author to grapple with his subject matter in a generation", partly due to his resistance to romantic notions of Arab unity. He particularly found the similarity drawn by the author between Arab nationalism and Islamism insightful for it showed that Formal Arabic (which is not spoken as a mother tongue) was the shared fulcrum that rendered both movements essentially "backward-looking". Crowcroft also found the author's presentation of the Arabic language as one of the Wonders of the World both powerful and refreshing. Denyse Woods, who described herself as a friend and big fan of the author, called the book magnificent. She predicted that it would be on bookshelves for hundreds of years and receive wide readership through the ages.

Reviewing it for The Jerusalem Post, Seth J. Frantzman found the book fascinating, especially the chapters on the pre-Islamic period. He noted that writing a book on the whole history of a people is a daunting task, but one that Mackintosh-Smith was able to accomplish nevertheless. "Arabs is an accessible and readable account of a complex and long history. It is so full of storytelling and blending of peoples and culture that it surmounts the challenge of trying to tell so much history in one volume," he said. In a review for Commonweal, Patrick Ryan praised the book for being "extraordinarily learned and perceptive", and named the author "the Ibn Battutah of the twenty-first century". He drew attention to the title of the book, "Arabs" rather than "the Arabs", adding that this "holds the key to its significance". Ryan was particularly fascinated by the author's use of parallels between past and present, citing the comparison between Al-Hallaj and Mahmoud Mohammed Taha. Separated by a millennium, both men were executed for their religious views.

Prince Hassan bin Talal praised the book profusely, describing it as a "breath of fresh air". He added:

[Arabs] will I hope go some way to dispelling the mistaken notion that all that is progressive originated in one quarter of the globe [...] Your retelling of the highs and lows of three millennia gives a true insight into the essence of Arab existence [...] As such it is my profound hope that it will go somehow to providing a counterbalance to the hatred industry, offering as it does insight into and respect for the other [...] Your book is also a gloriously enjoyable read and above all highlights not that which separates, but that which we share, our common heritage and our common humanity.

=== Mixed ===
In a mixed review for History: Reviews of New Books, Alexander Shelby described the book as a "valuable and well-researched study of Arab history" that is "thought-provoking". He said that few claims in the book are not backed by evidence, citing the author's assertion that Arabs may trace their origin to the Fertile Crescent. He also thought that some passages had an Orientalist taint to them, such as the statement that Arabic language has a particular ability for "mass manipulation of truth". In another mixed review, Max Rodenbeck described Arabs for The New York Review of Books as "unusual", "erudite and discursive". He said the book was not "quite a history" as its title suggests, but something else. He explained:

[R]ather than retelling the long Arab saga in full or raising quibbles with academic historians who have covered this broad sweep, such as Philip Hitti or Albert Hourani, Mackintosh-Smith sets out instead to fill in the gaps they left, to embellish the tale in bolder colors, and to arrange it in a more attractive and revealing way. He is not so much a chronicler as an engaging curator, guiding readers around a fascinating exhibition, pointing out lesser-known objects, and casting new light on burnished masterpieces.

He added that this style of the book led to some inevitable omissions, citing several topics from pre-Islamic history such as Philip the Arab, Zenobia, Ghassanids and Nabataeans. He had expected this era to receive more attention, especially since the author noted that Muhammad's message lay in the middle, not at the beginning of Arab history. Rodenbeck nevertheless concluded that book is "reward[ing] in so many other ways" and went on to explain many of the same points mentioned by favorable reviews. In Asian Affairs, Alan Mackie described Arabs as "ambitious", "discursive and fascinating". While he found the author's telling of history proficient, he nevertheless criticized him for not producing any "special insights" or speculations about the future of the Arab world and Arab identity.

=== Critical ===
Reviewing it for The Irish Times, literary critic Richard Pine said the book was "sad" and called it a "paradoxical study". He was critical of Mackintosh-Smith's criticism of Israel, which he characterized as unbalanced. He also criticized the book for being narrow, citing its omission of wider context, inadequate coverage of the Copts, and its lack of any mention of some important works on Arabic history and literature. He was also critical of the way endnotes were organized, describing them as "so impenetrable as to disaffect the enquiring reader".

Lawrence Rosen reviewed the book for The Marginalia Review of Books. He contrasted Bernard Lewis's study which had asked What Went Wrong? with that of Mackintosh-Smith which presented disunity as a pattern that repeats itself throughout Arab history. Rosen questioned the author's focus on language and Arab unity, saying it "never quite connects all the dots". He was critical of the little attention given to the role of trade and Islamic law, noting their importance to understand the full picture. Rosen characterized the author's interest in language as being closer to that of a lexicographer rather than a sociolinguist, citing his frequent use of peculiar words compared to the rarity of showing the "actual use of Arabic in social and political life". Rosen added:

The author's analysis of specific moments in Arab history may exercise specialists for years to come, but general readers perusing today's news from the region may still resonate to the author's characterization of a distinctively Arab ethos.

=== Non-English ===
Mohamed Meziane of Université Ibn-Tofail in Morocco wrote a 7-page review for Hespéris-Tamuda, in which he summarized much of the book. He praised it for avoiding superficiality, generalizations and the "arrogant Orientalist view". Meziane emphasized the importance of reading the book as a whole to understand its thesis, and praised Mackintosh-Smith's knowledge of Arab thought, soul and land, citing his use of Arab historical, literary and poetic sources such as Ibn Khaldun, Al-Jahiz, Taha Hussein and Nizar Qabbani. He noted the differentiation made by the author between Arabs and Muslims, adding that the word "Arab" is vague and denotes a heterogeneous ethnic group. Meziane was particularly fascinated by the links the author makes between past and present in order to explain recent affairs, such as the Arab Spring.

Writing for Al Jazeera, Omran Abdulla praised the book's "enrichment of the picture with fascinating details", noting the author's intimate knowledge and deep passion for Sanaa, the capital city of Yemen where he had lived for over three decades. Abdulla added that the author viewed Arab expansion during the early era of Islam as part of a historical trend of raiding and looting that continues to present day in the form of dictators such as Bashar al-Assad who loot their own people. He thought the author ignored the substantial differences between bandits and "Islamic civilizational expansion" that carried knowledge and principles of administration to conquered areas, without engaging in pillaging of local inhabitants. Philip Parker reviewed the book favorably for Le Point. Referrering to the task of writing the history of such a vast area over 3,000 years as Herculean, Parker nevertheless said the author was successful, because his analysis focused on the factors of geography, culture and, above all, language.

In Al Araby television network, Aref Hijjawi favorably reviewed the book. He was fascinated by the "breathtaking" style of the author, agreeing with The New York Times description of it: "Tim Mackintosh-Smith seems incapable of writing a dull sentence". He noted the book's insights on the origins of Arab disunity, citing the Sykes–Picot Agreement and the inability of Arabs to (re)unite following independence, because of their inherent disunity that traces all the way back to the Basus War in 5th-6th century. The translated poems earned a special mention by Hijjawi, who found them very pleasant to read with their orderly qaafiyaa, and he praised their complete faithfullness to the original meaning, citing the author's use of the 40-volume Arabic dictionary Taj al-Arus. The humorous style, love for Arabic language and heartfelt criticisms were hailed as distinct features, putting the author above any accusation of arrogant Orientalism, as characterized by Edward Said. Finally, he pleaded for the book to be translated to Arabic.

In a review for Asharq Al-Awsat, Maher Farid expressed his delight that a western researcher would have such deep knowledge of Arabic literature, citing some poems by Imru' al-Qais, Abu Tammam and Al-Ma'arri. While he praised the author for his abundant knowledge, penetrating insight and tireless research, he warned against taking his conclusions uncritically. Farid added:

Ultimately [Arabs] remains the product of a Western perspective that is foreign to Arab culture, no matter how much effort is made to understand it, approach it and sympathize with it. That is why – while we must benefit from what he says – we should take what he says on some issues [...] with a pinch of salt, always remembering what Edward Said wrote in Orientalism on the impossibility of complete objectivity in the writings of Westerners on Arabs, and the mixing of pure scientific research with other considerations, no matter how much the Western researcher seeks to remain neutral, observe fairness, and put pre-existing biases aside.

In another review for Arabs in Asharq Al-Awsat, Samir Attallah described it as a fascinating book that manages to surpass those of Philip Hitti and Albert Hourani in some aspects. He cited two insights putting Mackintosh-Smith ahead of the aforementioned authors: his remark that Arabic was only made the official language during the reign of Abd al-Malik ibn Marwan and his explanation for the relative decline of Arab science due to a combination of the Ottoman ban on printing press and difficulties in printing Arabic letters as they take different forms depending on their location. He noted the author's extensive use of both Arabic and English sources, and his contrarian views on the Shia–Sunni dispute, which he sees not as a religious conflict as much as a family dispute that developed following the death of Muhammad, and therefore a continuation of ancient tribalism and disunity.

== Recognition ==
Arabs was longlisted for the 2020 Ondaatje Prize presented by the Royal Society of Literature.
