= Harold Wilson bibliography =

James Harold Wilson, Baron Wilson of Rievaulx, KG, OBE, FRS, PC (11 March 1916 – 24 May 1995) was one of the most prominent British politicians of the 20th century.

There is an extensive bibliography on Harold Wilson. He is the author of a number of books. He is the subject of many biographies (both light and serious) and academic analyses of his career and various aspects of the policies pursued by the governments he has led. He features in many "humorous" books. He was the Prime Minister in the so-called "Swinging London" era of the 1960s, and therefore features in many of the books about this period of history.

== Principal books by Harold Wilson ==
- Wilson, Harold (1945). New deal for coal. Contact.
- Wilson, Harold (c. 1945). The finance of railway nationalisation.
- Wilson, Harold (1953). The war on world poverty: An appeal to the conscience of mankind. Victor Gollancz.
- Wilson, Harold (1957). Post-war economic policies in Britain. Fabian Society.
- Wilson, Harold; Hugh Gaitskell (1957). Remedies for inflation: a series of Manchester Guardian articles. Labour Party.
- Wilson, Harold (1964). The new Britain: Labour's plan outlined by Harold Wilson. Selected speeches 1964 Penguin Special 237. Penguin Books.
- Wilson, Harold (1964). Purpose in Politics: selected speeches by Rt. Hon. Harold Wilson. Weidenfeld and Nicolson.
- Wilson, Harold (1964). The Relevance of British Socialism. [An article reprinted from the Encyclopædia Britannica Book of the Year 1964.] Weidenfeld and Nicolson.
- Wilson, Harold (1966). Purpose in Power: selected speeches. Weidenfeld and Nicolson.
- Wilson, Harold (1971). The Labour Government 1964-1970: A personal record. Weidenfeld and Nicolson and Michael Joseph. ISBN 0-7181-0947-3.
- Wilson, Harold (1976). The Governance of Britain. Weidenfeld and Nicolson and Michael Joseph. ISBN 0-7181-1574-0.
- Wilson, Harold (1977). A Prime Minister on Prime Ministers. Weidenfeld and Nicolson and Michael Joseph. ISBN 0-7181-1625-9.
- Wilson, Harold (1979). Final Term: The Labour Government 1974-1976. Weidenfeld and Nicolson and Michael Joseph. ISBN 0-7181-1860-X.
- Wilson, Harold (1981). The Chariot of Israel: Britain, America and the State of Israel. Weidenfeld and Nicolson and Michael Joseph. ISBN 0-7181-2002-7.
- Wilson, Harold (1986). Memoirs: the making of a Prime Minister 1916-1964. Weidenfeld and Nicolson and Michael Joseph. ISBN 0-7181-2775-7.
- Wilson, Harold (1978). Proposals for the setting up of a British Film Authority: Report of the Interim Action Committee on the Film Industry. Chairman: Harold Wilson. Cmnd 7071. HMSO.
- Wilson, Harold (1948). The Road to Recovery: Fabian Society lectures given in the autumn of 1947 by Douglas Jay, Geoffrey Bing, H.J. Laski, Ian Mikardo, Harold Wilson and Richard Crossman. A. Wingate.

In addition, several speeches and articles by Wilson are listed in the COPAC catalogue.

== Selected titles about Harold Wilson ==
=== Biography ===
- Farr, Martin. ""Wilson, (James) Harold, 1st Baron Wilson 1916-1995." in Reader's Guide to British History London: Routledge, 2003. online at Credo Reference.
- Jenkins, Roy. "Wilson, (James) Harold, Baron Wilson of Rievaulx (1916–1995)," Oxford Dictionary of National Biography, Oxford University Press, 2004; online edn, Jan 2009 accessed 15 Oct 2012
- Moran, Jon. "Conspiracy and contemporary history: revisiting MI5 and the Wilson plot [s]." Journal of Intelligence History 13.2 (2014): 161–175.
- Pimlott, Ben (1992). Harold Wilson. HarperCollins. ISBN 0-00-215189-8.
- Routledge, Paul (2006). Wilson. Series: The 20 British Prime Ministers of the 20th Century. Haus Publishing. ISBN 1-904950-68-X.
- Rosen, Greg (2001). Dictionary of Labour biography. Politico's. ISBN 1-902301-18-8.
- Ziegler, Philip (1993). Wilson: The authorised life of Lord Wilson of Rievaulx. Weidenfeld and Nicolson. ISBN 0-297-81276-9.

=== Memoirs of his staff ===
- Williams, Marcia (1972). Inside Number 10. Weidenfeld and Nicolson. ISBN 0-297-99511-1.
- Falkender, Marcia (1983). Downing Street in perspective. Weidenfeld and Nicolson. ISBN 0-297-78107-3.
- Haines, Joe (1977). The politics of power. Jonathan Cape. ISBN 0-224-01405-6.
- Haines, Joe (2003). Glimmers of twilight: Murder, intrigue and passion in the court of Harold Wilson. Politico's. ISBN 1-84275-071-2.

=== Politics ===
- Crines, Andrew Scott. "Harold Wilson's rhetoric." Renewal: a Journal of Labour Politics 22.3/4 (2014): 128+ online.
- Favrettoa, Ilaria. "'Wilsonism' reconsidered: Labour party revisionism 1952–64," Contemporary British History (2000) 14#4 pages 54–80 doi:10.1080/13619460008581603
- Fielding, Steven. "Rethinking Labour's 1964 Campaign," Contemporary British History, (Sept 2007) 21#3 pp 309–324
- Fielding, Steven, ed. The Labour governments, 1964–70, volume 1: Labour and cultural change (Manchester UP, 2003).
- Foot, Paul (1968). The Politics of Harold Wilson. Penguin Special 265. Penguin Books.
- Harper, Tobias. "Harold Wilson’s ‘Lavender List’Scandal and the Shifting Moral Economy of Honour." Twentieth Century British History 31.1 (2020): 79-100.
- Heppell, Timothy. "The Labour Party leadership election of 1963: Explaining the unexpected election of Harold Wilson." Contemporary British History 24.2 (2010): 151-171.
- Irving, Henry. "The birth of a politician: Harold Wilson and the bonfires of controls, 1948–9." Twentieth century British history 25.1 (2014): 87-107. online
- King, Anthony. The British General Election of 1966 (1966).
- Lapping, Brian. The Labour Government, 1964–70 (Penguin books, 1970).
- Rosen, Greg (2005). Old Labour to New: The dreams that inspired, the battles that divided. Politico's. ISBN 1-84275-045-3.
- Wilson, Robin; Frederic Lloyd (1984). Gilbert & Sullivan – The Official D'Oyly Carte Picture History. New York: Alfred A. Knopf, Inc.
- Plant, Raymond; Matt Beech; Kevin Hickson (2004). The struggle for Labour's soul: Understanding Labour's political thought since 1945. Routledge. ISBN 0-415-31283-3.

=== Domestic policies ===
- Blick, Andrew. "Harold Wilson, Labour and the machinery of government." Contemporary British History (2006) 20#3 pp: 343-362.
- Borthwick, R.L.; Donald Shell; Richard Hodder-Williams (1995). Churchill to Major: The British Prime Ministership since 1945. Hurst & Company. ISBN 1-85065-147-7.
- Butler, D. and G. Butler (ed.). Twentieth Century British Political Facts 1900–2000.
- Cairncross, Alexander Kirkland, and Barry J. Eichengreen. Sterling in Decline: the Devaluations of 1931, 1949, and 1967 (Basil Blackwell, 1983)
- Childs, David. Britain since 1945: a political history. (Taylor & Francis, 2006)
- Crines, Andrew S., and Kevin Hickson, eds. Harold Wilson: The Unprincipled Prime Minister?: A Reappraisal of Harold Wilson (Biteback Publishing, 2016). online review
- Dorey, Peter. "The Fall of the Wilson Government, 1970." in How Labour Governments Fall: From Ramsay Macdonald to Gordon Brown (2013): 83+.
- Dorey, Pete. "‘Well, Harold Insists on Having It!’—The Political Struggle to Establish The Open University, 1965–67." Contemporary British History 29.2 (2015): 241-272. online
- Heppell, Timothy. Choosing the Labour Leader: Labour Party Leadership Elections from Wilson to Brown (2010).
- O'Hara, Glen. "'Dynamic, Exciting, Thrilling Change': the Wilson Government's Economic Policies, 1964–70," Contemporary British History, (Sept 2006) 20#3 pp 383–402
- Parr, Helen; Glen O’Hara (2006). The Wilson governments 1964-1970 reconsidered. Routledge. ISBN 0-415-35634-2.
- Rogers, Chris. (2011) "Economic Policy and the Problem of Sterling under Harold Wilson and James Callaghan," Contemporary British History (2011) 25#3 pp 339–363.
- Warner, Geoffrey. "Putting pressure on O'Neill: the Wilson government and Northern Ireland 1964–69." Irish Studies Review (2005) 13#1 pp: 13-31.

=== Foreign and military policies ===
- Broad, Matthew. Harold Wilson, Denmark and the Making of Labour European Policy, 1958-72 (Oxford UP, 2018).
- Coggins, Richard. "Wilson and Rhodesia: UDI and British policy towards Africa." Contemporary British History (2006) 20#3 pp: 363-381.
- Colman, Jonathan (2004). A 'special relationship'?: Harold Wilson, Lyndon B. Johnson and Anglo-American relations 'at the summit', 1964-68. University of Manchester Press. ISBN 0-7190-7010-4.
- Colman, Jonathan. "Harold Wilson, Lyndon Johnson and Anglo-American 'summit diplomacy', 1964–68." Journal of Transatlantic Studies (2003) 1#2 pp: 131-151.
- Daddow, Oliver, ed. (2002). Harold Wilson and European integration: Britain's second application to join the EEC. Frank Cass Publishers. ISBN 0-7146-5222-9.
- Daddow, Oliver (2000). Rhetoric and reality: The historiography of British European policy, 1945-73. University of Nottingham.
- Dockrill, Saki. "Forging the Anglo-American global defence partnership: Harold Wilson, Lyndon Johnson and the Washington summit, December 1964." Journal of Strategic Studies (2000) 23#4 pp: 107-129.
- Dockrill, Saki. "Britain's power and influence: Dealing with three roles and the Wilson government's defence debate at Chequers in November 1964." Diplomacy and Statecraft (2000) 11#1 pp: 211-240.
- Doyle, Suzanne. "A Foregone Conclusion? The United States, Britain and the Trident D5 Agreement." Journal of Strategic Studies 40.6 (2017): 867-894. online
- Gill, David James. Britain and the bomb: nuclear diplomacy, 1964-1970 (Stanford University Press, 2014).
- Gill, David James. (2011) "The Ambiguities of Opposition: Economic Decline, International Cooperation, and Political Rivalry in the Nuclear Policies of the Labour Party, 1963-1964," Contemporary British History (2011) 25# 2 pp 251–276
- Haeussler, Mathias. "A pyrrhic victory: Harold Wilson, Helmut Schmidt, and the British renegotiation of EC membership, 1974–5." International History Review 37.4 (2015): 768-789. online
- Hughes, Geraint. Harold Wilson's Cold War: The Labour Government and East-West Politics, 1964-1970 (Boydell & Brewer Ltd, 2015).
- Llewelyn, James. "Steadfast Yet Reluctant Allies: Japan and the United Kingdom in the Vietnam War," Diplomacy and Statecraft (2011) 22#4 pp 608–633.
- Oliver, Michael J. (2011) "The Management of Sterling, 1964–1967," English Historical Review (June 2011) 126#520 pp 582–613.
- Parr, Helen (2006). Britain's policy toward the European community: Harold Wilson and Britain's world role, 1964-1967. Routledge. ISBN 0-7146-5614-3.
- Pine, Melissa. Harold Wilson and Europe: Pursuing Britain's Membership of the European Community (IB Tauris, 2007)
- Robb, Thomas. (2011) "The 'Limit of What is Tolerable': British Defence Cuts and the 'Special Relationship,' 1974-1976," Diplomacy and Statecraft (2011) 22#2 pp 321–337.
- Rogers, Chris. "Economic Policy and the Problem of Sterling under Harold Wilson and James Callaghan," Contemporary British History (2011) 25#3 pp 339–363.
- Spelling, Alex. "'A Reputation for Parsimony to Uphold': Harold Wilson, Richard Nixon and the Re-Valued 'Special Relationship’1969–1970." Contemporary British History (2013) 27#2 pp: 192-213.
- Stoddart, Kristan. "The British Labour Government and the development of Chevaline, 1974–79." Cold War History 10.3 (2010): 287-314.
- Stoddart, Kristan. "The Wilson government and British responses to anti-ballistic missiles, 1964–1970." Contemporary British History 23.1 (2009): 1-33.
- Vickers, Rhiannon. "Harold Wilson, the British Labour Party, and the War in Vietnam." Journal of Cold War Studies(2008) 10#2 pp: 41-70.
- Walker, John R. Britain and Disarmament: The UK and Nuclear, Biological and Chemical Weapons Arms Control and Programmes, 1956-1975 (Ashgate, 2012).
- Wall, Stephen. The Official History of Britain and the European Community, Volume III: The Tiger Unleashed, 1975-1985 (Routledge, 2018).
- Wilson, Craig. "Rhetoric, reality and dissent: The Vietnam policy of the British labour government, 1964–1970." Social Science Journal (1986) 23#1 pp: 17-31.

=== Swinging London ===
- Nuttall, Jeff (1968). Bomb culture. MacGibbon & Kee. ISBN 0-261-62617-5.
- Levin, Bernard (1970). The Pendulum Years. Jonathan Cape. ISBN 0-224-61963-2.
- Melly, George (1970). Revolt into Style. Allen Lane. ISBN 0-7139-0166-7.
- Sandbrook, Dominic (2006). White heat: A history of Britain in the swinging sixties. Little, Brown. ISBN 0-316-72452-1.
- Sandbrook, Dominic (2005). Never had it so good: A history of Britain from Suez to the Beatles. Little, Brown. ISBN 0-316-86083-2.

=== "Humour" ===
- Ingrams, Richard; John Wells (1975). Mrs Wilson's Diary. Private Eye and André Deutsch. ISBN 0-233-96747-8.
- Ingrams, Richard; John Wells (1966). Mrs Wilson's Second Diary. Private Eye.
- Kay, Ernest (1967). The Wit of Harold Wilson. Leslie Frewin.
- Ali, Tariq (1967). The thoughts of Chairman Harold. Gnome Press.
- Penn, Richard (1965). The Harold Wilson Bunkside Book. Leslie Frewin.
- Penn, Richard (1966). The new Harold Wilson Bunkside Book. Oldbourne Press.
- Penn, Richard (1967). The bedside cabinet book. Macdonald & Co.
- Quit, Amos (1969). The Harold Wilson way out book. Leslie Frewin. ISBN 0-09-100000-9.
