= History of Syria: Including Lebanon and Palestine =

History of Syria including Lebanon and Palestine is a book written by Philip Khuri Hitti and published in 1951.

Amazon.com writes about it:

A brilliant history of the land into which more historical and cultural events were crowded than perhaps into any area of equal size. For Syria has either invented or transmitted to mankind such benefits as monotheistic religion, philosophy, law, trade, agriculture and our alphabet.
