= A History of the Arab Peoples =

1991 history book by Albert Hourani

- Author: Albert Hourani
- Language: English
- Subject: History of Arab countries
- Publisher: Faber and Faber
- Publication date: February 18, 1991
- Publication place: United Kingdom
- Media type: Print (hardcover)
- Pages: 576
- ISBN: 978-0-674-39565-7
- Dewey Decimal: 909.0974927
- LC Class: DS37.7.H67

A History of the Arab Peoples is a book written from 1991 by the British-born Lebanese historian Albert Hourani.

The book presents the history of the Arabs from the advent of Islam (although some pre-Islamic history is included) to the late 20th Century. More recent editions contain an afterword by Malise Ruthven bringing the history up to the present day including the Invasion of Iraq.

== See also ==
- History of the Arabs by Philip K. Hitti
- The Arabs in History by Bernard Lewis
