= The Chariot of Israel =

1981 book by Harold Wilson

The Chariot of Israel: Britain, America and the State of Israel
- Author: Harold Wilson
- Language: English
- Subject: History; Diplomacy
- Publisher: Weidenfeld & Nicolson and Michael Joseph (UK), W. W. Norton & Company (US)
- Publication date: May 1981
- Publication place: United Kingdom
- Media type: Print
- Pages: 406
- ISBN: 978-0-7181-2002-3 hardcover
- OCLC: 9080769

The Chariot of Israel: Britain, America and the State of Israel is a 1981 book by the British politician and former Prime Minister Harold Wilson about the relationship and foreign policy of the United Kingdom and the United States towards Israel. The book includes Wilson's personal account of his role in the Six-Day War in 1967. It received mixed reviews upon publication.

It was published in May 1981 by Weidenfeld & Nicolson and Michael Joseph in the United Kingdom and in 1982 by W. W. Norton & Company in the United States.

Wilson's biographer Ben Pimlott wrote that the book "drily appraised relations between the three states". The British businessman and Wilson confidant Lord Kissin said at the launch party for the book that Wilson had "written the book with all his heart and put everything of himself into the job".

Wilson attended a book signing event for The Chariot of Israel at Selfridges department store on Oxford Street in London in May 1981.

== Reception ==
It was reviewed by Richard Owen in The Times. Owen was critical of the need for another book about the rise in Zionism and the foundation of Israel feeling "neither of which can reasonably be said to have been neglected by previous authors" and that it is "only toward the end that the book takes on some life" when Wilson "enters the stage as a figure in the drama of Israel's struggle for existence" in his account of the Six-Day War in 1967. Wilson recounts in detail the telephone conversations between himself and the American President Lyndon B. Johnson, the President of France Charles de Gaulle, and the Soviet Premier Alexei Kosygin. Wilson was critical of De Gaulle's sympathy toward Arab countries. Owen wrote that with the speed with which Israel won the war rendered "a lot of this to-ing and fro-ing irrelevant" and that the Western leaders "couldn't make up [their] mind how to respond" to the blockade of the Straits of Tiran by the Egyptian President Gamal Abdel Nasser. Wilson told Roy Jenkins, who served as Home Secretary and Chancellor of the Exchequer under Wilson, during his reservations about the war that "Look Roy", I said, "I've accommodated your (expletive deleted) conscience for years. Now you're going to have to take account of mine – I feel as strongly about the Middle East as you do about the Common Market". Jenkins subsequently described the book as "one of the most strongly Zionist tracts ever written by a non-Jew".

The book received a mixed review in Kirkus Reviews upon publication. Kirkus felt that Wilson narrated the history of the relationship between the United Kingdom and Israel "without stirring up much fuss or adding anything significant to our understanding of Israel's origins" and "As a Prime Minister, Wilson was cautious and noncommittal; and so he is here". Wilson was sympathetic in his book to the Balfour Declaration and Kirkus felt that he failed to explore the "enormous muddle created by the Declaration's ambiguity, aside from the presumptions of the British in issuing it". Wilson also wrote about the "interminable wrangling" and the resultant limited foreign policy of the Attlee administration which enabled the United States under President Harry Truman to "take the initiative". Wilson endorses Hugh Gaitskell's position on the Suez Crisis that it should have been handled by the United Nations and the legitimacy of the original British position of the "inviolability" of the canal.

The Chariot of Israel was reviewed alongside John Darwin's Britain, Egypt and the Middle East in The Economist. The reviewer wrote of The Chariot of Israel that the book "tends towards the anecdotal" and that "as a whole is a very fair and competent account" and a "sober work". Wilson critiqued the policies of the Israeli Prime Minister Menachem Begin at the conclusion of the book.

The book received an extremely critical review in The New York Times from the historian Thurston Clarke in June 1982. Clarke wrote that it "cannot be classified as history, if history implies a systematic and essentially accurate account of the past, coupled with an attempt at analysis and explanation. A fourth of the book is composed of excerpts, some as long as four pages, taken from official reports, parliamentary debates and the memoirs of other statesmen. There is practically no attempt to analyze them or even to explain their relevance". Clarke noted that the book failed to discuss the White Paper of 1939 that proposed to restrict Jewish immigration to Britain from Palestine feeling that it "sheds little new light on these questions, or on others that are still hotly disputed, like Britain's aims and motivations in the Suez crisis or the Six-Day War. What, then, does this book accomplish? Or, for that matter, what is it really about?".

Clarke was critical of Wilson's historiographical method, noting that Wilson "conducted few interviews, never consulted the official papers on file at the Public Record Office and that most of his chapters paraphrase the books and speeches of others" and that "on the infrequent occasion when [Wilson] voices an opinion, one often finds that it is unsupported, or even contradicted, by the evidence provided". Wilson fails to note from his perspective his "urgent meeting" with the Israeli Foreign Minister Abba Eban before the start of the Six-Day War but includes "without comment or criticism" a long account from Eban's memoirs of the encounter and makes no note of his discussions with the United Nations Secretary-General U Thant in New York shortly before the war began. Clarke concluded that Wilson "should consider that long after he departs" The Chariot of Israel will be "cluttering library shelves, available to historians and biographers searching for clues to his views on the Middle East and his character and intelligence. If I were Sir Harold, I would find this a chilling thought".

The book also received a critical review from Paul Foot in The Spectator. Foot noted that the book contained only a single reference to the Palestinian people, as part of a 1973 speech that Wilson made in which he referred to "the Palestinians who lost their homes in what they regard as the land of their fathers in 1948. This is a problem that I have constantly raised..." which Foot feels is "a 'problem', however, which [Wilson] constantly does not raise in his book". Foot felt that Wilson neglected the exodus of the Palestinian people and the fate of the Palestinian refugees in the aftermath of the 1948 Arab–Israeli War as well as neglecting to mention the Deir Yassin massacre and the failure to implement the United Nations Partition Plan for Palestine in 1947. Foot felt that to "Leave the Palestinian Arabs out of this, and there is no limit to the rewriting of history". Foot notes that Wilson is especially critical of Ernest Bevin, the British Foreign Secretary in the aftermath of the Arab-Israeli war who according to Foot "tried without success to stem the Zionist tide". Foot felt that "In all this time, [Wilson's] basic sympathies were with Israel but he could see that the Arabs and the Palestinians had a point of view". Foot writes that "As Wilson recognises in a footnote, many socialists who supported Zionism in the late 1940s came to adapt their position, and to sympathise more with the Arabs as Israel continued her conquests and her occupations" but Wilson "moved in the opposite direction". Foot felt that Wilson became distinctly more sympathetic to Zionism and the Israeli government during the 1970s as a result of his friendship with British businessmen who were sympathetic to the Israeli government with Foot feeling that "Wilson became an unswerving Zionist at the time when the Zionist case was at its weakest, His book is an attempt to establish that case. It ends with a pathetic little postscript in which he voices his 'anxieties' about Israel".
