= Philip Ziegler =

British biographer and historian (1929–2023)

Philip Ziegler CVO FRSL

Personal details
- Born: Philip Sandeman Ziegler; 24 December 1929 Ringwood, Hampshire, England
- Died: 22 February 2023 (aged 93)

Philip Sandeman Ziegler (24 December 1929 – 22 February 2023) was a British biographer and historian.

== Background ==
Ziegler was born in Ringwood, Hampshire on 24 December 1929, the son of Louis Ziegler, an Army officer, and Dora Barnwell, a homemaker. He was educated at St Cyprian's School, Eastbourne, and went with the school when it merged with Summer Fields School, Oxford. He attended Eton College and New College, Oxford, graduating in 1951 with a first class degree in Jurisprudence from Oxford before joining the British Foreign Service. In the Foreign Service, he served in Vientiane, where he worked with the US ambassador to Laos Charles W. Yost, and also to Pretoria, and Bogotá, as well as with the Delegation to NATO in Paris.

== Writing career ==
In 1967, he resigned from the Foreign Service and joined the publishers Collins, which was, at the time, run by his father-in-law. Originally intending to be a novelist, he began a career as biographer with his life of Talleyrand's lover, the Duchess of Dino. He was editor in chief at Collins from 1979 to 1980. He was chosen as official biographer of Edward VIII, for which he was later appointed CVO. Ziegler wrote for various journals and newspapers, including The Spectator, The Listener, The Times, The Daily Telegraph and History Today.

== Personal life and death ==
In 1967, gunmen broke into Ziegler's family home in Bogotá and shot dead his wife, Sarah Collins. Ziegler was wounded in the attack. He then married social worker Mary Clare Charrington in 1971; she died in 2017.

Ziegler died from cancer on 22 February 2023, at the age of 93.

=== Works ===
- Duchess of Dino (1962) on Princess Dorothea of Courland
- Addington: A Life of Henry Addington, First Viscount Sidmouth (1965)
- The Black Death (1969)
- King William IV (1971)
- Omdurman (1973)
- Melbourne: a Biography of William Lamb 2nd Viscount Melbourne (1976) on Lord Melbourne the Prime Minister
- Crown and People (1978)
- Diana Cooper (1981)
- Mountbatten. The Official Biography (1985)
- Elizabeth's Britain 1926 to 1986 (1986)
- Diaries of Lord Louis Mountbatten 1920–1922: Tours with the Prince of Wales (1987) editor
- Personal Diary of Admiral the Lord Louis Mountbatten, South-East Asia, 1943–1946 (1988)
- The Sixth Great Power: Barings 1762–1929 (1988)
- From Shore to Shore – The Final Years: The Diaries of Earl Mountbatten of Burma 1953–1979 (1989)
- Edward VIII, the Official Biography (1990)
- Brooks's: A Social History (1991) editor with Desmond Seward
- Wilson: The Authorised Life of Lord Wilson of Rievaulx (1993) on Harold Wilson
- London at War 1939–1945 (1995)
- Osbert Sitwell (1998)
- Britain Then and Now: The Francis Frith Collection (1999)
- Soldiers: Fighting Men's Lives, 1901–2001 (2001)
- Rupert Hart-Davis: Man of Letters (2004)
- Legacy: Cecil Rhodes, The Rhodes Trust and Rhodes Scholarships (2008)
- Edward Heath (2010) ISBN 978-0-00-724740-0
- Olivier (2013)
- George VI (Penguin Monarchs): The Dutiful King (2015) ISBN 978-0141977379
- Between the Wars: 1919–1939 (2016) ISBN 978-0857055217

== See also ==
- Harold Wilson: Bibliography#Selected titles about Harold Wilson
