= Tim Mackintosh-Smith =

British Arabist and writer

- Born: 17 July 1961; Bristol, England, UK
- Education: Oxford University; Clifton College
- Occupations: Writer, traveller, lecturer, translator
- Writing career
- Years active: From 1998
- Notable works: Arabs: A 3,000-Year History of Peoples, Tribes and Empires

Tim Mackintosh-Smith (born 17 July 1961) is a British Arabist, writer, traveller, lecturer and translator. He has written numerous books on the Middle East, won several awards and has presented a major BBC television series.

== Early life and education ==
Mackintosh-Smith grew up in Bristol, where he attended Clifton College from 1971 to 1978, followed by a musical scholarship to the University of Oxford, where he read Classical Arabic.

== Career ==
From 1982 to 2019, Mackintosh-Smith lived in an ancient tower house off the "Market of the Cows" in the old city of San'a, Yemen. As a consequence of the civil war in Yemen, he had to leave this home and temporarily relocate to Malaysia. He is the author of the travel books Yemen: Travels in Dictionaryland (1997) and Yemen: The Unknown Arabia (2000). Further, he is one of the foremost scholars of the Moroccan medieval scholar Ibn Battuta. Mackintosh-Smith has published a trilogy recounting Ibn Battuta's journeys as published in his Rihla: Travels with a Tangerine (2001), The Hall of a Thousand Columns (2005) and Landfalls (2010). He has additionally written widely on subjects as broad as alabaster, the collection of frankincense, the stories of M.R. James and the history of umbrellas.

Mackintosh-Smith presented a major BBC documentary series Travels with a Tangerine (2007), recounting his experiences tracing Ibn Battutah's fourteenth-century travels in the present day. He was featured in a documentary film The English Sheik and the Yemeni Gentleman.

Mackintosh-Smith has won several awards. Yemen: Travels in Dictionary Land, won the 1998 Thomas Cook Travel Book Award. The Daily Telegraph has described him as "the sage of Sana'a." He has also written about the history of the Arab people and their cultures in his Arabs: A 3,000-Year History of Peoples, Tribes and Empires (2019). In this "history of Arabs", avoiding the general notion of 'the Arabs', he dedicated an important part of the 630 pages to the pre-Islamic times of documented Arab history, that is the 1,400 years before Muhammad, and discussed the influence this long period brought about for the following 1,400 years of Arab history since then. Attributing less importance to the concept of Arabs as an homogeneous and discrete ethnic group, he stressed the importance of the Arabic language as "the strongest link" in Arab history and present.
