= Nazih Ayubi =

Egyptian writer

Nazih Al-Ayubi
- Nazih Nassif Mikhail Ayubi
- Born: 1944
- Died: 1995 (aged 50–51)
- Education: Cairo University

Nazih Al-Ayubi (1944 in Cairo – 1995), is an Egyptian writer who had obtained a BSc (1964) and MSc (1968) in Political Science from Cairo University, PhD in political science from the University of Oxford in England. He taught at the University of California, Los Angeles, and the University of Exeter in England. Ayoubi's areas of interest included political economy, Egyptian politics, international relations, and the international politics of Islamic countries. Al-Ayoubi played an important role in the development of the field of Middle Eastern studies in the universities in which he taught, and his classic work "Amplifying the Arab State" became an indispensable reference for political studies in the region.
