= Richard Spencer (journalist) =

British journalist

- Born: Richard John Spencer; 3 June 1965 (age 61); United Kingdom
- Education: Lincoln College, Oxford
- Occupation: Journalist
- Writing career
- Genre: Journalism

Richard John Spencer (born 3 June 1965) is a British journalist. He is the Middle East Editor for The Times and was previously in the same post for The Daily Telegraph.

== Biography ==
Spencer was educated at Sherborne School and Lincoln College, Oxford.

He was for six years the Telegraph's Beijing correspondent and was the first Western journalist to reach Yingxiu after the 2008 Sichuan earthquake in which 80% of the town had been destroyed. He then moved to Dubai to become one of their Middle East correspondents. He moved to Cairo in the wake of the Arab Spring for ease of coverage. He left The Telegraph in August 2016. He joined The Times in 2016 and is based in Beirut. He was nominated for Foreign Reporter of the Year in the National Press Awards for 2018.

Spencer is married to writer and poet, Dr Helen Wing; they have three children.
