= Albert Hourani =

Lebanese-British historian (1915–1993)

Albert Hourani CBE
- ألبرت حبيب حوراني
- Born: Albert Habib Hourani; 31 March 1915; Manchester, Lancashire, England, United Kingdom
- Died: 17 January 1993 (aged 77); Oxford, Oxfordshire, England, United Kingdom
- Resting place: Wolvercote Cemetery, Oxford
- Education: Magdalen College, Oxford
- Occupations: Civil servant, historian, lecturer
- Spouse: Christine Wegg-Prosser (m. 1955)
- Children: 1
- Relatives: George Hourani (brother)
- Writing career
- Years active: 1946–93
- Notable work: A History of the Arab Peoples (1991)

Albert Habib Hourani, CBE (Arabic: ألبرت حبيب حوراني Albart Ḥabīb Ḥūrānī; 31 March 1915 – 17 January 1993) was a Lebanese British historian, specialising in the history of the Middle East and Middle Eastern studies.

== Background and education ==
Hourani was born in Manchester, England, the son of Soumaya Rassi and Fadlo Hourani, immigrants from Marjeyoun in what is now South Lebanon (see Lebanese diaspora). Fadlo had studied at the Syrian Protestant College and settled in Manchester as a cotton merchant. Albert's brothers were George Hourani, philosopher, historian, and classicist, and Cecil Hourani, economic adviser to President of Tunisia Habib Bourguiba. His family had converted from Eastern Orthodoxy to Scottish Presbyterianism and his father became an elder of the local church in Manchester. Hourani himself, in turn, converted to Catholicism in adulthood. Fadlo had extensive business contacts with the Levantine community both in Manchester and in the Ottoman Empire, and Cecil Hourani commented on the household's mixed Anglo-Levantine culture:

... to my earliest memories in Manchester there were two faces: the one Near Eastern, Lebanese, full of poetry, politics, and business; the other partly Scottish Presbyterian, full of Sunday church-going and Sunday school, partly English through an English nanny and a succession of English and Irish cooks and maids.

Fadlo Hourani tried to enroll Albert into a preparatory school in Manchester but it did not accept him as it did not take 'foreigners'; Fadlo instead opened an alternative school in which Albert studied until the age of fourteen. He later studied at Mill Hill School, London before attending Magdalen College, Oxford, where he studied Philosophy, Politics, Economics and History (with an emphasis on international relations in the politics section of the degree), graduating first in his class in 1936.

The academic H. A. R. Gibb was among his mentors.

== Career ==
He taught in 1938–39 at the American University of Beirut, the first time he had lived in an Arabic speaking country In World War II he worked at the Royal Institute of International Affairs (aka Chatham House) and in the office of the British Minister of State in Cairo. When in Cairo, Hourani rented a room in Paul Kraus's house; in 1944 Kraus was found hanged in his bathroom for an alleged suicide.

After the war's end, he worked at the Arab Office in Jerusalem and London, where he helped prepare the Arab case for the Anglo-American Committee of Inquiry. Although he developed a liberal Arab nationalist sensibility as his education about the Middle East deepened, Hourani described himself as originally an unquestioning English liberal.

He began his academic career, which would occupy the rest of his life, in 1948, teaching at Magdalen College, St. Antony's College (where he created and directed the college's Middle East Centre), the American University of Beirut, the University of Chicago, the University of Pennsylvania, and Harvard. He ended his academic career as Fellow of St. Antony's and Reader in the History of the Modern Middle East at Oxford. Hourani trained more academic historians of the modern Middle East than any other university historian of his generation. Today his students can be found on the faculties of LSE, Oxford, Cambridge, Harvard, Yale, University of Pennsylvania, Columbia, MIT and the University of Haifa, among others. He was appointed CBE in the 1980 Birthday Honours.

== Influence on Middle Eastern studies ==
According to historian Rashid Khalidi (quoted from within a series of essays gathered originally for a conference in Hourani's honor), "Hourani's students, and their students, have over the last few decades effectively populated and then produced the core of the field of modern Middle East history in North America and Europe, and parts of the Middle East and other regions as well (2016)".

Hourani's most popular work is A History of the Arab Peoples (1991), a readable introduction to the history of the Middle East and an international best seller. Arabic Thought in the Liberal Age 1789–1939 (1962) is one of the first scientific attempts at a comprehensive analysis of the nahda, the Arab revival of the 19th century, and the opening of the Arab world to modern European culture; it remains one of the major works on this subject. Syria and Lebanon. A Political Essay (1946) and Minorities in the Arab World (1947) are other major works. He also wrote extensive works on the orientalist perspective on Middle Eastern cultures through the 18th and 19th centuries, and he developed the influential concept of the "urban notables" – political and social elites in provincial Middle Eastern cities and towns that served as intermediaries between imperial capitals (such as Istanbul under the Ottoman Turks) and provincial society.

The top book prize in the Middle Eastern studies field is named the Albert Hourani Book Award and it is given annually by the Middle East Studies Association of North America (MESA). Hourani was an Honorary Fellow of both MESA and the American Historical Association (AHA).

Among his students are Abbas Amanat, Nazih Ayubi, Aziz al-Azmeh, Michael Gilsenan, Rashid Khalidi, Afaf Lutfi al-Sayyid Marsot, Roger Owen, Ilan Pappé, and André Raymond (and others).

== Personal life ==
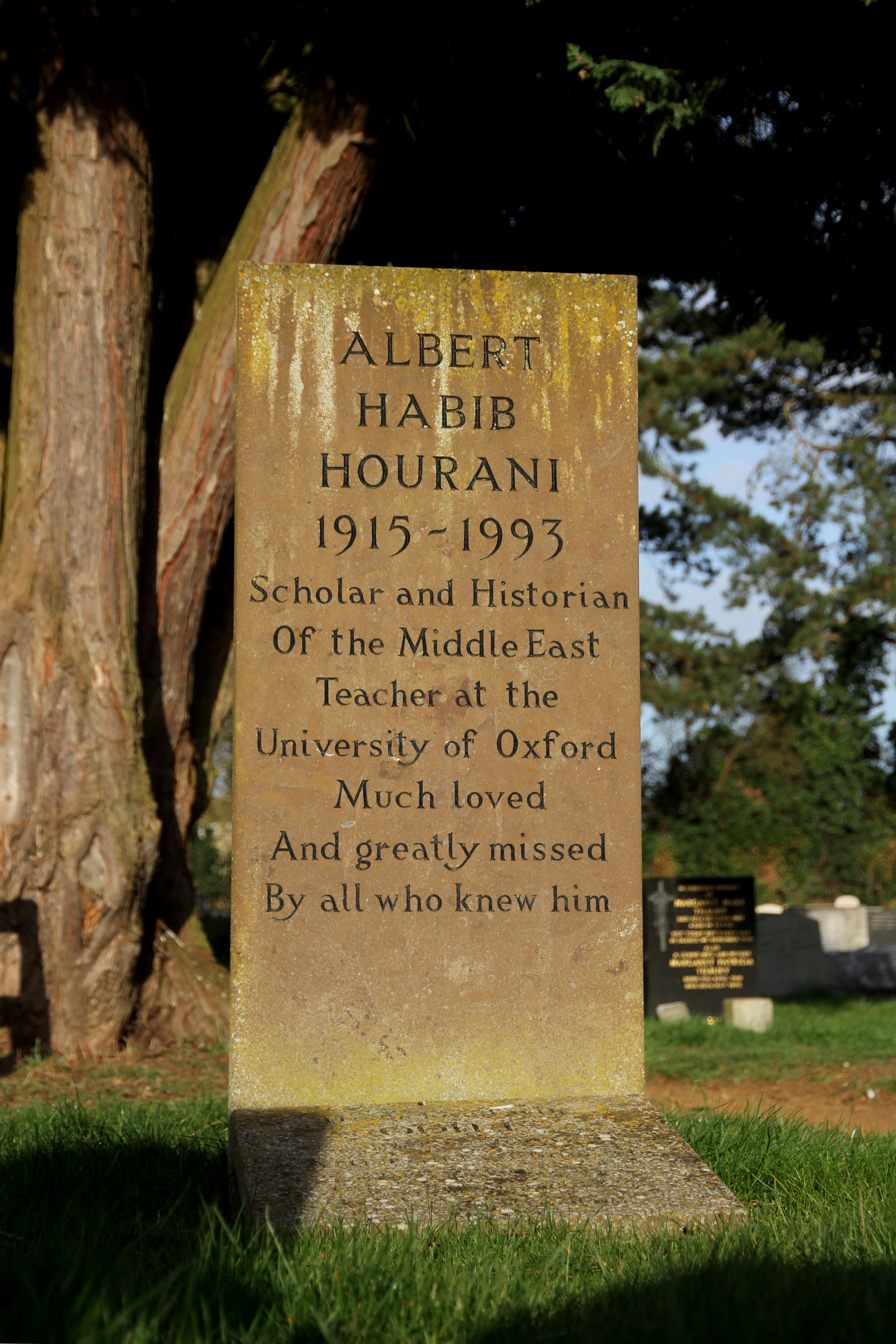
Hourani's headstone in Wolvercote Cemetery, Oxford

In 1955 Hourani married Christine Mary Odile Wegg-Prosser (1914–2003), while teaching at Magdalen College, Oxford. He died in Oxford in 1993 at the age of 77. His widow died in 2003 at the age of 89. Both are buried in Wolvercote Cemetery in Oxford.

They had a daughter, Susanna Hourani, who became professor of pharmacology and Head of Department in the School of Biomedical and Molecular Sciences of the University of Surrey.

== Works ==
- Hourani, Albert (1992). A History of the Arab Peoples. Harvard University Press. ISBN 978-0-674-01017-8.
- Hourani, Albert (1983). Arabic Thought in the Liberal Age 1798–1939. Cambridge University Press. ISBN 978-1-107-71711-4.
- Hourani, Albert (1982). Minorities in the Arab World. AMS Press. ISBN 978-0-404-16402-7.
- Hourani, Albert (1980). Europe and the Middle East. University of California Press. ISBN 978-0-520-03742-7.
- Hourani, Albert (1967). "Islam and the philosophers of history". Middle Eastern Studies. 3 (3): 206–268. doi:10.1080/00263206708700074. ISSN 0026-3206.
- Hourani, Albert (1966). "Lebanon from feudalism to modern state". Middle Eastern Studies. 2 (3): 256–263. doi:10.1080/00263206608700048. ISSN 0026-3206.
- Hourani, Albert Habib; Talmon, Jacob Leib (1968). Israel and the Arabs. J.B. Holters.

== Sources ==
- "The Case against a Jewish State in Palestine: Albert Hourani's Statement to the Anglo-American Committee of Enquiry of 1946". Journal of Palestine Studies. 35 (1): 80–90. Autumn 2005. doi:10.1525/jps.2005.35.1.80. eISSN 1533-8614. ISSN 0377-919X.
- Al-Sudairi, Abdulaziz A. A Vision of the Middle East: An Intellectual Biography of Albert Hourani. London: I.B. Tauris.
- Brown, J.A.O.C.; Gibson, Bryan (2017). An Analysis of Albert Hourani's A History of the Arab Peoples. CRC Press. ISBN 978-1-351-35231-4.
- Khalidi, Walid (2005). "On Albert Hourani, the Arab Office, and the Anglo-American Committee of 1946". Journal of Palestine Studies. 35 (1): 60–79. doi:10.1525/jps.2005.35.1.60.
- Khalidi, Rashid (1993). "Albert Hourani, 1915–1993". Review of Middle East Studies. 27 (1): 1–3. doi:10.1017/S002631840002650X. ISSN 0026-3184.
- Nachmani, Amikam (1997). "A Rare Testimony: Albert Hourani and the Anglo-American Committee, 1946". In Pappé, Ilan; Ma'oz, Moshe (eds.). Middle Eastern Politics and Ideas: A History from Within. I.B Tauris. ISBN 9781860640124.
- Owen, Roger (1997). "Albert Hourani the Historian". In Pappé, Ilan; Ma'oz, Moshe (eds.). Middle Eastern Politics and Ideas: A History from Within. I.B Tauris. ISBN 9781860640124.
- Piterberg, Gaby (1997). "Albert Hourani and Orientalism". In Pappé, Ilan; Ma'oz, Moshe (eds.). Middle Eastern Politics and Ideas: A History from Within. I.B Tauris. ISBN 9781860640124.
