= History of the Arabs (book) =

1937 book by Philip Khuri Hitti

- Title page for History of the Arabs (10th edition)
- Author: Philip Khuri Hitti
- Publisher: Macmillan Group
- Publication date: 1937
- Publication place: United States
- Pages: 767
- Text: History of the Arabs online

History of the Arabs is a book written by Philip Khuri Hitti and was first published in 1937. Hitti spent 10 years writing this book.

According to Hitti's own account, in 1927 the editor Daniel Macmillan, the brother of Harold Macmillan, wrote to Philip Hitti asking him to write a history of the Arabs. Hitti agreed, estimating that it would take him three years to complete the book, but the task actually took him 10 years. Although its editor originally hesitated to publish even a hundred copies of this book, the book has gone through ten published editions since then.

In his History of the Arabs, Hitti denies the idea of an Arab army destroyed by Charles Martel, stressing that the caliph had just died and that these Arabs preferred Spain to more northerly areas. For him, it is not the defeat of the Arabs which enabled the possibility of the Occident, as if the Arabs had to be defeated so that the Occident could exist. Instead, it is the transmission of the knowledge of the Mediterranean basin and beyond, and thus the dialogue between the two banks of the Mediterranean, which leads to the foundation of the Occident.

== Reviews ==
History of the Arabs has been described as an excellent work while keeping in mind that its bulk was written in 1937 making the citations hard to use.

== Sources ==
- Philip Khuri Hitti, History of the Arabs, Revised: 10th Edition, Palgrave Macmillan; (September 6, 2002) ISBN 0-333-63142-0
