= Philip K. Hitti =

Lebanese-American professor (1886–1978)

Philip Khuri Hitti (Arabic: فيليب خوري حتي; 22 June 1886 – 24 December 1978) was a Lebanese-American professor and scholar at Princeton and Harvard University, and authority on Arab and Middle Eastern history, Islam, and Semitic languages. He almost single-handedly created the discipline of Arabic studies in the United States. His grandniece was Christa McAuliffe, who was killed in the Space Shuttle Challenger disaster in January 1986.

== Biography ==
=== Early life ===
Philip Khuri Hitti was born in the Mount Lebanon Mutasarrifate, on 22 June 1886, into a Maronite Christian family, in the village of Shemlan some 25 km southeast from Beirut, up in Mount Lebanon.

=== Education and academic career ===
He was educated at an American Presbyterian mission school at Suq al-Gharb and then at the Syrian Protestant College. After graduating in 1908 he taught there before moving to Columbia University, where he earned his PhD in 1915 and taught Semitic languages. After World War I he returned to Lebanon and taught there until 1926. In February 1926 he was offered a Chair at Princeton University, which he held until he retired in 1954. During World War II, he taught Arabic to servicemen at Princeton through the Army Specialized Training Program (including future Ambassador Rodger Paul Davies). Hitti was both Professor of Semitic Literature and Chairman of the Department of Oriental Languages. After formal retirement he accepted a position at Harvard University. He also taught in the summer schools at the University of Utah and George Washington University in Washington, D.C. He subsequently held a research position at the University of Minnesota. He died in Princeton, New Jersey, on 24 December 1978.

==== Opinion on Arab-Jewish conflict over Palestine ====
In 1944 before a U. S. House committee, Hitti gave testimony in support of the view that there was no historical justification for a Jewish homeland in the Palestine. His testimony was reprinted in the Princeton Herald. In response, Albert Einstein and his friend and colleague Erich Kahler jointly replied in the same newspaper with their counter-arguments. Hitti then published a response and Einstein and Kahler concluded the debate in the Princeton Herald with their second response. In 1945 Hitti served as an adviser to the Iraqi delegation at the San Francisco Conference which established the United Nations. In 1946, Hitti was the first Lebanese-American witness at the Anglo-American Committee of Inquiry on Palestine. Bartley Crum, an American member of the committee, recalled:

Hitti... explained that there was actually no such entity as Palestine - never had been; it was historically part of Syria, and "the Sunday schools have done a great deal of harm to us because by smearing the walls of classrooms with maps of Palestine, they associate it with the Jews in the minds of the average American and Englishman."
He traced the history of Palestine back 7000 years. All that time, he said, it had been the immemorial home of the Arabs. He asserted that Zionism was indefensible and unfeasible on moral, historic and practical grounds. It was an imposition on the Arabs of an alien way of life which they resented and to which they would never submit.

== Works ==
- The Syrians in America (1924)
- The origins of the Druze people and religion: with extracts from their sacred writings (1928)
- An Arab-Syrian Gentleman in the Period of the Crusades: Memoirs of Usamah ibn-Munqidh (1929)
- History of the Arabs (1937)
- The Arabs: A Short History (1943)
- History of Syria: including Lebanon and Palestine (1951)
- Syria: A Short History (1959), the condensed version of the 1951 History of Syria: including Lebanon and Palestine
- The Near East in History (1961)
- Islam and the West (1962)
- Lebanon in History (1957)
- Makers of Arab History (1968)
- Islam: A Way of Life (1970)
- Capital cities of Arab Islam (1973)

== See also ==
- Islamic scholars
- Jawad Ali
