= Templers (Radical Pietist sect) =

Radical Pietistic sect of Christianity

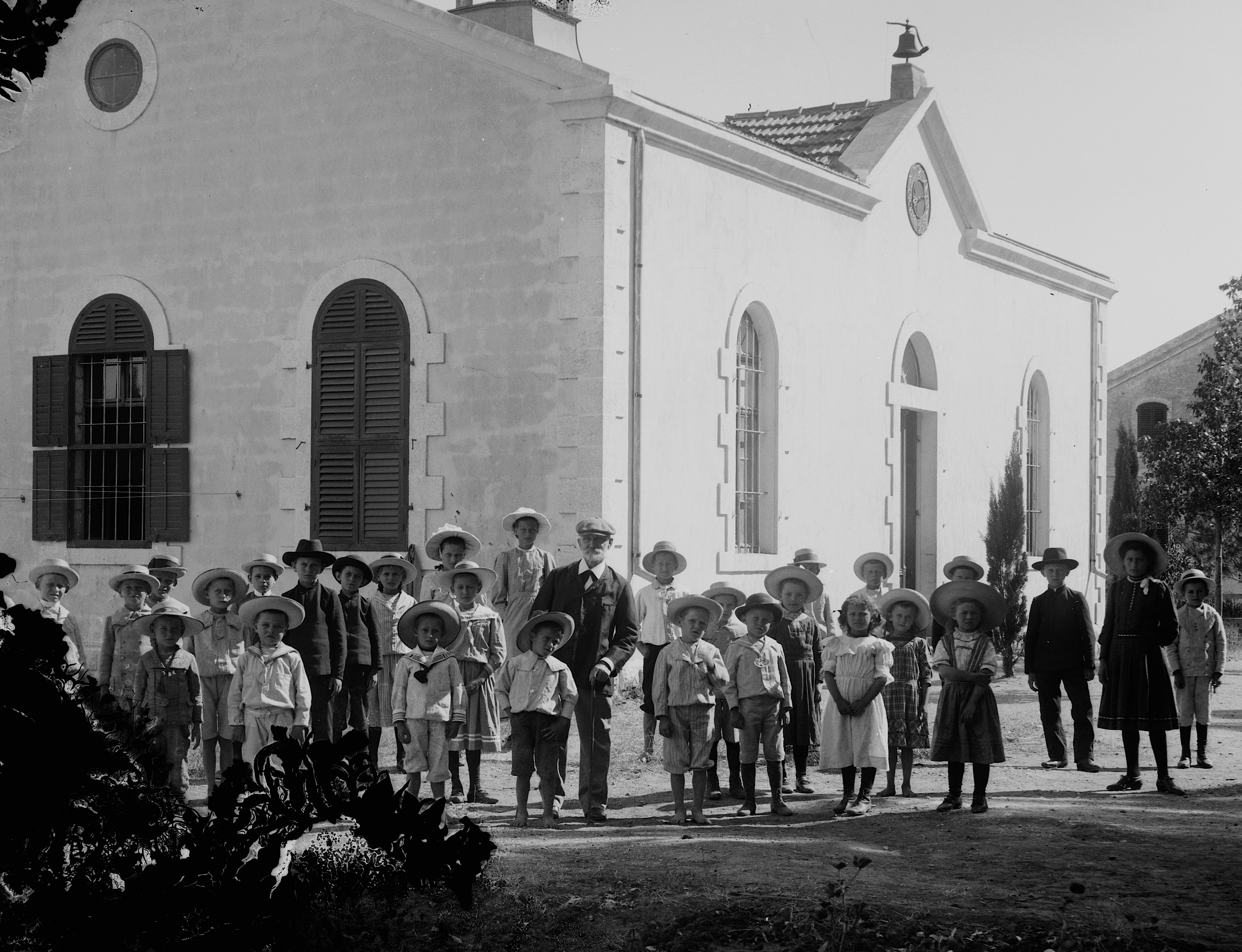
Templers in Wilhelma, Palestine

The German Templer Society, also known as Templers, is a Radical Pietist group that emerged in Germany during the mid-nineteenth century, the two founders, Christoph Hoffmann and Georg David Hardegg, arriving in Haifa, Palestine, in October 1868 with their families and a few fellow Templers to establish the German Templer colonies in Palestine.

Templer theology is rooted in the legacy of preceding centuries during which various Christian groups undertook to establish the perfect Christian religion in preparation for the Second Coming of Jesus. The movement was founded by Hoffmann (1815–1885), who believed that humanity's salvation lay in the gathering of God's people in a Christian community. He also thought that the second coming of Jesus was imminent and that, according to biblical prophecy, it would take place in Jerusalem, where God's people were to gather as a symbol of the rebuilding of the Temple.

Hoffmann's thinking was inspired by the adherents of early Christianity and was based on Matthew's gospel regarding Old Testament (Hebrew Bible) prophecies and their relevance to the coming of Yeshua aka Jesus. Hoffmann also believed that these "prophecies concerned mainly the founding of the Kingdom of God on Earth."

In deciding where a Christian community should be established, Hoffmann wrote, "I made a special study, to discover if a center were named in the prophesies. I found that some Prophets declared Jerusalem to be the center. Others mentioned Israel, that is, Palestine, to be the external manifestation of the Kingdom of God on this earth. The prophesies stress the importance of uniting and gathering God's people. This is the responsibility of those who wish to work for the salvation of mankind. There is no doubt—and I believe it with all my heart—this Kingdom of God has a complementary, temporal meaning as well as a spiritual one. For instance, in a Christian state, a Kingdom of God, the misery and famine among poor people after a crop failure is uncalled for! The Kingdom of God is a happy state. This is emphasised in all the Biblical prophesies, and should exist for all people. The Prophets point to Jerusalem as the Center of the Kingdom of God, a Happy State!"

== Etymology ==
The word Templer is derived from the concept of the community described in the Christian New Testament's 1 Corinthians 3:16 and 1 Peter 2:5, in which every person and community is seen as temple in which God's spirit dwells. There is no connection to the medieval Knights Templar.

== History ==
Christoph Hoffmann met Georg David Hardegg (1812–1879) in 1849. They became friends and partners, and in 1853, Hardegg embraced Hoffmann's dream of a Christian state. Initially, the Templer Movement/Temple Society was called the "Friends of Jerusalem." In 1855, Hoffmann announced in the Sentinel that the group aimed to establish a way of life based on God's word. He also stated that the global conversion to unite God's people would occur only after Jesus's second coming.

In 1856, Hoffmann and Hardegg moved with their families and other "Friends of Jerusalem" to the Kirschenhardthof, which had previously been part of a large estate in Hochberg, near Ludwigsburg. Here they built a thriving community, suffered a devastating typhoid fever epidemic, began planning their move to Palestine, and changed their name to the Temple Society.

While the Lutheran state church in Württemberg condemned and fought the Templers as apostates, the Prussian Protestant position was somewhat milder. Their settlement in the Holy Land found a warm support through Wilhelm Hoffmann (1806–1873), who was no apostate from the official church, like his younger brother Christoph. Through Wilhelm, Hoffmann was able to meet with Frederick William IV of Prussia in Berlin, but despite Frederick's initial suggestion that he might "send a commission to assist the Templer Society", he was reported to have told Wilhelm, "it is unthinkable that I should identify myself with these people". Despite this setback Hoffmann wrote, "we have not given up hope for the recovery of the King of Prussia", but unfortunately Frederick had become unwell, and his "illness prevented him from offering any support to the Templers."

Unperturbed by objections from the Evangelical State Church and the Catholic sector, and the resignation of some members from the Society, Hoffmann and Hardegg left for a fact-finding trip to Palestine on 9 February 1858, along with agriculturist J. Bubeck. They arrived in Jaffa on 14 March 1858 and spent time visiting Jerusalem, Bethlehem, Beersheba, Nazareth, Acco, Haifa (Caifa at this time), and Tiberias before returning home.

On 6 August 1868, Hoffmann, Hardegg, their families and a group of fellow Templers left Germany for Palestine, landing in Haifa on 30 October, having made the decision not only to "stipulate the number of Templers and the timing of their migration to Palestine, but also which professions and skills were required". They had already come to the conclusion that basing themselves in Jerusalem would not be practical, planning to settle nearby, close to Nazareth, but during their journey they were advised that Haifa would be more suitable, due to its good harbour and climate.

== Early settlement in Palestine ==
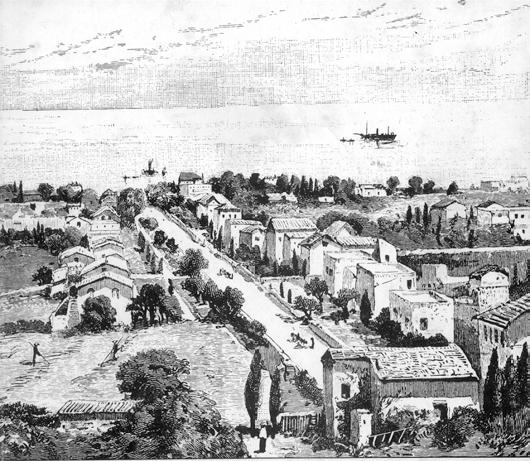
German colony in Haifa, 1875

Hoffmann and Hardegg purchased land at the foot of Mount Carmel and established a colony there in 1868. At the time, Haifa had a population of 4,000. The Templers are credited today with promoting the development of the city. The colonists built an attractive main street that was much admired by the locals. It was 30 meters wide and planted with trees on both sides. The houses, designed by architect Jacob Schumacher, were built of stone, with red-shingled roofs, instead of the flat or domed roofs common in the region. Hard work, the harsh climate and epidemics claimed the lives of many before the colony became self-sustaining. Hardegg stayed in Haifa, while Hoffmann moved on to establish other colonies.

In the same year, Bahá'u'lláh, the prophet-founder of the Baha’i Faith, arrived in the Haifa-Akka region as a prisoner of the Ottoman Empire. Years later, after his release from strict confinement, he visited the Templer Colony on Mount Carmel several times and wrote a letter to Hardegg. He asked his son, ‘Abdu’l-Baha, to build, on the alignment of the Templer Colony road (Carmel Avenue) but halfway up the mountain, the shrine to the forerunner of the religion (who was known as "the Bab"). The conjunction of the Templer buildings and the Shrine have become the most significant landmark in the modern city of Haifa.

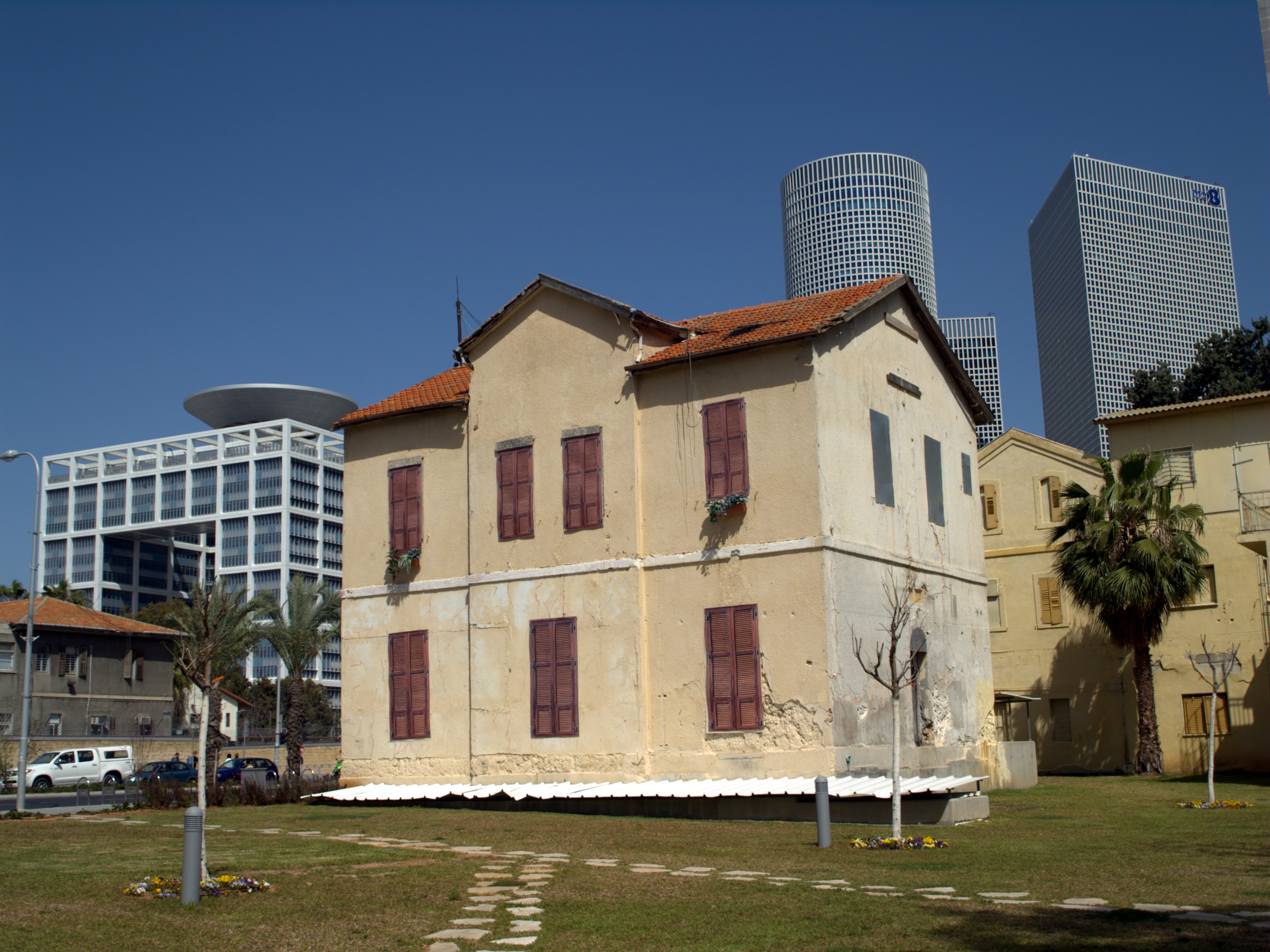
The remains of Templer buildings of Sarona in HaKirya, Tel Aviv

Hoffman established colonies in Jaffa a year later, and two years later, in 1871, a third colony in Sarona, as the Templers' first agricultural colony, on the road from Jaffa to Nablus. In 1873 a fourth colony was established in the Valley of Refaim outside Jerusalem's Old City.

The colony's oranges were the first to carry a "Jaffa orange" brand, one of the better known agricultural brands in Europe, used to market Israeli oranges to this day.

The Templers established a regular coach service between Haifa and the other cities, promoting the country's tourist industry, and made an important contribution to road construction.

== Templer colonies ==
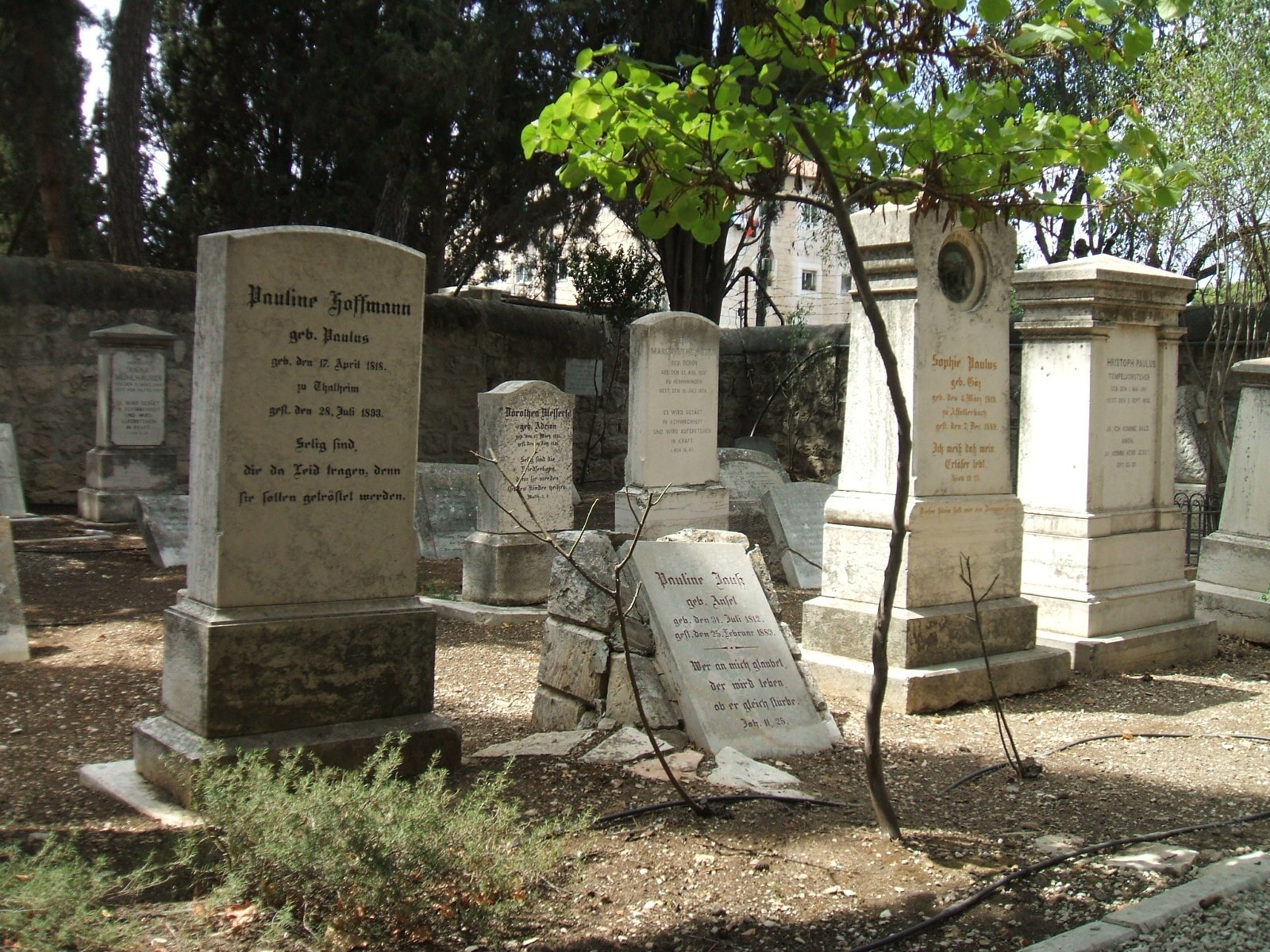
Templer Cemetery in the German Colony, Jerusalem

After the 1898 visit of Kaiser Wilhelm II of Germany, one of the Kaiser's traveling companions, Colonel Joseph Freiherr von Ellrichshausen, initiated the formation of a society for the advancement of the German settlements in Palestine, in Stuttgart. It enabled the settlers to acquire land for new settlements by offering them low interest loans.

A second wave of pioneer settlers founded Wilhelma (now Bnei Atarot) in 1902 near Lod (1903), also near the original Jaffa colony, followed by Bethlehem of Galilee (1906) and Waldheim (now Alonei Abba) in 1907. At its height, the Templer community in Palestine numbered 2,000.

In July and August 1918 the British sent 850 Templers to an internment camp at Helwan near Cairo in Egypt. In April 1920, 350 of these internees were deported to Germany. All the property of the Templers of enemy nationality (thus except of that of a few US citizens among them) was taken into public custodianship. With the establishment of a regular British administration in 1918 Edward Keith-Roach became the Public Custodian of Enemy Property in Palestine, who rented out the property and collected the rents.

In April 1920 the Allies convened at the Conference of San Remo and agreed on the British rule in Palestine, followed by the official establishment of the civil administration on 1 July 1920. From that date on Keith-Roach transferred the collected rents for property in custodianship to the actual proprietors. On 29 June 1920, the British Foreign Secretary, Lord Curzon, informed the British Upper House that Great Britain agreed in principle to their return to Palestine.

The League of Nations legitimised the British administration and custodianship by granting a mandate to Britain in 1922, which Turkey, the Ottoman successor, finally ratified by the Treaty of Lausanne, signed on 24 July 1923 and becoming effective on 6 August 1924. Thus the public custodianship ended in the same year and the prior holders achieved the fully protected legal position as proprietors.

The Mandate government and the Public Custodian of Enemy Property paid them 50% restitution for war losses of livestock and other property. The Bank of the Temple Society, formed in 1925 with its head office in Jaffa and branches in Haifa and Jerusalem, became one of the leading credit institutions in Palestine.

== Third Reich ==
After the Nazi takeover in Germany, the new Reich's government streamlined foreign policy according to Nazi ideals, using financial pressure especially. The Nazi emphasis was on creating the image that Germany and Germanness were equal to Nazism. Thus, all non-Nazi aspects of German culture and identity were discriminated against as un-German. All international schools of the German language subsidised or fully financed by government funds were obliged to redraw their educational programmes and to solely employ teachers aligned to the Nazi party. The Reich government financed the teachers in Bethlehem, so Nazi teachers also took over there.

In 1933, Templer functionaries and other non-Jewish Germans living in Palestine appealed to Paul von Hindenburg and the Foreign Office not to use swastika symbols for German institutions, without success. Some pleaded with the Reich government to drop its plan to boycott shops of Jewish Germans on 1 April 1933. Some Templers enlisted in the German Army. By 1938, 17% of the Templers in Palestine were members of the Nazi Party. According to historian Yossi Ben-Artzi, "The members of the younger generation to some extent broke away from naive religious belief, and were more receptive to the Nazi German nationalism. The older ones tried to fight it."

At the start of World War II colonists with German citizenship were rounded up by the British and sent, together with Italian and Hungarian enemy aliens, to internment camps in Waldheim and Bethlehem of Galilee. On 31 July 1941, 661 Templers and other Germans in Palestine were deported to Australia via Egypt, leaving 345 in Palestine.

In 1939, at the start of World War II, the British authorities declared the Templers enemy nationals, placed them under arrest and deported many of them to Australia. During the war the British government brokered the exchange of about 1,000 Templers for 550 Jews under German control: "'The swap', Bauer stresses, 'stemmed primarily from British and German interests: Just as the British wanted to get the Germans out, Germany was happy for the chance to rid itself of a few hundred more Jews.'"

After its foundation, the State of Israel—with the fresh memory of the Holocaust—was adamant in not permitting any ethnic Germans, of a community which had expressed pro-Nazi sympathies, to remain in or return to its territory. On 12 March 1946, a team from the Zionist Haganah assassinated the leader of the community, Gotthilf Wagner. Later, four more members of the sect were murdered in order to drive the group from Palestine. The former Templer colonies were resettled by Jews.

In 1962, the State of Israel paid DM54 million in compensation to property owners whose assets were nationalized. Sarona was incorporated in Tel Aviv, part of it becoming the compound of the Israeli Ministry of Defense and the IDF High Command Headquarters, while the other part housed various civil offices of the Israeli government, using the original German houses. In the early 21st century, the civil offices were evacuated, and the area was extensively renovated, becoming a pedestrian shopping and entertainment area.

== Timeline of the Temple Society ==
- 1861 The Temple Society was founded in South-West Germany by Christoph Hoffmann (1815–1885) and others, following a split with the Evangelical-Lutheran Church in Württemberg (7/10/1859) over dogmatic rituals. Plans for a move to Palestine were considered.
  - The centre of the new movement was from 1856 in Kirschenhardthof, where a community hall and a school were commissioned in July that year. The community consisted of nine properties of approximately 5ha each. It could at most accommodate 132 residents.
  - Attempts by impatient members to settle on their own in Palestine in 1867, at Samunieh, had tragic consequences: of the 25 persons in the group 15 died within a year, 7 in Medjedel and 8 in Samunieh.
- 1868 Beginning of carefully planned migration of Templers to the Holy Land, then part of the Ottoman Empire. In 1869 begins the construction of the first house in Haifa, the community hall (Gemeindehaus). Over many years urban and rural settlements with community halls and schools, commercial, trade, farm and transport enterprises were established in a number of locations including Haifa, Jaffa and Jerusalem.
- The beliefs and ideas of the Templers also spread to the German Mennonites from the Russian settlement of Molotschna where Johann Lange, former student from Württemberg, formed the Tempelhof congregation in Gnadenfeld after years of bitter controversy.
- 1874 schism of the Temple Society, with a third of the members seceding and founding the Temple Association (Tempelverein) in 1878, later joining the Evangelical State Church of Prussia's older Provinces
- 1875 Publication of 'Occident und Orient, Part 1' by Christoph Hoffmann. English translation 1995 'The Temple Society and its Settlements in the Holy Land' ISBN 0-9597489-4-6, Occident and Orient, Part 1.
- 1921 Templers who had been interned in Helouan, Egypt, towards the end of World War I returned to their settlements in Palestine, now a British Mandate. The settlements soon flourished again.
- 1939 German Templers were interned in Palestine at the outbreak of World War II.
- 1941 Over 500 Templers from Palestine were transported to Australia, where internment continued in Tatura, Victoria, until 1946-7. In December, 65 persons take part in an exchange program from Palestine to Germany.
- 1942 In November, 302 persons take part in an exchange program from Palestine to Germany.
- 1944 In July, 112 persons take part in an exchange program from Palestine to Germany.
- 1948 Formation of the State of Israel. Templers cannot return there, those left had to leave. As of 2010 most live in Australia and Germany.

=== Temple Society Australia ===
- 1948-50 Australian Templers consolidate around Melbourne, Sydney and Adelaide. Over the years church halls and community centres were established at Boronia, Bayswater and Bentleigh in Melbourne, Meadowbank in Sydney and at Tanunda near Adelaide.
- 1950 Formation of the Temple Society Australia with Dr. Richard Hoffmann as Regional Head
- 1970 Australian and German Templer Regions linked formally by appointment of Dr. R. O. Hoffmann as President of the Temple Society
- 1972 Templer Home for the Aged opened in Bayswater
- 1979 Tabulam Nursing Home, located next to the Templer Home for the Aged, begun as a joint undertaking with the Australian-German Welfare Society.
- 1981 New Youth Group club room and school rooms completed at Bayswater.
- 1986 Templers in Germany and Australia celebrate 125 years of Temple Society.
- 1987 Sydney Templers secure places in the St. Hedwig Homes for the Aged of the Catholic German Community of St. Raphael in Blacktown NSW, opened in 1989.
- 1988 Dr Richard Hoffmann retires. Dietrich Ruff is elected as the new President of the Temple Society
- 1990s New initiatives: Templer residential unit development in Bayswater, Kids' Club, Australian-German Templer Exchange, Country Victorian Templer Groups
- 2001/2 Dietrich Ruff retires. Peter Lange is elected as the new President of the Temple Society
- 2002 A new Temple Chapel is built in the Bayswater Community Centre. Extensive Remodel of the TTHA.
- 2005 TSA Constitution changed to reflect the lifestyle of its members in Australia. It is no longer a community-based organisation, but one consisting of many focus and interest groups.

=== Tempelgesellschaft in Germany ===
- 1949 After a pause of 10 years, publication of Die Warte des Tempels is resumed in September. Rundschreiben keeps members informed.
- 1950 Management office installed at Mozartstraße 58, Stuttgart, where meetings and religious services were held. Treffpunkt Mozartstraße became hub of social activities.
- 1954, at a General Meeting in September a revision of the 20-year-old constitution is proposed.
- 1962, on 27 January the new constitution was finalised and accepted and the Tempelgesellschaft in Deutschland e.V. (TGD) instituted. A move to larger premises initiated.
- 1967 New community centre officially opened in Felix-Dahn-Straße, Degerloch
- 1970 the Australian and German Templer Regions formally linked by the appointment of Dr. R. O. Hoffmann as President of the society.
- 1976 TGD joins Bund für Freies Christentum.

== Templer and related Protestant settlements in Palestine ==
In chronological order of their establishment:

- 1869-70: German Colony, Haifa, became a settlement of mixed denominational affiliation
- 1869-70: German Colony, Jaffa
- 1872: Sarona, became a settlement of mixed denominational affiliation
- 1874: The Temple denomination underwent a schism.
- 1878: German Colony, Jerusalem, became a settlement of mixed denominational affiliation. First settlers in 1873, became a colony in 1878.
- 1886: Walhalla in Jaffa, north of the first colony.
- 1902: Wilhelma, a monodenominational settlement of only Templer colonists
- 1906: Bethlehem of Galilee, a monodenominational settlement of only Templer colonists
- 1907: Waldheim, a monodenominational settlement of only Protestant-church affiliated colonists

== See also ==
- Sarona—a former Templer colony, now a neighborhood in Tel Aviv city.
