= Shrine of the Báb =

Tomb of the founder of the Bábí Faith in Haifa, Israel

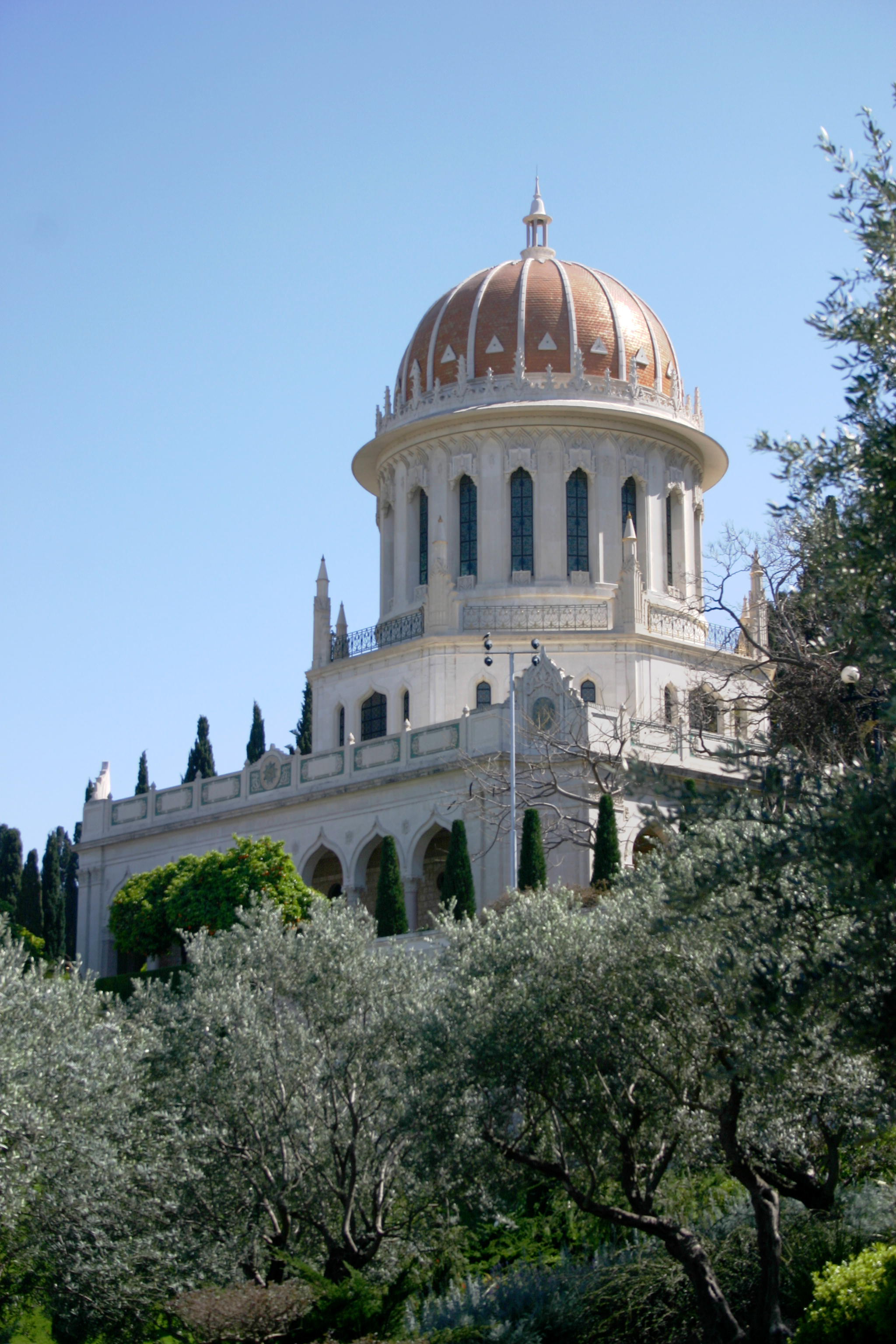
- Interactive map of Shrine of the Báb
- Location: Haifa, Israel
- Coordinates: 32°48′52″N 34°59′14″E
- Designer: William Sutherland Maxwell
- Type: Shrine
- Material: Stone
- Height: 11 m (36 ft)
- Beginning date: 1909; 117 years ago
- Completion date: 1953; 73 years ago
- Restored date: 2008–2011
- Dedicated to: Báb

The Shrine of the Báb is a structure on the slopes of Mount Carmel in Haifa, Israel, where the remains of the Báb, founder of the Bábí Faith and forerunner of Baháʼu'lláh in the Baháʼí Faith, are buried; it is considered to be the second holiest place on Earth for Baháʼís, after the Shrine of Baháʼu'lláh in Acre. Its precise location on Mount Carmel was designated by Baháʼu'lláh himself to his eldest son, ʻAbdu'l-Bahá, in 1891. ʻAbdu'l-Bahá planned the structure, which was designed and completed several years later by his grandson, Shoghi Effendi.

Crowning the design, as anticipated by ʻAbdu'l-Bahá, is a dome, which is set on an 18-windowed drum. That, in turn, is mounted on an octagon, a feature suggested by Shoghi Effendi. An arcade surrounds the stone edifice. A restoration project of the exterior and interior of the shrine started in 2008 and was completed in April 2011.

== History ==
=== First mausoleum ===
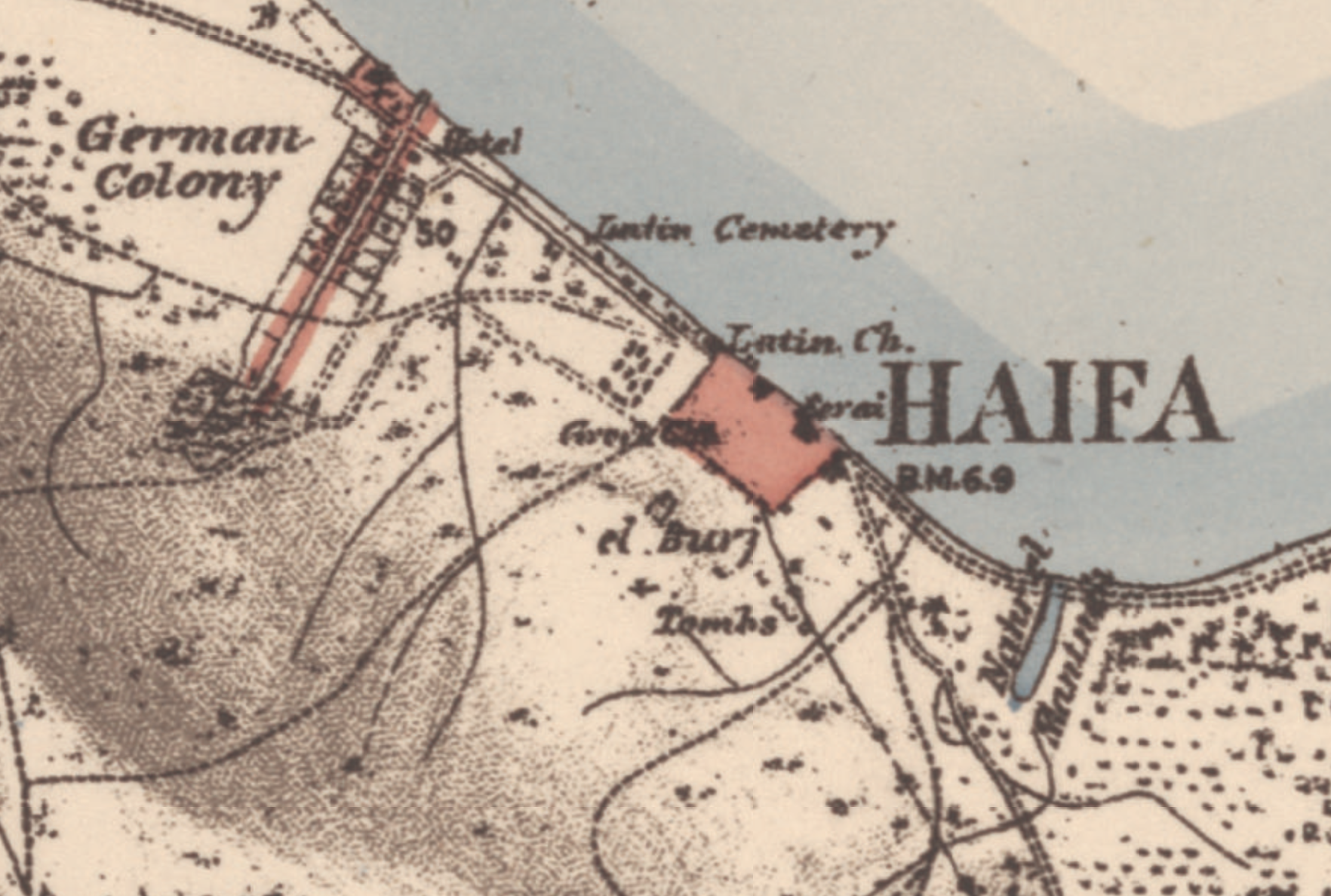
Location of the German Colony, Haifa in the 1870's PEF Survey of Palestine map; the shrine was built at the southern end of the main road shown.

Bahá'u'lláh arrived in the Haifa-Akka region as a prisoner of the Ottoman Empire in the same year as the first German Templer colony in Palestine was founded in Haifa. Years later, after his release from strict confinement, he visited the Templer Colony on Mount Carmel several times and wrote a letter to Georg David Hardegg, the co-founder of the Templer movement. He subsequently asked his son, ‘Abdu’l-Baha, to build, on the alignment of the Templer Colony road (Carmel Avenue) with the shrine to the forerunner of the religion, known as "the Báb", halfway up the mountain. The conjunction of the Templer buildings and the Shrine have become the most significant landmark in the modern city of Haifa.

The remains of the Báb were buried on March 21, 1909 in a six-room mausoleum made of local stone. In a separate room, the remains of ʻAbdu'l-Bahá were buried in November 1921. In 1929 three rooms were added to the mausoleum.

=== Final shrine ===
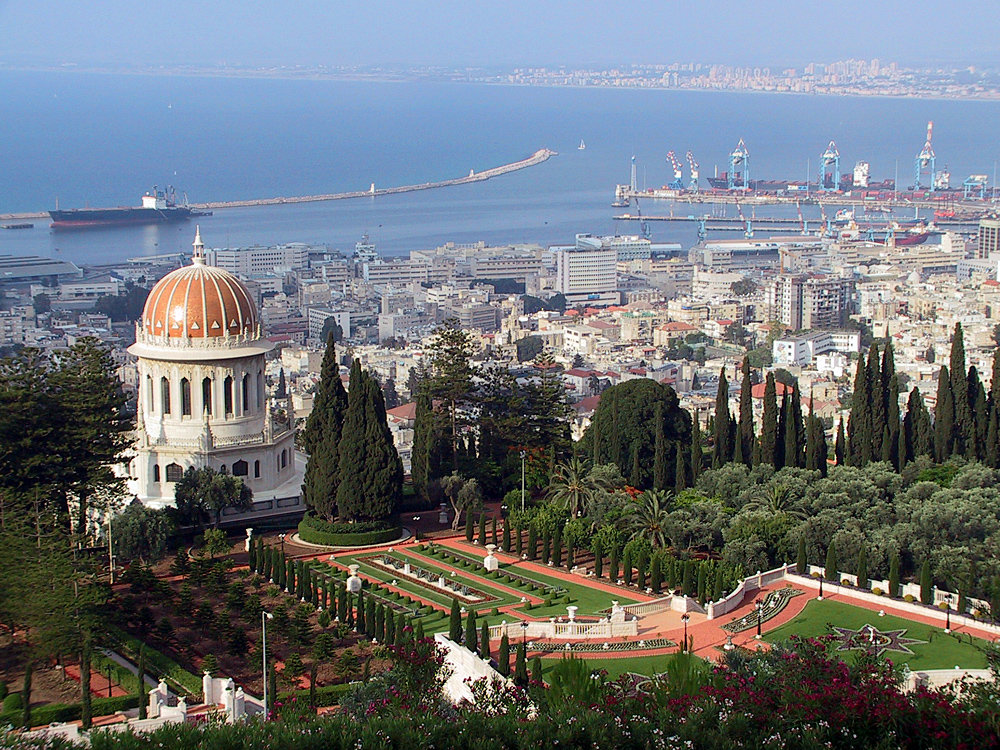
Shrine of the Báb and the Port of Haifa

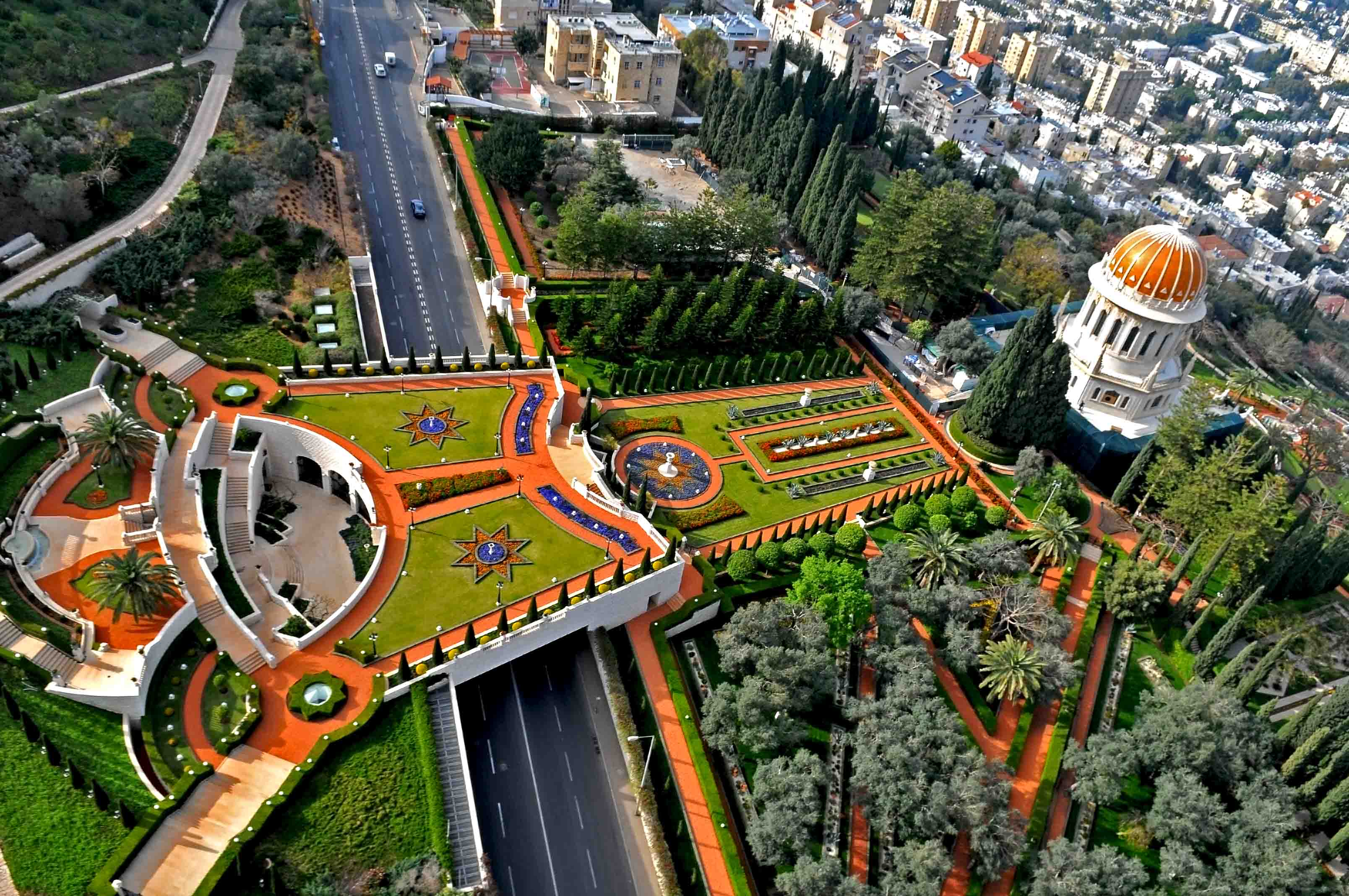
Shrine of the Báb and the Baháʼí gardens in Haifa, Israel over Hatzionut Avenue

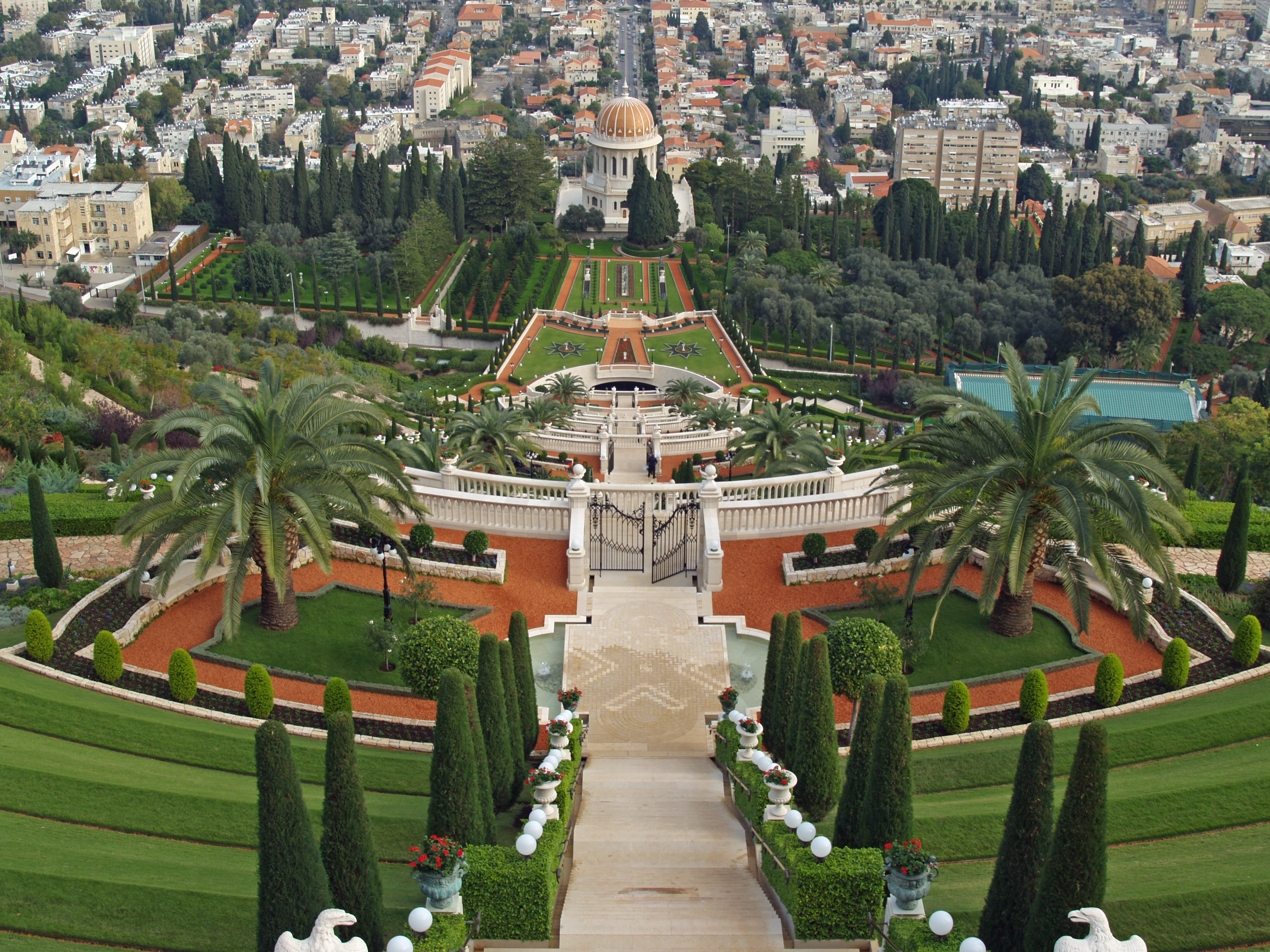
Baháʼí gardens

In 1949 the first threshold stone of the superstructure was laid by Shoghi Effendi. The construction was completed over the mausoleum in 1953 and was entirely paid for by Baháʼís around the world.

The architect was William Sutherland Maxwell, a Canadian Baháʼí who was a Beaux-Arts architect and the father-in-law of Shoghi Effendi. Shoghi Effendi provided overall guidance, including in the use of Western and Eastern styles, but left the artistic details to Maxwell. Maxwell's design of the Baveno rose granite colonnade, Oriental-style Chiampo stone arches, and golden dome is meant to harmonize Eastern and Western proportions and style. Maxwell died in 1952, and Shoghi Effendi named the southern door of the Shrine after him. Some remaining aspects of the dome's structural engineering were designed by Professor H. Neumann of Haifa's Technion University.

In 1952, Leroy Ioas, an American Baháʼí who had been closely associated with the construction of the Baháʼí House of Worship in Wilmette, Illinois helped Shoghi Effendi in the construction process. Ioas employed his administrative skills and practical mind to supervise the building of the drum and dome, a task done without the availability of sophisticated machinery. Shoghi Effendi named the door on the octagon after him.

Because of the scarcity of building materials in the area after World War II, most of the stones for the Shrine of the Báb were carved in Italy with the assistance of Ugo Giachery and then shipped to Haifa. One of the doors of the Shrine was named after Giachery. The superstructure was said to be at the time the largest prefabricated building to move from Europe to any point in the world.

== Design and composition ==
=== Dome ===
The dome is composed of 12,000 fish-scale tiles. It is alleged that a Dutch company created a "special technology" (baking the clay tiles three times) and a combination of different glazes and a solution containing gold.

After more than fifty years of exposure, many of the tiles were badly damaged or broken. Newer tiles from 2011 were made with less consistency; included are more than a hundred different shapes and sizes. These tiles were made in Portugal involving porcelain being repeatedly fire-glazed and covered in gold solution.

=== Octagon and drum ===
The main body of the building, centered around the tomb of the Báb, is octagonal.

The cylindrical drum set between the octagon and the dome rises 11 meters and rests on a circular steel-reinforced-concrete ring on the top of the octagon.

=== Decorations ===
The Shrine is decorated with emerald green and scarlet mosaics on the balustrade above, a fire-gilded bronze symbol of the Greatest Name of the Baháʼí Faith at the four corners, and a multitude of intricate decorations and motifs.

== Interior ==
The Shrine is a place for quiet prayer and meditation where no ceremonies or religious services are held. A special prayer used by Baháʼís when visiting the Shrine, known as the Tablet of Visitation, is hung on the wall in both the original Arabic and an English translation.

== Titles ==
Shoghi Effendi, in a message dated 19 August 1953, has described the Shrine in the following poetic way: "...Queen of Carmel enthroned on God's Mountain, crowned in glowing gold, robed in shimmering white, girdled in emerald green, enchanting every eye from air, sea, plain and hill." He has also called the Shrine the Kúh-i-Núr (Mountain of Light), facing and overshadowed by the Daryá-yi-Núr (Ocean of Light, the Shrine of Baháʼu'lláh).

== UNESCO World Heritage Site ==
On July 8, 2008, the Shrine of the Báb, along with several other Baháʼí holy sites in Haifa and the nearby city of Acre (Akko), were inscribed on the UNESCO World Heritage List. The Baháʼí shrines "are the first sites connected with a relatively new religious tradition to be recognized by the World Heritage List." The UNESCO World Heritage Committee considers the sites to be "of outstanding universal value [and]...inscribed for the testimony they provide to the Baháʼí's strong tradition of pilgrimage and for their profound meaning for the faith."

"We welcome the UNESCO recognition, which highlights the importance of the holy places of a religion that in 150 years has gone from a small group found only in the Middle East to a worldwide community with followers in virtually every country," said Albert Lincoln, secretary-general of the Baha'i International Community.

== Terraced gardens ==
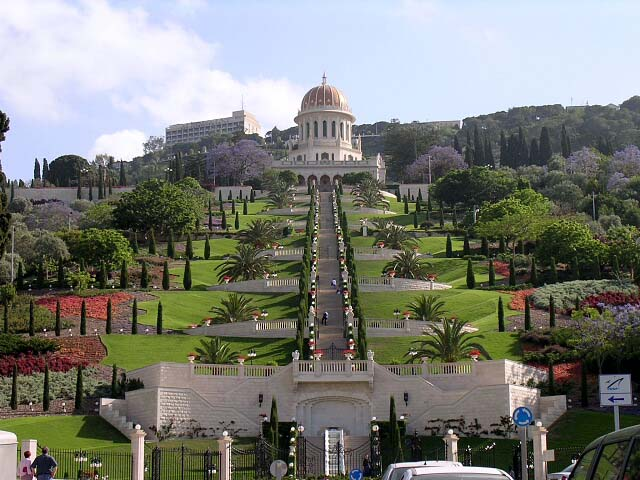
The terraces below the Shrine of the Báb

Surrounded by terraced gardens, the Shrine is one of the most recognizable landmarks in Haifa and has attracted millions of visitors. The Shrine is enhanced by 19 garden terraces that stretch one kilometre from the base of Mount Carmel to its summit, and both the terraces and the Shrine are illuminated at night. The Baháʼís consider the Shrine of the Báb and the surrounding gardens to be a "gift to humanity."

== See also ==
- Religious significance of the Syrian region
- Shrine of ʻAbdu'l-Bahá
