= Bethlehem of Galilee =

Cooperative community in northern Israel

Bethlehem of Galilee: בֵּית לֶחֶם הַגְּלִילִית (Hebrew)
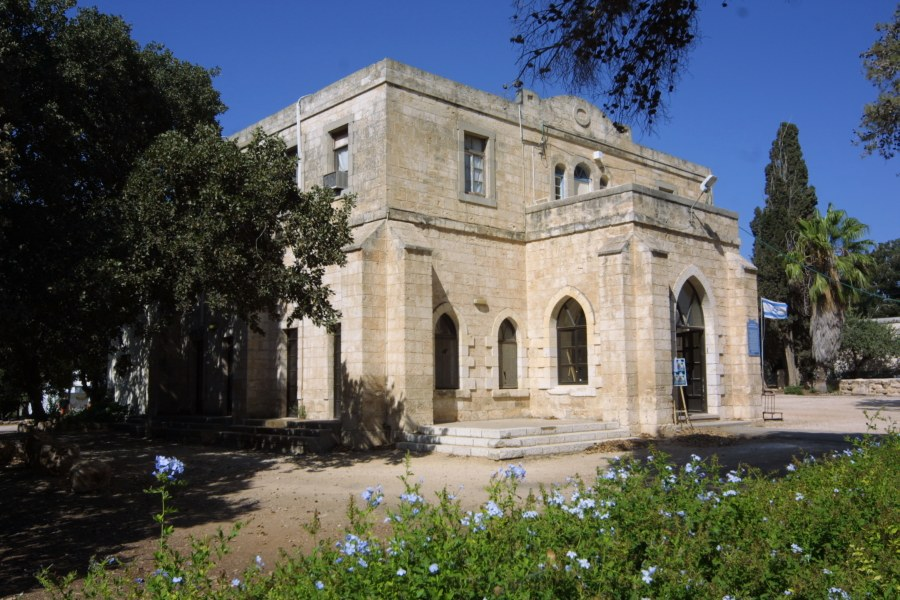

- Location within Jezreel Valley region of Israel Location within Israel
- Coordinates: 32°44′12″N 35°11′29″E
- Grid position: 167/237 PAL
- Country: Israel
- District: Northern
- Subdistrict: Jezreel
- Council: Jezreel Valley
- Affiliation: Moshavim Movement
- Founded: 2000 BCE (Ancient town); 1596 (Bayt Lahm); 1906 (Templer colony); 1948 (Moshav)
- Population (2024): 824

Bethlehem of Galilee (Hebrew: בֵּית לֶחֶם הַגְּלִילִית, Beit Lehem HaGlilit; lit. "the Galilean Bethlehem") or Bethlehem-in-the-Galilee is a moshav in northern Israel. Located in the Galilee near Kiryat Tivon, around 10 kilometres north-west of Nazareth and 30 kilometres east of Haifa, it falls under the jurisdiction of the Jezreel Valley Regional Council. As of 2024 it had a population of 824.

The modern moshav is located at the site of the ancient Israelite settlement known as Bethlehem of Zebulun or Betlehem Zoria(h). Due to its proximity to Nazareth, one historian believes that it is the Bethlehem where Jesus of Nazareth was born. Aviram Oshri, a senior archaeologist with the Israel Antiquities Authority (IAA), supports this claim, but other researchers at the same institution reject it. The town existed as a Christian settlement in the classic era and was populated during the Middle Ages. It was reestablished as a German Templer Colony in Palestine in the 19th century and turned into a Jewish moshav in 1948.

== History ==
To distinguish the city from the city of Bethlehem near Jerusalem, it was initially known as Bethlehem of Zebulun, (Joshua 19:15) while the town near Jerusalem was called "Bethlehem of Judea" (Ruth 1:1). In the Jerusalem Talmud it is referred to as Beth Lehem Zoria, as it was part of the kingdom of Tyre (Ṣūr) at the time. According to the Book of Judges, one of the so-called "Minor Judges" of early settlement Israel, Ibzan, came from Bethlehem and was buried there. The Cambridge Bible for Schools and Colleges suggests that the Bethlehem referred to in this passage is Bethlehem of Galilee "rather than the more famous Bethlehem in the Tribe of Judah".

Until the late 19th century, and even the 1921 visit by Gustaf Dalman, the impressive remains of a church and a synagogue could be seen there. Archaeologist Ariel Berman discovered a chalk vessel industry from the Early Roman period as well as a huge wine press. This shows that it was a prosperous city, which is used as an argument in favour of identifying today's Bethlehem-in-the-Galilee with biblical Bethlehem of Zebulon.

Due to its proximity to Nazareth, one historian believes that it is the Bethlehem where Jesus was born. Aviram Oshri, a senior archaeologist with the IAA, supports this claim, although others at this institution reject it.

Remains of large Byzantine-period buildings as well as pottery (4th–5th century) from the same period have been found here, together with walls and objects from the Umayyad, Abbasid (eighth century) and Mamluk periods (14th–15th centuries).

=== Ottoman period ===
==== Arab village ====
In 1517, the village was included in the Ottoman Empire, and in the 1596 tax-records it appeared as Bayt Lahm, located in the Nahiya of Tabariyya of the Liwa of Safad. The population was 27 households and two bachelors, all Muslim. They paid a tax rate of 25% on agricultural products, which included wheat, barley, cotton, vegetable and fruit gardens, occasional revenues, goats and beehives; a total of 1200 Akçe.

In 1859, the British consul Rogers stated that the population was 110, and the tillage at sixteen feddans.

In 1875 Victor Guérin visited and noted that Bethlehem was a small village, which had succeeded a town of the same name. He further noted the ruins of two buildings; one, completely destroyed, had been constructed of good cut stones; the entrance was at the south façade. He thought, from its orientation north and south, that it was a synagogue. The other building, which lay east and west, may have been a Christian church. On its site were seen a few shafts, four of which were still in situ and half covered up.

In 1882, the Palestine Exploration Fund's Survey of Western Palestine described it as "The ancient Bethlehem of Zebulon. A village principally built of adobe on high ground in the border of the wooded country. The nearest water is in Wady el Melek, on the north (Ras el 'Ain), and at the springs near Muwarah on the south."

A population list from about 1887 showed that Kh. Beit Lahm had about 55 inhabitants, all Muslims.

==== Templer village ====
In 1906 Templers from the German Colony in Haifa established a colony in Galilee, naming it for the ancient city of Bethlehem.

=== British Mandate period ===
In the 1922 census of Palestine conducted by the British authorities, Bait Lam had a population of 224; 111 Christians and 113 Muslims. Of the Christians, 95 were Protestant and 16 were Greek Catholics (Melkites). This had increased slightly by the 1931 census to a population of 235; 135 Muslim, 99 Christians and 1 Jew, in a total of 51 inhabited houses.

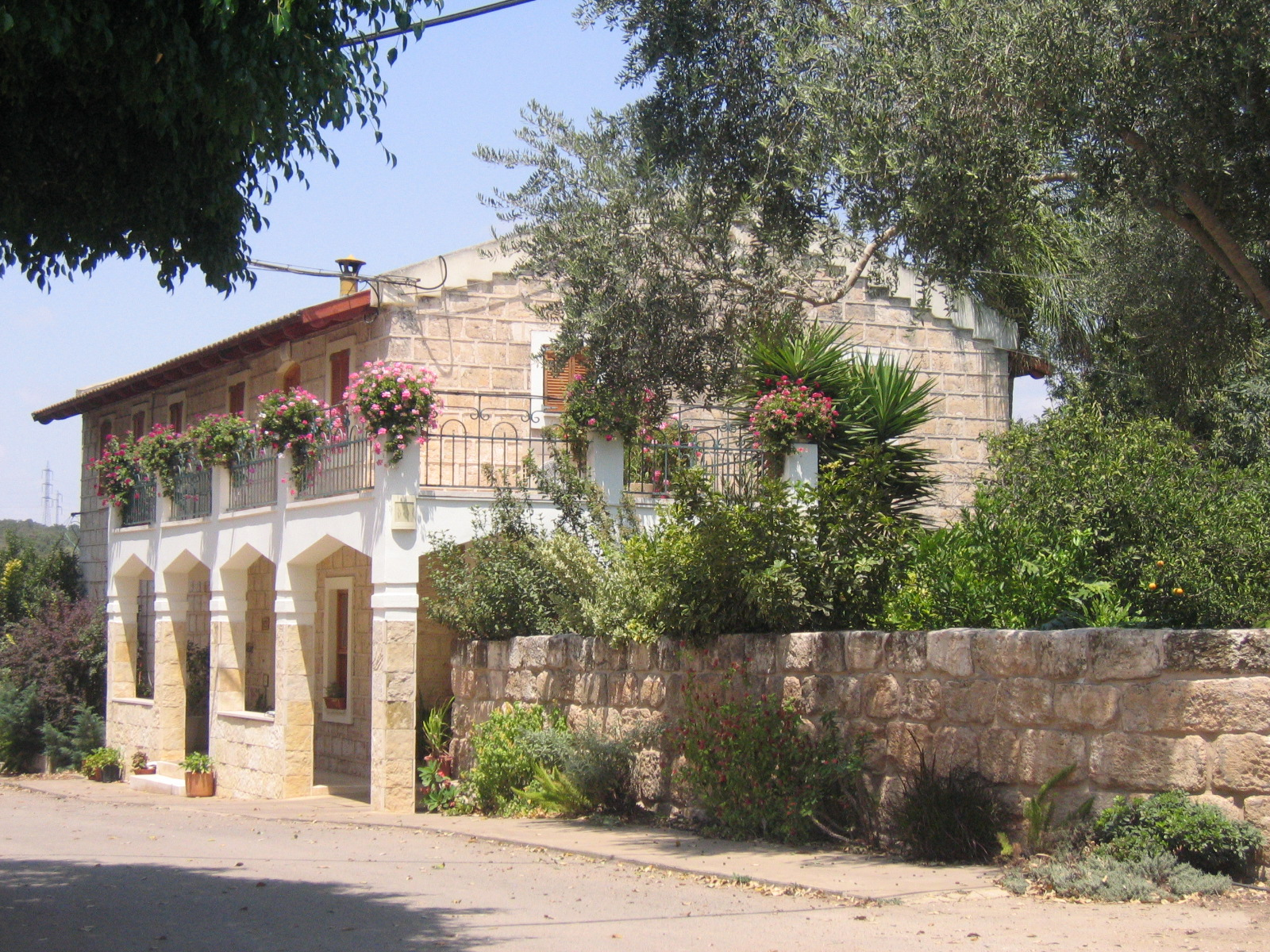
Restored historic home in Bethlehem of Galilee

In 1932 the Nazi Party gained its first two members in Palestine; Karl Ruff and Walter Aberle from the Templer colony in Haifa. In the course of the 1930s, Bethlehemites also joined the party, indicating the fading affinity to the Templers' original ideals. By August 1939, 17% of all German Christians in Palestine were members of the Nazi Party. After the Nazi takeover in Germany, all international schools of German language subsidized or fully financed by government funds were obliged to employ teachers aligned to the Nazi Party. In 1933, Templer functionaries appealed to Paul von Hindenburg and the Foreign Office not to use swastika symbols for German institutions in Palestine and voiced opposition to the boycott of German Jewish shops. Later, this opposition subsided. On 20 August 1939 the German government called on German Christians in Palestine to join the Wehrmacht and 350 men enlisted.

After the start of World War II, all Germans in Palestine were declared enemy aliens. The British authorities sent them to Sarona, Bethlehem (Galilee), Waldheim (today's Allonei Abba) and Wilhelma. In summer 1941, 665 German internees, mostly young families with children, were deported to Australia, leaving those who were too old or sick. In December 1941 and in the course of 1942 another 400 German internees, mostly wives and children of men who had enlisted in the Wehrmacht, were released - via Turkey - to Germany for the purpose of family reunification.

In the 1945 statistics the population of Beit Lam consisted of 370 people; 210 Muslims and 160 Christians, and the total land area was 7,526 dunams according to an official land and population survey. 6 dunams of land were designated for citrus and bananas, 278 dunams for plantations and irrigable land, 4,796 for cereals, while 51 dunams were built-up areas.

In 1945 the Italian and Hungarian internees were released but the Britons refused to repatriate the remaining German internees to the British zone in Germany. In 1947, they were allowed to emigrate to Australia.

=== Israel ===
On 17 April 1948 the Haganah captured the village, and it was subsequently depopulated. By 14 May 1948, when Israel declared independence, only 50 Templers remained in the country. It was resettled by Jewish farmers, becoming a moshav. Much of the original Templer architecture survives, and is similar in style to the homes built by the Templers in other parts of the country, such as Sarona in Tel Aviv, Wilhelma (today Bnei Atarot) and the German colonies of Haifa and Jerusalem.

In recent years, tourism has replaced agriculture as the main economic branch. A dairy, an herb farm, restaurants and country-style accommodation are among the tourist-oriented businesses in the village today.

== Bibliography ==
- Balke, Ralf (2001). Hakenkreuz im Heiligen Land: Die NSDAP-Landesgruppe Palästina. Erfurt: Sutton. ISBN 3-89702-304-0.
- Barron, J.B., ed. (1923). Palestine: Report and General Abstracts of the Census of 1922. Government of Palestine.
- Conder, C.R.; Kitchener, H.H. (1881). The Survey of Western Palestine: Memoirs of the Topography, Orography, Hydrography, and Archaeology. Vol. 1. London: Committee of the Palestine Exploration Fund.
- Dalali-Amos, Edna (2011-07-04). "Bet Lehem Ha-Gelilit Final Report". Hadashot Arkheologiyot – Excavations and Surveys in Israel (123).
- Dauphin, C. (1998). La Palestine byzantine, Peuplement et Populations. BAR International Series 726 (in French). Vol. III : Catalogue. Oxford: Archeopress. ISBN 0-860549-05-4.
- Department of Statistics (1945). Village Statistics, April, 1945. Government of Palestine.
- Guérin, V. (1880). Description Géographique Historique et Archéologique de la Palestine (in French). Vol. 3: Galilee, pt. 1. Paris: L'Imprimerie Nationale.
- Hadawi, S. (1970). Village Statistics of 1945: A Classification of Land and Area ownership in Palestine. Palestine Liberation Organization Research Center.
- Hütteroth, W.-D.; Abdulfattah, K. (1977). Historical Geography of Palestine, Transjordan and Southern Syria in the Late 16th Century. Erlanger Geographische Arbeiten, Sonderband 5. Erlangen, Germany: Vorstand der Fränkischen Geographischen Gesellschaft. ISBN 3-920405-41-2.
- Mills, E., ed. (1932). Census of Palestine 1931. Population of Villages, Towns and Administrative Areas. Jerusalem: Government of Palestine.
- Negev, Avraham/Gibson, S. (2001), Archaeological Encyclopedia of the Holy Land, Continuum, New York/London, p. 80
- Palmer, E.H. (1881). The Survey of Western Palestine: Arabic and English Name Lists Collected During the Survey by Lieutenants Conder and Kitchener, R. E. Transliterated and Explained by E.H. Palmer. Committee of the Palestine Exploration Fund.
- Rhode, H. (1979). Administration and Population of the Sancak of Safed in the Sixteenth Century. Columbia University. Archived from the original on 2020-03-01.
- Sauer, Paul: Vom Land um den Asperg im Namen Gottes nach Palästina und Australien: Die wechselvolle Geschichte der Tempelgesellschaft, lecture held on 20 October 1995 in Burgstetten on the occasion of the 750th anniversary of Kirschenhardthof, printed as Schriftenreihe TG, No. 1 (1996)
- Schumacher, G. (1888). "Population list of the Liwa of Akka". Quarterly Statement - Palestine Exploration Fund. 20: 169–191.
- Tepper, Y. (2016-04-14). "Bet-Lehem Ha-Gelilit". Hadashot Arkheologiyot – Excavations and Surveys in Israel (128).
