= Alonei Abba =

Alonei Abba: אַלּוֹנֵי אַבָּא (Hebrew)

Hebrew transcription(s)
  - Official: Allone Abba
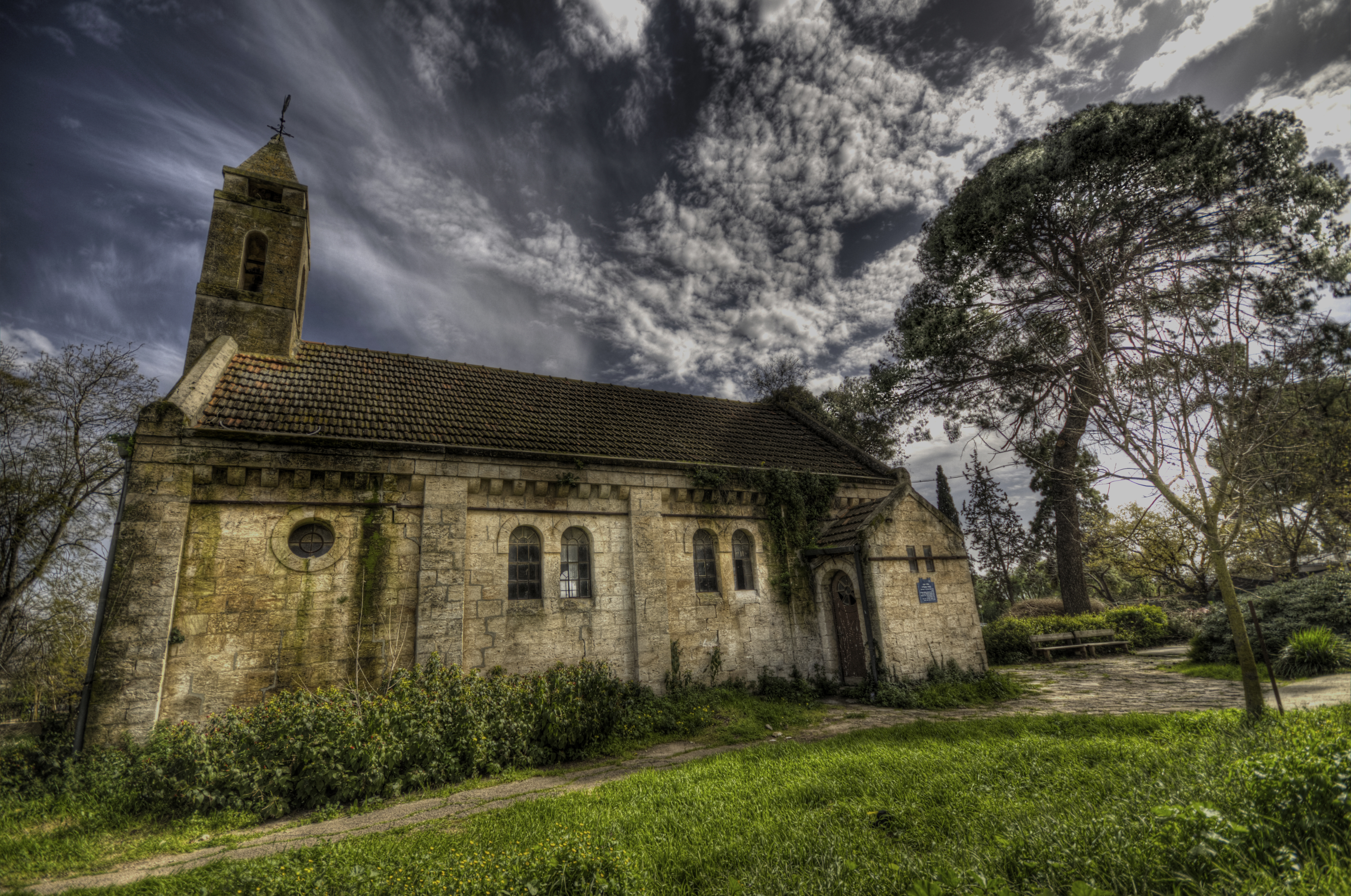

- Location within Jezreel Valley region of Israel
- Coordinates: 32°43′46″N 35°10′18″E
- Grid position: 166/237 PAL
- Country: Israel
- District: Northern
- Subdistrict: Jezreel
- Council: Jezreel Valley
- Region: Lower Galilee
- Affiliation: HaOved HaTzioni
- Founded: 1948
- Founder: Austrian and Romanian Jewish immigrants
- Population (2024): 911
- Website: aloneyaba.org.il

Alonei Abba (Hebrew: אַלּוֹנֵי אַבָּא, lit. 'Abba's Oaks') is a moshav shitufi in northern Israel. Located in the Lower Galilee near Bethlehem of Galilee and Alonim, in the hills east of Kiryat Tivon, it falls under the jurisdiction of the Jezreel Valley Regional Council. In 2024 it had a population of 911.

The modern village was founded in 1948 on the site of the historical Arab village of Umm el Amad, later the German Protestant Colony of Waldheim.

== History ==
Archaeological investigations indicate that this was an industrial agricultural processing area in the Hellenistic and Roman periods. Among the remains found are Roman-period industrial oil press and a winepress, in addition to a paved path from the same era.

=== Ottoman era ===
==== Umm al-Amed ====
Umm al-'Amad was mentioned in the Ottoman defter for the year 1555–6, as Mezraa land, (that is, cultivated land), located in the Nahiya of Tabariyya of the Liwa of Safad. The land was designated as Ziamet land. In 1799 it appeared as a village Zebed on the Carte de l'Égypte (Description de l'Égypte) of Pierre Jacotin, and in the 1880s as Umm el Amed (Arabic: ام العمد) on the PEF Survey of Palestine. The 1799 Jacotin map had not surveyed the area; it was drawn based on the notes of an inhabitant of Shefa-ʻAmr and some parts are incorrect.

In 1859 the British consul Rogers stated that the population of Umm al-Amed was 100 and the tillage was ten feddans. In 1875 Victor Guérin found Umm al-Amed situated on a small plateau, surrounded by gardens. In spite of its name Umm al-Amed, which meant "The place with the columns", Guérin could find no columns.

In 1881 the Palestine Exploration Fund's Survey of Western Palestine described it as standing in oak-woods on a hill-top. There was an ancient rock-cut sepulchre on the east side. A population list from about 1887 showed that Umm el Ahmad had about 55 inhabitants; all Muslims.

==== Waldheim ====
In 1907 the colony Waldheim (German: "Forest Home" or "Forestville") was founded by German Protestants affiliated with the Old-Prussian State Church on land purchased from the village of Umm al-Amed. Most of the colonists came from the German Colony (Haifa), which was founded by the Templers. In 1874, the Temple Society underwent a schism and envoys of the Evangelical State Church of Prussia's older Provinces successfully proselytised among the schismatics. Thus the Haifa German Colony became home to two Christian denominations and their congregations. While in Germany the Templers were regarded as sectarians, the Evangelical proselytes gained major financial and ideological support from Lutheran and United church bodies. This created an atmosphere of mistrust and envy among the German colonists in Haifa. Due to population increase and the ongoing urbanisation of Haifa, they searched for land to found new monodenominational colonies. Thus the Protestants founded Waldheim, while Templers settled in the neighbouring Bethlehem of Galilee.

The purchase price of 170,000 francs was financed by a Haifa-based bank Darlehenskasse der deutschen evangelischen Gemeinde Haifa GmbH and completely refinanced by the Stuttgarter Gesellschaft zur Förderung der deutschen Ansiedlungen in Palästina. The colony comprised 7,200,000 square meters (7,200 dunams).

The settlement was inaugurated on the occasion of Harvest Festival on 6 October 1907. At this time, the new Waldheimers were still living in the simple clay huts purchased from the previous owners. The Haifa engineer Ernst August Voigt presented the plan of the streets and the 16 allotments around a central plot reserved for a church. In 1909 the Jerusalemsverein (Jerusalem Association), a Berlin-based organisation supportive of Protestant activities in the Holy Land, contributed money for the development of a water supply. By 1914, the residents planted 5,000 square metres of vineyard and more than 500 olive trees. In December 1913 the farmers of Waldheim and Bethlehem keeping dairy cattle founded a common dairy cooperative to pasteurise milk and deliver it to Haifa.

=== British Mandate era ===
==== Umm el Amad and Waldheim 1918–1931 ====
In the 1922 census of Palestine conducted by the British authorities, Umm al Amad had a population of 128; 63 Christians and 65 Muslims. Of the Christians, 62 were Protestant and one was Greek Catholic (Melkite). This had increased slightly in the 1931 census, when Umm el Amad had a population of 231; 163 Muslim and 68 Christians, in a total of 76 inhabited houses.

==== Waldheim Germans 1932–1945 ====
Most of the residents bore German citizenship. In the course of the 1930s some Waldheimers joined the Nazi party, indicating the fading affinity to the Evangelical ideals. Until August 1939 17% of all gentile Germans in Palestine were enrolled as members of the Nazi party.

After the Nazi takeover in Germany, the new Reich government adapted foreign policy to Nazi ideals, based on the idea that Germany and Germanness were equal to Nazism. International schools of German language subsidised or fully financed with government funds were asked to redraw their educational programs and employ teachers aligned to the Nazi party. The teachers in Waldheim were financed by the Reich so that also here Nazi teachers took over. In 1933 German Gentiles living in Palestine appealed unsuccessfully to Paul von Hindenburg and the Foreign Office not to use Swastika symbols for German institutions. Some German Gentiles pleaded the Reich's government to drop its announced plan to boycott shops of Jewish Germans on 1 April 1933. Later the opposition of Gentile Germans in Palestine acquiesced. A Palestinian branch of the Hitler youth was built up by the help of German government subsidies. By 1935 the Nazis had succeeded to streamline the municipal bodies of the settlements of Gentile Germans in Palestine. On 20 August 1939 the German government ordered the recruitment of Gentile German men into the Wehrmacht. 350 followed the call. According to one Nahalal resident, until the outbreak of World War II the German community had good relationships with local members of the Yishuv, sold stock to them while the Jewish farmers went there to study agricultural methods, and the Germans would bring them gifts of bread on the last day of Passover.

After the start of the war, all Germans in Palestine were classed as enemy aliens. The British authorities decided to intern most of the enemy aliens. Sarona, Bethlehem of Galilee, Waldheim, and Wilhelma were converted into internment camps. Most enemy aliens living elsewhere in Palestine—comprising Gentile Germans, Hungarians and Italians—were interned in one of the settlements, while the inhabitants of the settlements simply stayed where they were. In summer 1941, 665 interned Templers from all their settlements, mainly young families with children, were transported to Australia for internment. Many of the remaining Germans were either too old or too sick to leave. The internees could maintain the agricultural production to feed themselves and supply surplus to market in return for supplies not available within the camps. In 1941, 1942 and 1944, by way of internee exchanges, another 400 Evangelical and Templer internees, mostly wives and children of men who had followed the call for recruitment, were repatriated, via Turkey, to Germany for family reunification.

==== Umm el Amad and Waldheim in 1945 ====
In the 1945 statistics, the population of Waldheim/Um el Amad consisted of 260 people, and the total land area was 9,227 dunams, according to an official land and population survey. There were 150 Muslims and 110 Christians. 170 dunams of land were designated for plantations and irrigable land, 4,776 for cereals, while 102 dunams were built-up areas.

==== Final years of Waldheim, 1945–48 ====
After the war the Palmach staged provocative operations, with hit squads killing several Germans, two involving members of the Waldheim community (Mitscherlich and Müller), against the German communities to impress upon them that they were unwelcome in Palestine. In 1946 Moshe Shertok on behalf of the Jewish Agency requested that Palestine's German colonies be liquidated, and their properties turned over to the Agency as part of reparations Germany owed the Jewish people.

According to Meir Amit who led the operation, a decision to take over the villages, which were considered friendly to the Arabs, was taken in March because Amin al-Husayni had had contact with the Nazi government during WW2. The two Templar villages, the other being Betlehem, were under British protection, and both considered 'unreliable' by Jewish forces. There was a perception that the British, who were due to evacuate Palestine in May, tended to hand over areas under their control to local Arabs, and the area was strategic because close to the main axis leading to the Nahalal police station. According to Hagai Binyamini, the German estates were very neat, and emblematic of german order and efficiency. with housing made of stone in contrast to the sheet metal, old pipes and wiring used to build local Jewish settlements.

At 04:00 on 17 April 1948 a unit composed of three platoons of Golani troopers from the Dror and Nafat Levi Battalions, drawn from members of the Nahalal, Alonim, Kfar Yehoshua Sde Ya'akov and Sha'ar HaAmakim settlements and backed by armoured trucks mounted with machine guns. penetrated into Waldheim via the woodland. Some of the soldiers were Holocaust survivors, and many were fresh from combat at Mishmar HaEmek. The Germans put up no resistance, and shots fired were attributed to Arabs. The few British soldiers under camp commander Alan Tilbury were unable to impede the attack during which two colonists, Karl and Regina Aimann, were shot dead, 'before they could even say 'good morning',' in the words of Meir Amit. Newspaper accounts the day after reported they were shot when they resisted arrest while armed, and that the action was taken to intercept plans by 'Arab gangs' to take over the property. The killings occurred in front of their eldest son Traugott. Having ordered their three children, Traugott, Helmut and Gisela to hide in a bedroom, the couple went to the door when two Jewish soldiers began knocked loudly and were cut down when they opened it. The family had reportedly taken refuge close to a British defensive position. A third woman, Katharina Deininger (65), who was milking in the cow shed at the time, suffered a severe wounding when she was shot in the head.

Medical assistance was denied to the father, who was still alive, and the community once rounded up was locked up in a building and later subjected to a long speech in which they were all denounced as Nazis. They also underwent a body search to discover, without success, whether anyone bore SS tattoos. One trooper assured the internees that "we are not like the Germans, we will not behave like the Germans". The internees were given 20 minutes to collect what remained of their belongings, all their valuables and good clothes having been looted in the meantime, together with ploughs, disks and tractors. The Germans were then stripped of any documents and some books they recovered, before being handed over to the British, who evacuated them to Haifa. The soldiers who shot the Almanns were reprimanded,- one of them, Chummi Zarchi from Nahalal, had angry memories of several Ukrainian relatives killed in the Holocaust - and the looting deplored not on moral grounds but because it endangered operative priorities.

This incident and the end of the Mandate forced the British to hasten the resettlement, thus all the internees, 51 Germans and 4 Swiss, as well as those from the other settlements, were transferred to Cyprus, into a camp of simple tents near Famagusta. By 14 May 1948, when Israel became independent, only about 50 Germans, mostly elderly and sick persons, were living in the new state. They voluntarily left the country or were later expelled by the government.

=== Alonei Abba ===
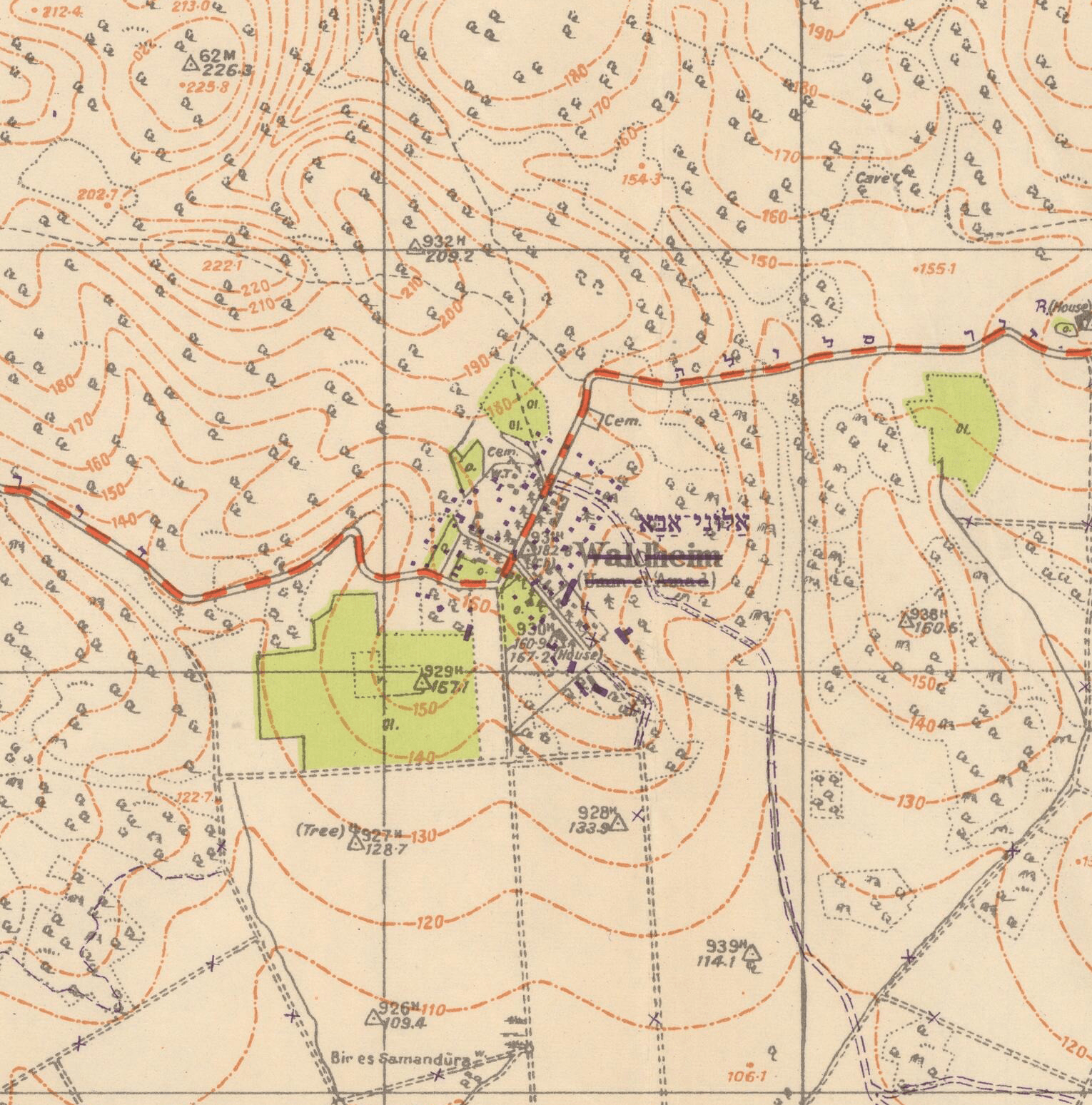
Map of Alonei Abba, 1956, on the previous sites of Umm el Amad and Waldheim

On 12 May 1948 a group of young Zionist pioneers from Czechoslovakia, Austria and Romania, members of HaNoar HaTzioni, established kibbutz BaMa'avak (In The Struggle) in the abandoned colony, after four years of agricultural training in Herzliya. Three years later, the kibbutz became a moshav shitufi and the name was changed to Alonei Abba in memory of Abba Berdichev, who was parachuted into Czechoslovakia in 1943 to assist clandestine British forces, but was captured and executed in 1945.

== Landmarks ==
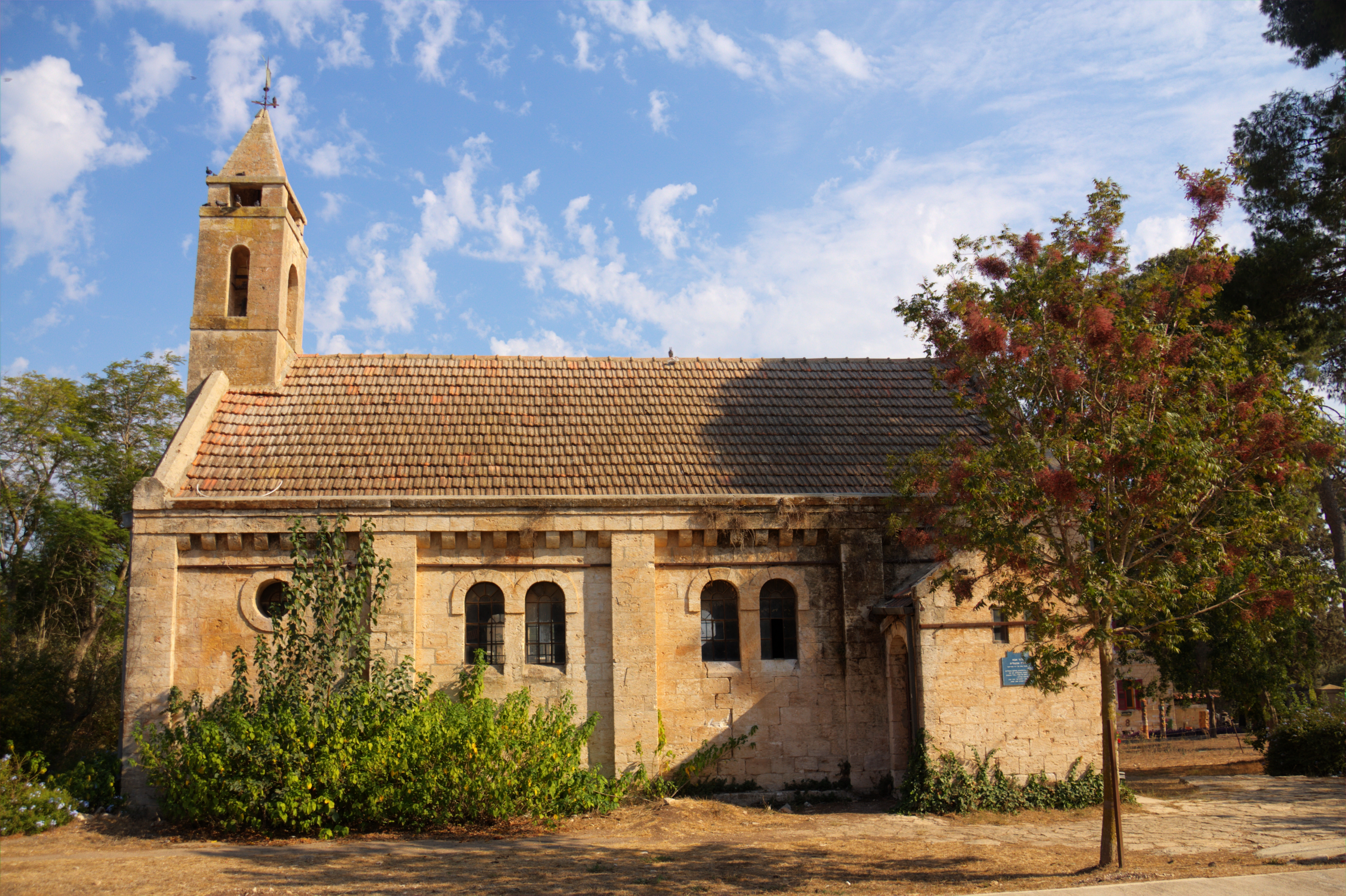
Waldheim Evangelical Church, built between 1914 and 1921 by Haifa-based architect Otto Lutz.

Hans Martin Kuno Moderow (1877-1945), pastor of the Haifa Evangelical Congregation (1908–18), also provided services in Waldheim, at the beginning in the living room of the new house of Waldheim's then mayor Gottlob Weinmann. The Waldheimers saved funds for a church of their own and could thus lay the cornerstone for the church in early 1914. The Haifa-based architect Otto Lutz led the construction works. In 1921, the Evangelical church at Alonei Abba, which still stands today, was inaugurated. The Alon winery, surrounded by a grove of oak trees, is located in the former dairy cooperative (est. 1913).

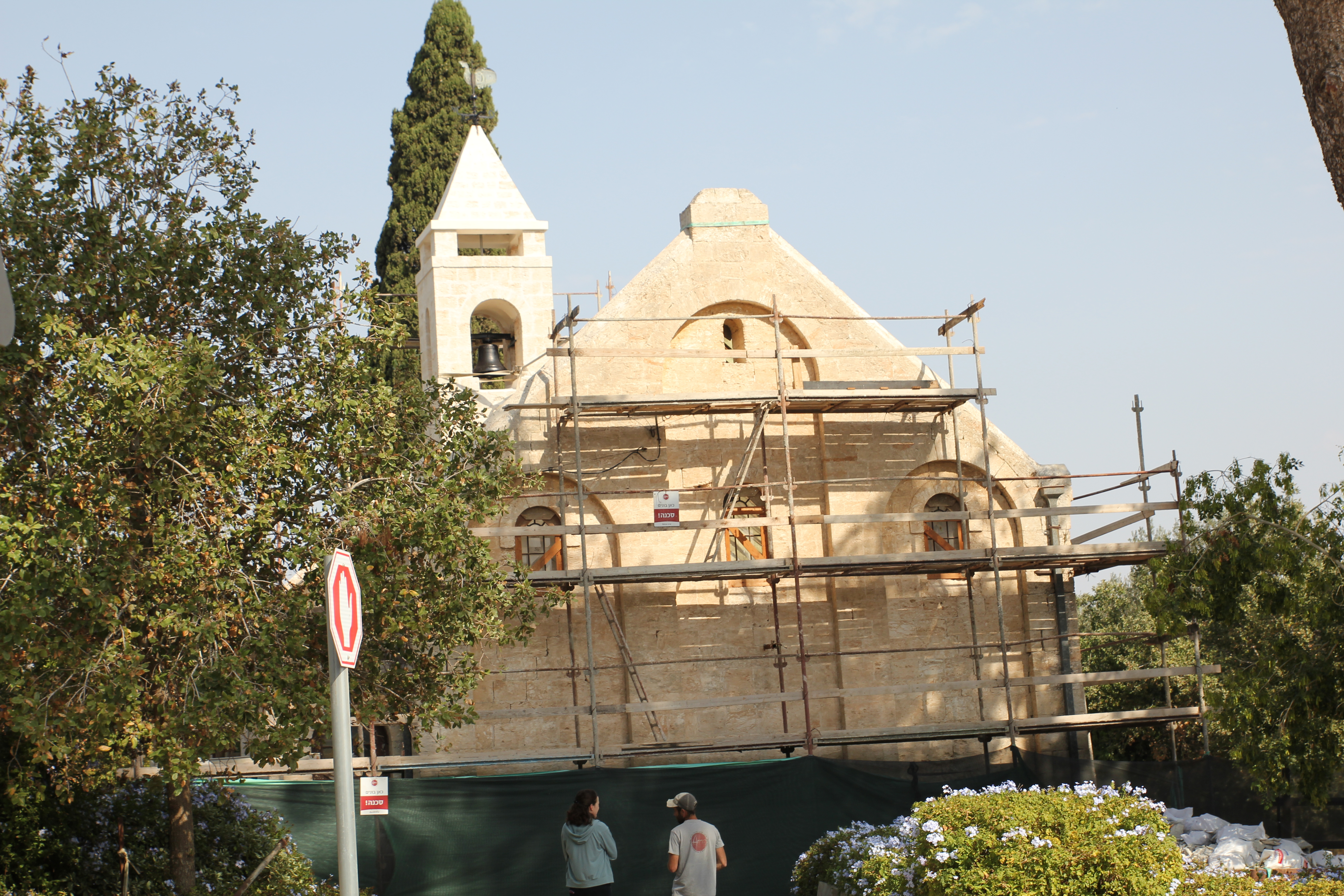
The church building in Waldheim during the process of renovation August 2017.

== Alonei Abba nature reserve ==
In 1994, a 950-dunam nature reserve was declared close by, to the north. The reserve is home to Valonia oak trees (Quercus macrolepis) and Palestine oak (Quercus calliprinos). Other flora in the forest includes terebinths (Pistacia terebinthus), storax trees (Styrax officinalis), carobs (Ceratonia siliqua), buckthorns (Rhamnus palaestinus), and Judas trees (Cercis siliquastrum). Most of the reserve is open for experimental grazing by cattle from the moshav.

== Notable residents ==
- Shlomo Artzi, musician
- Meir Shalev, writer

== Bibliography ==
- Alexandre, Yardenna (5 August 2008). "Alonēy Abba". Hadashot Arkheologiyot – Excavations and Surveys in Israel (120).
- Barron, J.B., ed. (1923). Palestine: Report and General Abstracts of the Census of 1922. Government of Palestine.
- Carmel, Alex (אלכס כרמל), Die Siedlungen der württembergischen Templer in Palästina (1868–1918) (^{1}1973), [התיישבות הגרמנים בארץ ישראל בשלהי השלטון הטורקי: בעיותיה המדיניות, המקומיות והבינלאומיות, ירושלים :חמו"ל, תש"ל; German], Stuttgart: Kohlhammer, ^{3}2000, (Veröffentlichungen der Kommission für geschichtliche Landeskunde in Baden-Württemberg: Reihe B, Forschungen; vol. 77). ISBN 3-17-016788-X.
- Conder, C.R.; Kitchener, H.H. (1881). The Survey of Western Palestine: Memoirs of the Topography, Orography, Hydrography, and Archaeology. Vol. 1. London: Committee of the Palestine Exploration Fund.
- Department of Statistics (1945). Village Statistics, April, 1945. Government of Palestine.
- Eisler, Ejal Jakob (איל יעקב איזלר), "«Kirchler» im Heiligen Land: Die evangelischen Gemeinden in den württembergischen Siedlungen Palästinas (1886–1914)" [title translated into "Church proselytes" in the Holy Land: The Protestant congregations within the Württembergian settlements of Palestine (1886–1914)], In: Dem Erlöser der Welt zur Ehre: Festschrift zum hundertjährigen Jubiläum der Einweihung der evangelischen Erlöserkirche in Jerusalem, Karl-Heinz Ronecker (ed.) on behalf of the 'Jerusalem-Stiftung' and 'Jerusalemsverein', Leipzig: Evangelische Verlags-Anstalt, 1998, pp. 81–100. ISBN 3-374-01706-1.
- Guérin, V. (1880). Description Géographique Historique et Archéologique de la Palestine (in French). Vol. 3: Galilee, pt. 1. Paris: L'Imprimerie Nationale.
- Hadawi, S. (1970). "Village Statistics of 1945: A Classification of Land and Area ownership in Palestine". Palestine Liberation Organization Research Center. Archived from the original on 8 December 2018.
- Karmon, Y. (1960). "An Analysis of Jacotin's Map of Palestine" (PDF). Israel Exploration Journal. 10 (3, 4): 155–173, 244–253. Archived from the original (PDF) on 22 December 2019.
- Mills, E., ed. (1932). Census of Palestine 1931. Population of Villages, Towns and Administrative Areas. Jerusalem: Government of Palestine.
- Mitler, Itamar (29 August 2010). "Alonē Abba Final Report". Hadashot Arkheologiyot – Excavations and Surveys in Israel (122).
- Moderow, Hans Martin Kuno, Deutsches evangelisches Leben am Karmel [title translated into German Protestant life at the Carmel], Potsdam: Stiftungsverlag, 1910.
- Palmer, E.H. (1881). The Survey of Western Palestine: Arabic and English Name Lists Collected During the Survey by Lieutenants Conder and Kitchener, R. E. Transliterated and Explained by E.H. Palmer. Committee of the Palestine Exploration Fund.
- Porat, Leea (26 July 2009). "Alonēy Abba Preliminary Report". Hadashot Arkheologiyot – Excavations and Surveys in Israel (121).
- Rhode, H. (1979). Administration and Population of the Sancak of Safed in the Sixteenth Century. Columbia University. Archived from the original on 1 March 2020.
- Schumacher, G. (1888). "Population list of the Liwa of Akka". Quarterly Statement - Palestine Exploration Fund. 20: 169–191.
- Sauer, Paul: Vom Land um den Asperg im Namen Gottes nach Palästina und Australien: Die wechselvolle Geschichte der Tempelgesellschaft, lecture held on 20 October 1995 in Burgstetten on the occasion of the 750th anniversary of Kirschenhardthof, printed as Schriftenreihe TG, No. 1 (1996)
