= Georg David Hardegg =

German businessman and co-founder of the German Templer Society

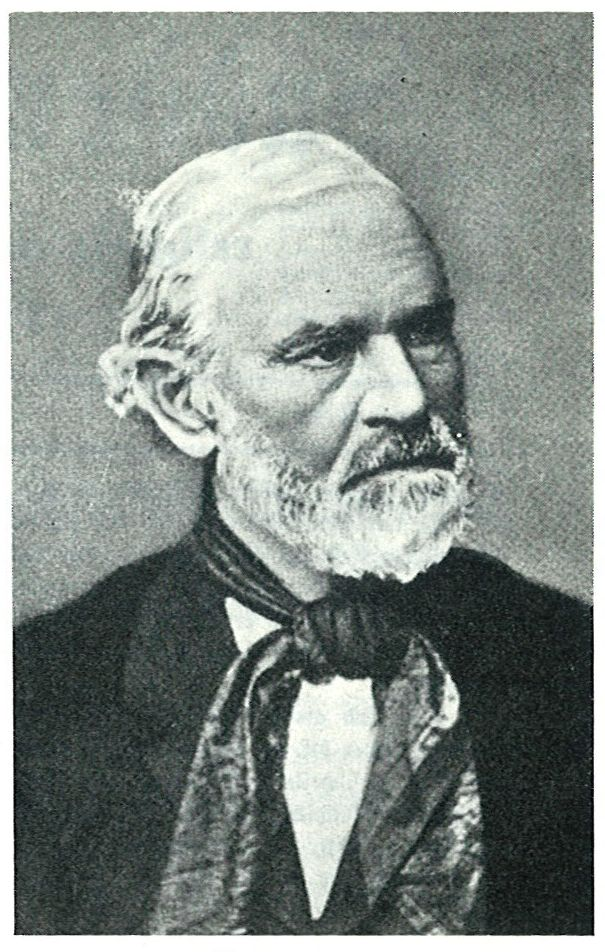
Georg David Hardegg (1812–1879)

Georg David Hardegg (April 2, 1812 – July 1, 1879) co-founded the German Temple Society with Christoph Hoffmann.

== Early years ==
George David Hardegg was born in Eglosheim, north west of Ludwigsberg, Württemberg, in south west Germany, and was the second son of Johann Friedrich Hardegg and Sabine Eiselen. After leaving the grammar school in Ludwigsburg and completing a course in business studies, he travelled first to Amsterdam and then Antwerp, where in 1830, the Belgian Revolution inspired in him an interest in politics. Two years later, in Paris, he came in contact with the French club "Les amis du peuple" and was also introduced to German republicans. It was at this point that he decided to abandon business in favour of medicine, returning to Württemberg in December 1831 with the intention of studying medicine in Tübingen from the autumn of 1832. He soon became involved in a major revolt against the establishment, working as a participant in the Franckh-Koseritz conspiracy to overthrow the Wurttemberg monarchy in 1832. Tried for high treason, he spent 9 years as a prisoner in Hohenasperg political prison, and following his release in 1839 he was forced to leave Württemberg and go into exile.

== First encounter with Christoph Hoffmann ==
In 1840 Hardegg settled in Schaffhausen, Switzerland, working first as an accountant, and then as manager of a trading house. On the 30th anniversary of his reign in 1846, Wilhelm I of Württemberg granted Hardegg amnesty, at which point he returned to Ludwigsburg and opened a leather goods shop.

It was during his time in prison that Hardegg became interested in Christian mysticism, with a strong conviction that God's people would be given spiritual gifts, particularly healing, just as the early Christians had been. In 1848 he first came across Christoph Hoffmann when he supported him in a campaign for a seat in the National Assembly in Frankfurt, and a year later he met Hoffmann in person, by which time he had read Hoffmann's pamphlet, Voices of Prophecy regarding Babylon and God's People.

In the spring of 1853 a dispute arose between Russia and Turkey in connection with holy sites in Palestine, triggering the Crimean War a few months later. With the end to centuries of Turkish sovereignty in Palestine apparently on the horizon, and the creation of Christian settlements in Palestine now a possibility, Hoffmann saw a clear path towards his goal of bringing together God's people in Jerusalem. This sentiment found a willing partner in his new friend, Hardegg.

== Birth of the Templer Movement ==
During this early period, what was to later become the Templer Movement was known as the "Friends of Jerusalem". On 24 August 1854 Hoffmann and Hardegg set up a meeting in Ludwigsburg, at which they announced to the general public the establishment of the "Society for the Gathering of God's People in Jerusalem”. During this event a petition was written to the National Assembly in Frankfurt, asking it to intervene with the Turkish Sultan in order to enable the “people of God” to settle in Palestine. Despite receiving a negative response from the Assembly Hoffmann and Hardegg were unperturbed. In the July 1855 edition of their magazine, the South-German Sentinel, which had been launched in 1845, Hoffmann explained that in bringing God's people together they planned to establish a way of life which, focused on the word of God, would do away with the spiritual forces of darkness. In the article he also defined the millennium, which would take place after Christ's second coming, and would involve the conversion of the entire world, the motive for bringing together God's people. Unperturbed by the negative and damning opinion of Samuel Gobat, the Evangelical Bishop of Jerusalem, Hoffmann and his committee sent him a letter clearly stating their intention of building a community based on Biblical teachings and enclosing their document, Constitution of God's People.

== Plans for a feasibility trip to Palestine ==
In August 1855 Hoffmann and fellow Templer Christoph Paulus reported on their principles and plans at the Conference of the Evangelical Alliance in Paris. As opposition from the clergy mounted, the Friends of Jerusalem decided to put together plans for a feasibility study to Palestine, as well as setting up a community at home where they could prepare spiritually, physically and mentally for their mission. They chose the Kirschenhardthof, close to Ludwigsberg, and at one time part of a large estate in Hochberg, although shortly after their arrival in 1856, a typhoid epidemic devastated several families during the following spring. Unperturbed by hardships and ongoing criticism from both the evangelical and Catholic sectors, Hardegg and Hoffmann continued promoting their vision through public meetings. It was during this period that they made the decision to rename themselves the Temple Society, and with mounting funds and letters of support coming from as far away as the United States of America, they were able to plan a feasibility trip to Palestine.

On February 8, 1858, Hardegg, Hoffmann and the agriculturist J. Bubeck, set out on their journey across Europe, landing in Jaffa on 14 March 1858, and visiting Jerusalem, Bethlehem, Hebron, Beersheba, Nablus, Nazareth, Acre, Haifa, and Tiberius before returning home. Following their return Bubeck concluded that the plan to settle in Palestine was unrealistic due to conditions and lack of sufficient funding.

As soon as Hardegg arrived back at the Kirschenhardthof he launched an attack on the management team's running of affairs during his absence, and set himself up as the secular head. By this time his powerful personality and strong opinions were already causing an uneasy atmosphere, despite which his partner, Hoffmann, managed to keep a positive focus on their main aim, which was to settle in Palestine, writing, “I had set foot in the land that was to be my home. Palestine! The land we fervently hoped would be the centre of the world's universal religion: The salvation of all mankind.”

== Becoming an independent religion, the ’German Temple’ ==
Following their return and a feedback meeting, some families withdrew from the project when they realised that moving to Palestine would take time to organise. Hardegg and Hoffmann, however, were spurred on by the start of the Franco-Austrian war in 1859, viewing it as a sign of the approaching apocalypse, with the supposition that Napoleon III was the beast which comes up from the bottomless pit and predictions in connection with the coming of the Antichrist and the return of Christ.

In June 1861 a meeting was held at the Kirschenhardthof, at which the decision was made to become an independent religion, with the name, 'German Temple’. This new development, which involved withdrawal from the recognised Church, enraged the clergy of the Evangelical Church in Württemberg, resulting in the loss of basic rights and attacks on Templer property. Differences of opinion between leaders of the community in regard to the main purpose of the Society also caused difficulties, Hardegg taking the view that emphasis should be on the spiritual aspect entirely, including miracles and healing, with their overarching mission being the rebuilding of the Holy Land, the reestablishment of the Temple in Jerusalem and the conversion of the Jews. Despite disagreeing with Hardegg's views, Hoffmann focused instead on his capacity for organisation, believing it to be vital in achieving their aim. Whilst Hoffmann adopted the position of Bishop of the Temple Society, Hardegg established a 'School for Prophets’, training young men in Temple doctrine and sending missionaries out to America, Russia and Palestine. In 1866 the subject of spiritual healing caused a further rift and a growing mistrust between Hoffmann and Hardegg, when Hoffmann exposed as fraud a woman who claimed to be ‘obsessed’, with Hardegg reluctant to admit that he had been deceived.

== Establishing Templer communities in Palestine ==
Despite their differences, Hoffmann and Hardegg forged ahead with their plans, setting up a settlement fund in February 1868, and selecting Nazareth as their first goal. Following a farewell party in July 1868, attended by over 1000 Templers and friends, Hoffmann, Hardegg, and their families finally left for Palestine on 6 August 1868.

Having travelled through Germany, Hungary, Serbia and Bulgaria, and across the Black Sea, the party spent some time in Constantinople, where they unsuccessfully attempted to obtain a lease from the Turkish Government for land on Mount Carmel, in Haifa. With their intended destination still being close to Nazareth, they continued their journey, although upon their arrival in Beirut in mid-October, the Consul, General Weber, advised them to abandon their plans for Nazareth since it was too far from civilisation. Advice also came from a missionary from the Church Missionary Society of Germany stationed in Nazareth, Reverend James Huber, with whom they had had precious correspondence, and who recommended Haifa due to its harbour, postal connections and excellent climate.

Hardegg and Hoffmann, along with their families, arrived in Haifa at the end of October 1868, and by the spring of 1869 not only had they had managed to acquire land for a settlement, but they had also been joined by a group of Templers who had unsuccessfully attempted to settle in Nazareth. However, as Hardegg's overbearing personality caused escalating tension between the two leaders, Hoffmann decided to move south to Jaffa in order to create a second Templer settlement, eventually leading to new colonies in several other locations.

With Hardegg now in charge of the colony in Haifa, he was able to supervise the building of the first houses with the aid of Templer Jacob Schumacher, who had arrived in 1869 from Ohio, America. Within four years 38 homes had been built along both sides of a new street named Karmelstrasse, later Ben Gurion Avenue, which stretched from the Mediterranean Sea towards the foot of Mount Carmel. Attempts to establish vineyards on the slopes of Mount Carmel were unsuccessful, whilst a focus on trade and construction, especially transport for both people and goods, soon brought financial reward and eventually, a thriving tourist industry.

== Encountering the Baháʼí Faith ==
In June 1871 the Sentinel carried an article written by Jacob Schumacher, in which he mentioned the arrival in Palestine, two months before Hardegg and Hoffmann, of some Baháʼís who had been sent as prisoners to the ancient city of Acre, just across the bay from Haifa: "I can give notice of yet another spiritual phenomenon which can strengthen our belief. This concerns 70 persons, who have been banished to Acca on account of their beliefs. Mr Hardegg has already spent considerable time and effort trying to discover the actual basis of their beliefs, and had dealings with them through an interpreter just yesterday. He has found that this people base themselves on the Holy Scriptures and, like us, are awaiting the hour of Redemption in God's Kingdom. The home of this movement is the Persian border-country near Baghdad. The greater part of these Persian friends of the Bible are still to be found in their homeland. Since the Shah was unable to suppress the movement, he has taken captive the leaders and sent them into exile ever further from their homeland until they finally arrived in Acca. These people have endured the ordeals and agonies of the first Christians, have no connections with any European missionary society and live the simple Bible beliefs untouched by European influence ---- could the signs of the times be clearer? What more could happen to show us what times we are living in?"

By this time a few Baháʼís had settled in Haifa, which Hardegg mentioned in an article in the Sentinel in July 1871; he had received a letter from Bahá’u’lláh, a rough translation of which was sent to the English Church Missionary Society by the Reverend John Zeller, a Protestant missionary living in Nazareth. In his article Hardegg reported, "In the town of Haifa by Carmel live a few Persians, who earn their living as metal and wood-workers. They stand out on account of their sensible and friendly faces and their Persian dress. They are members of a Persian sect, the leader and members of which, together with wives, children and servants, to the number of about 80 souls, are confined by the Ottoman government to Acca, three hours from here. An acquaintance sprung up between myself and these persons in Haifa and, in the course of our exchanges, I received the impression that these people, despite all the obscurity of their knowledge, were seeking truth. In order to be more accurately informed, I sought an interview with the leader, Bahá'u'lláh, which may be translated as 'the Light or Illuminer of God'; his family name is Nuri, formerly large landowners in Persia. The interview took place on 2 June in Acca with the son of Bahá'u'lláh, 'Abbas Effendi, a man of twenty-seven years, one of the educated inhabitants of Acca acting as interpreter. I opened by saying to 'Abbas Effendi that if my communication with him would bring about difficulties with the authorities, I would leave it to his discretion to discontinue. To this he replied: in Persian there is a saying: beyond black, there is no other colour, i.e. After so much suffering it could hardly become worse.”

James Huber, a fellow missionary of John Zeller at the English Church Missionary Society in Nazareth, had accompanied Hardegg during his visit to Akka, reporting in his Annual letter of November 1872 : “About a month ago, I had occasion to see some of the Persian 'Baabys' at Akka. As the Germans have a colony at Caiffa, [Haifa] which being about nine miles distant, some of the Persians came several times to Mr Hardegg, the head man of the colony, and he thought that they are anxious to learn something about Christianity, but he could never exactly ascertain their real desire, and as they invited him, and promised him an interview with their Prophet, 'Behau Allah' (Lustre of God) Mr Hardegg wrote to me, inviting me to join him. I informed Mr Zeller about it, and he thought it also interesting and told me to go. From Caiffa we went early in the morning and arrived at Akka at 8 o'clock. We went on a carriage kept by the German Colonists which being a great improvement and a pleasure to every one who wishes for the spiritual and temporal welfare of this country.

== Withdrawal from the Temple Society and final years ==
Meanwhile, life in the Templer colony in Haifa suffered tensions and divisions due to Hardegg's determination to carry out plans without consultation, as a result of which the Central Council in Germany withdrew their funding. By 1874 the colony was unable to function at all, and on reaching out to Hoffmann, by now well established in Jaffa, he told them that the only solution was for Hardegg to resign, which he did on March 31, 1874. He also cancelled his membership of the Temple Society, as did around a third of the Haifa community. Both the Lutheran Church of Sweden and the Anglican Church Missionary Society refused their requests to join, and in 1878 Hardegg created his own Temple Society which waned following his death in July 1879. He is buried in the Templer cemetery in Haifa.
