= German Colony, Haifa =

Neighborhood in Haifa, originally a 19th-century German Templer settlement

Coordinates: 32°49′12″N 34°59′26″E

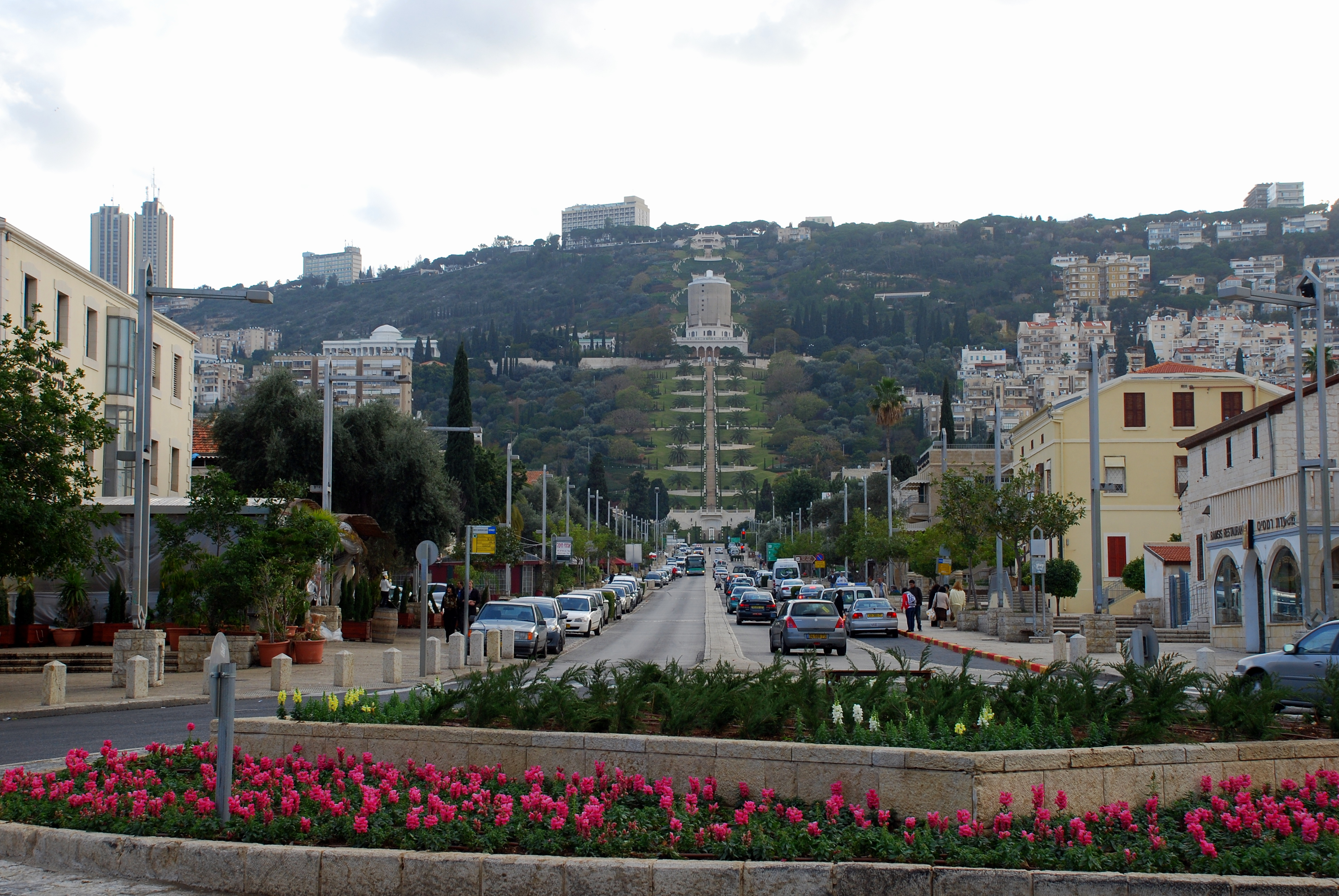
German Colony, Haifa

The German Colony (Hebrew: המושבה הגרמנית, romanized: HaMoshava HaGermanit; Arabic: الحي الألمانية; German: Deutsche Kolonie) is an area of Haifa established in 1868 as a Christian German Templer Colony in Ottoman Palestine. It was the first of several colonies established by the group in the Holy Land. Others were founded in Sarona near Jaffa, Galilee and Jerusalem. Some of the original buildings are still surviving today, and the area continues to be visited, lived in, and in use.

== History ==
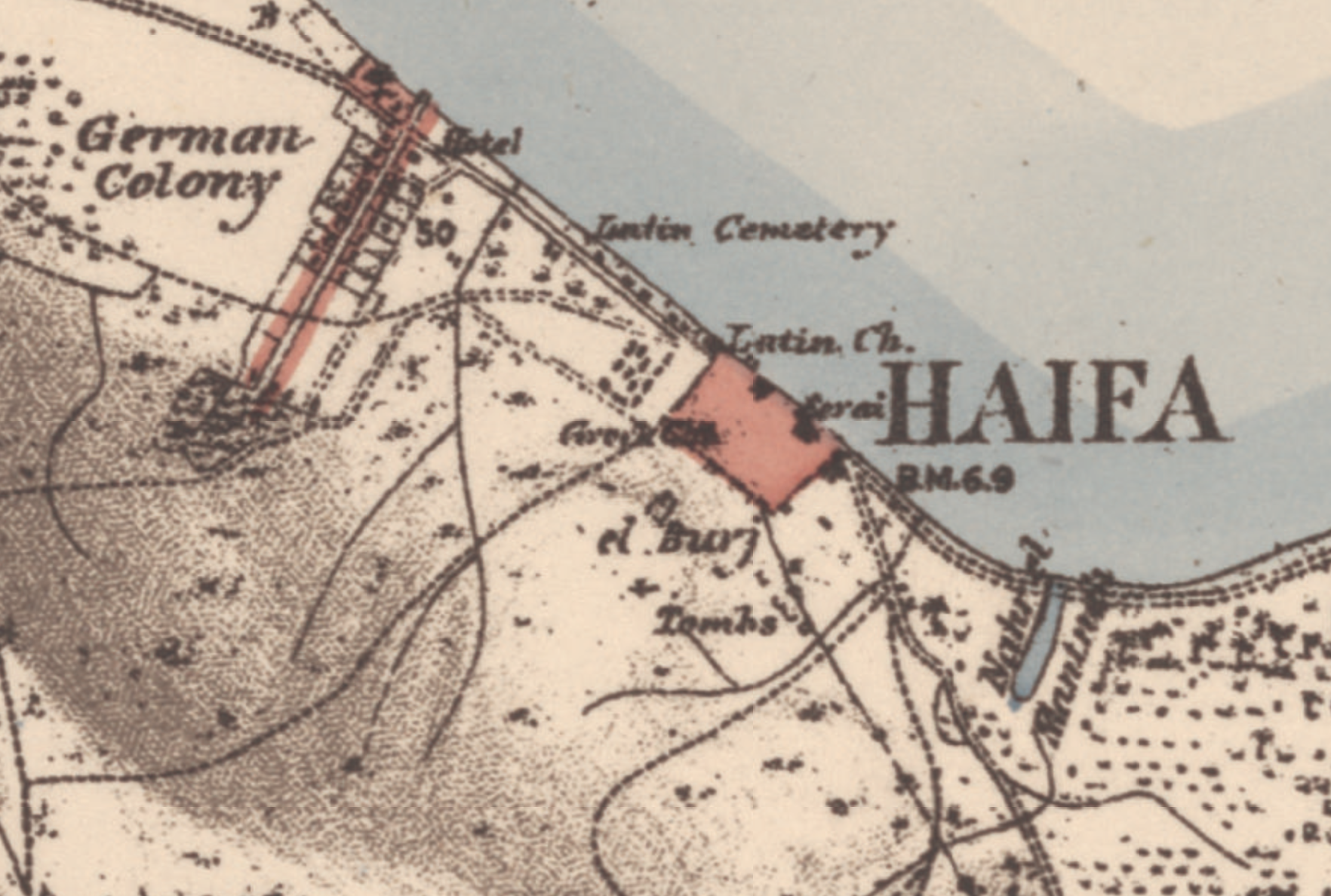
Location of the German Colony in Haifa in the 1870s (PEF Survey of Palestine)

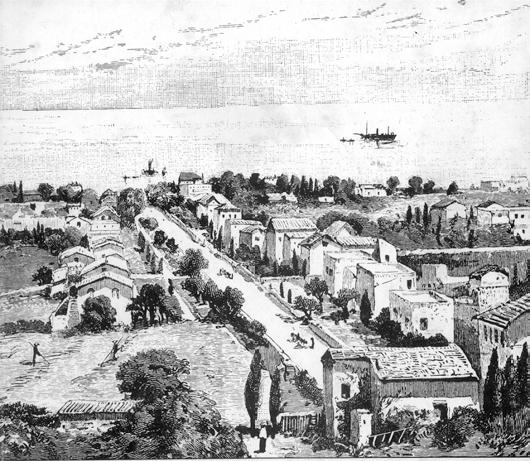
German colony in Haifa, 1875

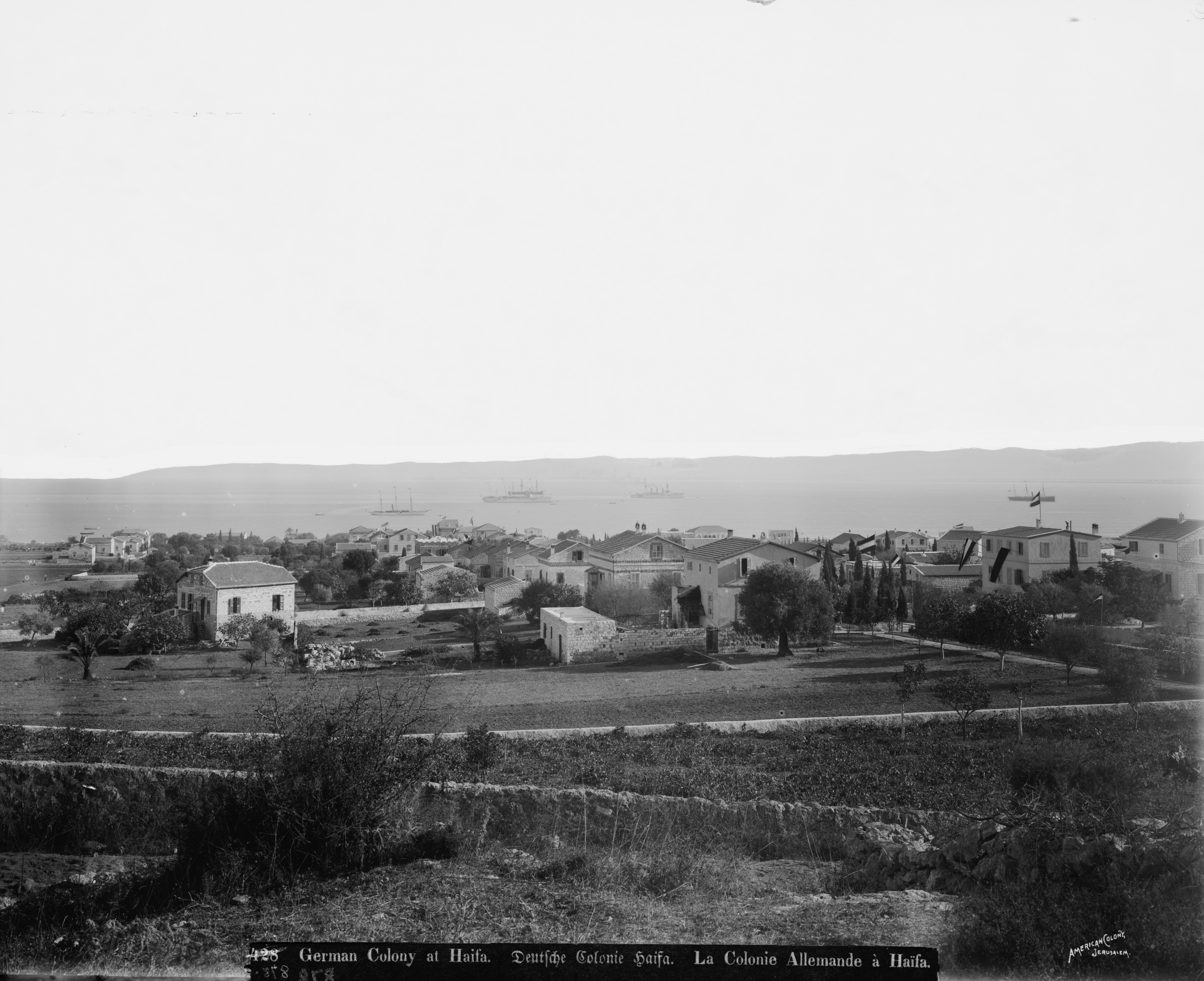
German colony of Haifa

The Templers, a religious Protestant sect formed in southern Germany in the 19th century, settled in Palestine at the urging of their leader, Christoph Hoffmann, in the belief that living in the Holy Land would hasten the second coming of Christ. The Templers built a colony in keeping with strict urban planning principles and introduced local industries that brought modernity to Palestine, which had long been neglected by the Ottomans. They were the first to organize regular transportation services between Jaffa, Acre and Nazareth, which also allowed for mail delivery.

Gottlieb Schumacher's parents came from Tübingen, Germany, to Zanesville, Ohio, where he was born. His father, Jacob Schumacher, belonged to the German Protestant Temple Society, which founded the German Colony in Haifa, Palestine, in the 1860s. After relocating to the Templer colony with his family in 1869, Jacob Schumacher rose to the position of chief architect and builder. The Schumacher building was hit by a missile fired from Lebanon on November 17, 2024. The building includes the Schumacher Institute, which belongs to the University of Haifa and gathers many collections and books within it.

In 1874 the Christian denomination of the Temple Society underwent a schism and later envoys of the Evangelical State Church of Prussia's older Provinces successfully proselytised among the schismatics, making up about a third of the colonists. Thus the Colony became a place of partisans of two different Christian denominations and their respective congregations.

While in Germany the Templers were regarded as sectarians, the Evangelical proselytes gained major financial and mental support from German Lutheran and Evangelical church bodies. This created an atmosphere of mistrust and envy among the German colonists in Haifa. On July 17, 1886, the proselytes appealed to the Supreme Church Council of the State Church of Prussia's older Provinces to be accepted as and helped to found an Evangelical congregation. In 1891 the Jerusalemsverein (English: Association of Jerusalem), a Berlin-based Evangelical charitable organisation to subsidize Protestant activities in the Holy Land, decided to support the new Haifa congregation.

The Jerusalemsverein sent and sponsored a teacher for the congregants' children. In 1892 the Jerusalemsverein decided to lend the congregation the money needed to build a prayer hall. Otto Fischer (1813–1910), a Haifa resident, donated the land at the foot of Mount Carmel, and the Haifa engineer Ernst August Voigt gratuitously drew the constructions plans. In September 1892 the constructions started and pastor Carl Schlicht (Jerusalem) inaugurated the community centre, including a prayer hall and two school rooms, on July 2, 1893. The community center and school buildings became the Haifa City Museum in 2011. Starting in the same year the Jerusalemsverein sponsored a pastor for the new Haifa Evangelical Congregation.

The teacher Herrmann initiated a choir. From 1900 on, Marie Teckhaus, a Deaconess sponsored by the Kaiserswerth Deaconesses Mother House, ran a medical station, open for patients of all denominations and religions. In 1907 the congregation built a separate school building, but later the discrepancies between the two German-speaking congregations – Evangelical and Templer – shrank, thus before World War I the schools were pooled.

The population fluctuated between 300 and 400 settlers between 1870 and 1914. Sixty of the colonists were American citizens and their leader, Jacob Schumacher served as the U.S. consular agent for Haifa and northern Palestine. Due to their population increase and the ongoing urbanisation of Haifa, the colonists searched to buy lands in order to found new settlements. These were to be exclusively monodenominational. Thus the Templers settled in Bethlehem of Galilee and the Evangelical Protestants founded the neighbouring Waldheim.

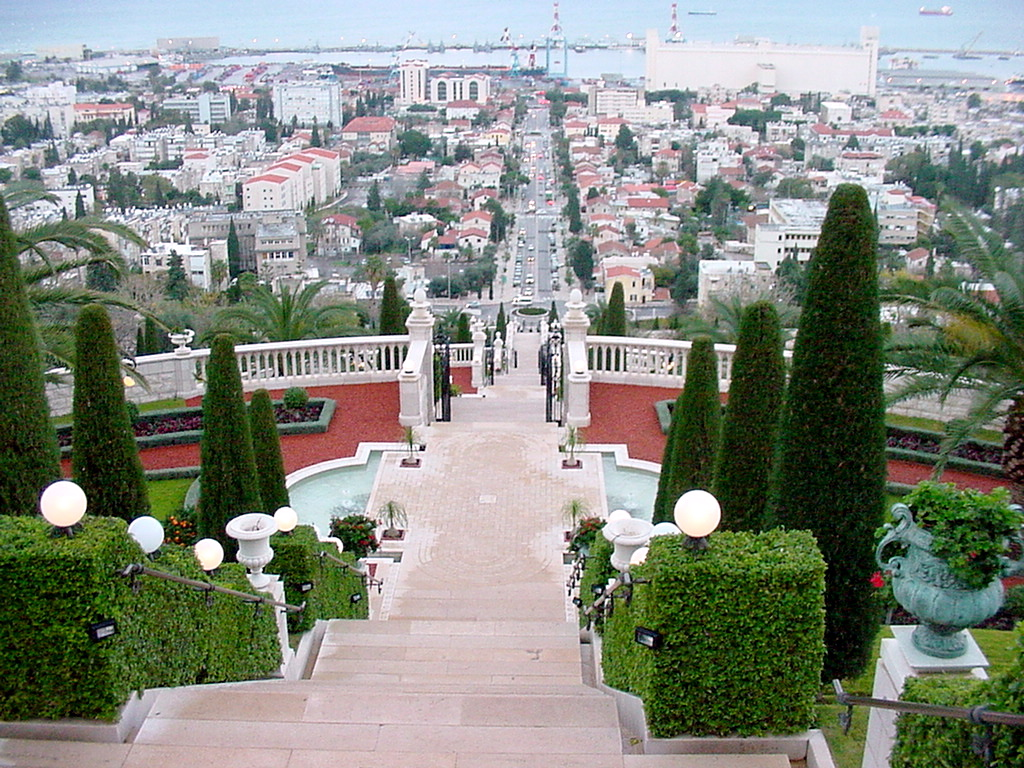
View down from the Bahá'í Gardens at the top of the German Colony.

Employing modern farming methods, the Templers introduced soil fertilization, better methods of crop rotation and new crops such as potatoes. They imported agricultural machinery and engaged in "mixed farming," combining dairy farming and field crops.

Registering the land was problematic due to back taxes and local boundary disputes, which sometimes turned violent. The Templers thus abandoned farming in favor of industry and tourism. They built hotels, opened workshops and established an olive oil soap factory.

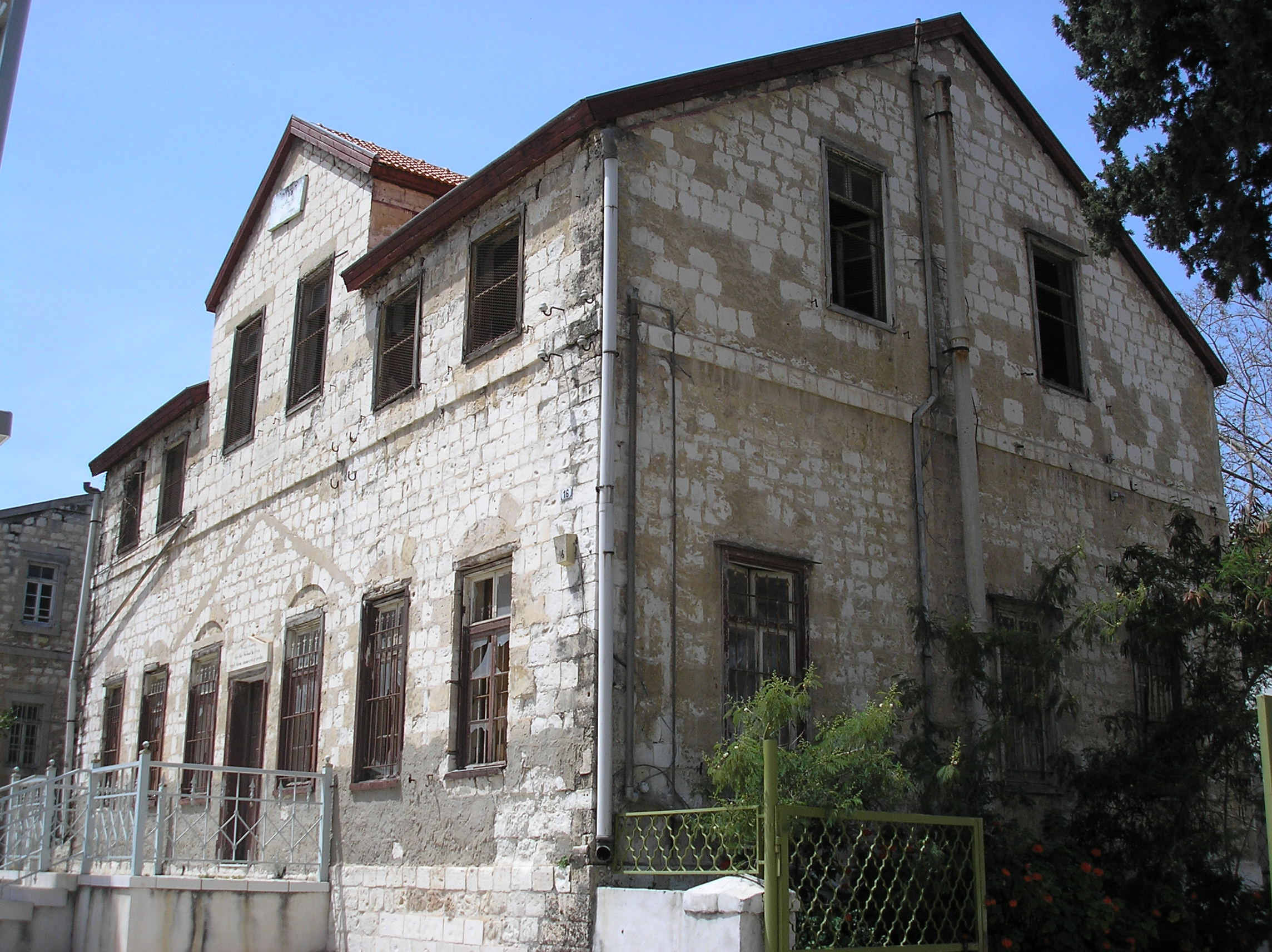
Old Templer house in German Colony

The affluent German colony stood out in its poor surroundings. The only doctor in the city lived there, and one of the residents was a construction engineer. By the end of the Ottoman era the colony had 750 inhabitants, 150 houses and dozens of businesses. The colony was the first model of urban planning in Palestine, with a main street running from north to south (today, Ben-Gurion Boulevard), leading down to the harbor. Smaller streets branched out from the main street. At the southern end of the colony were the Templer vineyards (where the Bahá'í World Centre stands today). The colony was built as a garden city with single-family homes surrounded by gardens and shade trees lining the main boulevard.

The Templer Cemetery Haifa

In the Haifa cemetery are mainly buried the dead of the nearby "German Colony" (established in 1868) as well as the dead of the daughter colony "Carmelheim" (today the Carmel Center). The cemetery began operating in 1869. From the main path (east-west) a path branches off on a north-south axis, which divides the Templer complex in two and leads to a large monument in memory of the German dead from Haifa who fell in WWI.

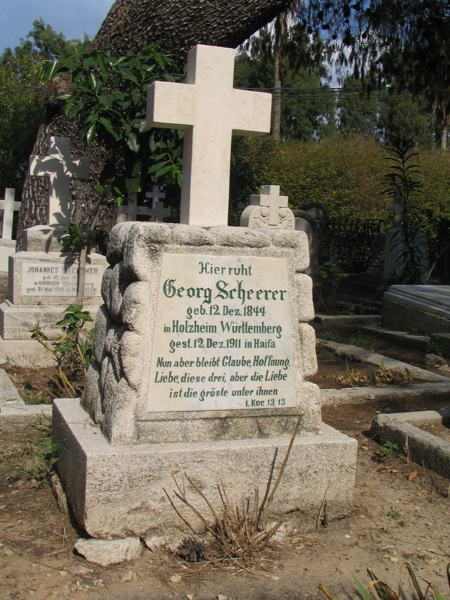
The Tombstone of Scheerer Georg interred in the Templer Cemetery Haifa.

== Nazi affiliation and expulsion ==
After the outbreak of World War I in 1914, the German Empire allied with the Ottoman Empire; a large number of German colonists in Palestine joined the Imperial German Army during the conflict and fought against Allied forces in the Sinai and Palestine campaign. When Allied forces captured Palestine from the Ottoman Empire, the German colonists were regarded by Allied occupational authorities as enemy aliens, but were not deported back to Germany.

In 1937, 34% of German colonists in Palestine were members of the Nazi Party. During the coronation of George VI and Elizabeth on 12 May 1937, all German colonies flew the flag of Nazi Germany. After the outbreak of World War II in 1939, all colonists with German citizenship were detained by the British authorities and sent, together with Italian and Hungarian citizens in Palestine, to internment camps in Waldheim and Bethlehem of Galilee. On 31 July 1941, 661 German colonists were deported via Egypt to Australia by the British, leaving 345 in Palestine.

== Restoration and modern use ==
Some of the original Templer homes have been restored in recent years. Buildings along Ben-Gurion Boulevard have been turned into cafés, boutiques, hotels, and restaurants. One houses the Haifa City Museum, and the colony has become a center of Haifa nightlife with pubs and bars being a common sight. Starting in particular during the 1990s, the area witnessed a growing number of Arab-Israeli-owned cafés and bars opened to offer spaces for small performances and exhibitions by Arab-Israeli artists.

== Bibliography ==
- Alex Carmel (Hebrew: אלכס כרמל), Die Siedlungen der württembergischen Templer in Palästina (1868–1918) (^{1}1973), [התיישבות הגרמנים בארץ ישראל בשלהי השלטון הטורקי: בעיותיה המדיניות, המקומיות והבינלאומיות, ירושלים :חמו"ל, תש"ל; גרמנית], Stuttgart: Kohlhammer Verlag, ^{3}2000, (Veröffentlichungen der Kommission für geschichtliche Landeskunde in Baden-Württemberg: Reihe B, Forschungen; vol. 77). ISBN 3-17-016788-X.
- Alex Carmel (Hebrew: אלכס כרמל), Geschichte Haifas in der türkischen Zeit 1516-1918 [תולדות חיפה בימי התורכים, חיפה: הוצאת הספרים האקדמית של אוניברסיטת חיפה, 1969; גרמנית], Wiesbaden: Harrassowitz, 1975, (Abhandlungen des Deutschen Palästina-Vereins; vol. 3). ISBN 3-447-01636-1
- Ejal Jakob Eisler (Hebrew: איל יעקב אייזלר), "«Kirchler» im Heiligen Land: Die evangelischen Gemeinden in den württembergischen Siedlungen Palästinas (1886–1914)", In: Dem Erlöser der Welt zur Ehre: Festschrift zum hundertjährigen Jubiläum der Erlöserkirche in Jerusalem, Karl-Heinz Ronecker (ed.) on behalf of the 'Jerusalem-Stiftung' and 'Jerusalemsverein', Leipzig: Evangelische Verlags-Anstalt, 1998, pp. 81–100. ISBN 3-374-01706-1.
