= Jacob Schumacher =

American diplomat (1825–1891)

Jacob Schumacher was an architect and engineer who later served as a United States diplomat.

Jacob Friedrich Schumacher was born in Tübingen (April 16, 1825) Württemberg, Germany and emigrated 1848 to the United States where he resided in Wheeling, West Virginia, since 1851 in Zanesville, Ohio. He later emigrated to Palestine as a member of the "Tempelgesellschaft" (The Temple Society), arriving in 1869. He was instrumental in working for the German Templers in the Holy Land and planning the German Colony, Haifa. He was an architect and engineer and served as the U.S consular agent in Haifa from 1872 to 1891.

He died on September 7, 1891.

Jacob Schumacher was the father of Gottlieb Schumacher, architect and archaeologist.
