= Christoph Hoffmann =

German religious leader (1815–1885)

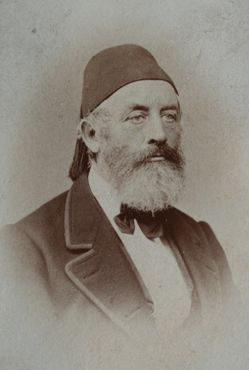

Gottlob Christoph Jonathan Hoffmann (December 2, 1815 – December 8, 1885) was born in Leonberg in the Kingdom of Württemberg, Germany. His parents were Beate Baumann (1774–1852) and Gottlieb Wilhelm Hoffmann (1771–1846), who was chairman of the Unitas Fratrum congregation in Korntal. Gottlieb's theological thinking was inspired by reading the works of Johann Albrecht Bengel, whose studies had led him to the conclusion that Christ would return in 1836.

Christoph Hoffmann had a Pietist-Christian background and enjoyed a Christian education with the Brethren congregation in Korntal. As a young man he studied theology in Tübingen. An opponent of the much better known liberal theologian David Friedrich Strauss, Hoffmann was elected to the First National German Parliament, which met in Frankfurt am Main in 1848.

The failure of his efforts to create a better Christian State through politics caused him to return to the roots of Christianity as expressed by Jesus. He became convinced that Jesus had called for a radical change of attitude in people. The better state of being after such a change of attitude he saw as the Kingdom of God which was to be established. To this end he applied for the position of a missionary inspector with the Protestant St. Chrischona Pilgrim Mission of Basel in 1853, but left the position after two years.

Hoffmann dedicated his life to collecting people striving for such a "kingdom" and setting up communities in which their striving would express itself in daily life. Initially (1854) known as the Friends of Jerusalem, the group in June 1861 formed itself into an independent Christian religious organisation known as Deutscher Tempel, its members identified themselves as Templers. In 1868 the Templers started to create settlements in Palestine.

In Jaffa, the Templers were able to buy some houses and land from failed colonists around George Adams, returning to the US in 1869. On 5 March 1869 also Peter Martin Metzler, a missionary of St. Chrischona and personal acquaintance of Hoffmann from his times at the Pilgrims' Mission, sold his Jaffa-based mission station, including an infirmary and most of his real estate and other enterprises to the new colonists, before he left Jaffa.

While the Lutheran Evangelical State Church in Württemberg condemned and fought the Templer as apostates, the Prussian position was somewhat milder. Their settlement in the Holy Land found a warm support through Wilhelm Hoffmann (*1806–1873*), who was no apostate from the official church, like his younger brother Christoph. Wilhelm Hoffmann served as one of the royal Prussian court preachers at the Supreme Parish and Collegiate Church in Berlin and was a co-founder and first president of Jerusalem's Association (German: Jerusalemsverein), a charitable organisation founded on 2 December 1852 to support Samuel Gobat's effort as bishop of the Anglo-Prussian Bishopric of Jerusalem. Between 1866 and 1869 Wilhelm Hoffmann dispatched his son Carl Hoffmann (1836–1903) as pastor of the German Protestant congregation of Jerusalem.

Hoffmann fell out with the Temple Society's co-leader Georg David Hardegg (*1812–1879*), so that in June 1874 the Temple denomination underwent a schism with Hardegg and about a third of the Templer seceding from the Temple Society and later mostly returning to an official German Protestant church body. Hoffmann died in the Templer settlement Rephaim near Jerusalem on 8 December 1885.

Hoffmann's literary output focusses on his vision of a New Jerusalem, a community-based Kingdom of God that would eventually spread over all the nations:

- He initiated publication of the religious sentinel Die Süddeutsche Warte in 1845, which later became Die Warte des Tempels and under that name is still, 161 years later, published today as the official voice of the Temple Society.
- In Occident and Orient, Part 1, 2 and 3 first published in 1875, he produced a blueprint for community based social conditions leading towards a kingdom of God in the Middle East
- Mein Weg nach Jerusalem came out in 1884 and can be seen as an autobiography of his struggle to bring his vision to reality.
- with five Sendschreiben produced over the years Hoffmann tried to face some of the religious and social difficulties arising at the time.

== Christoph Hoffmann II, his son ==
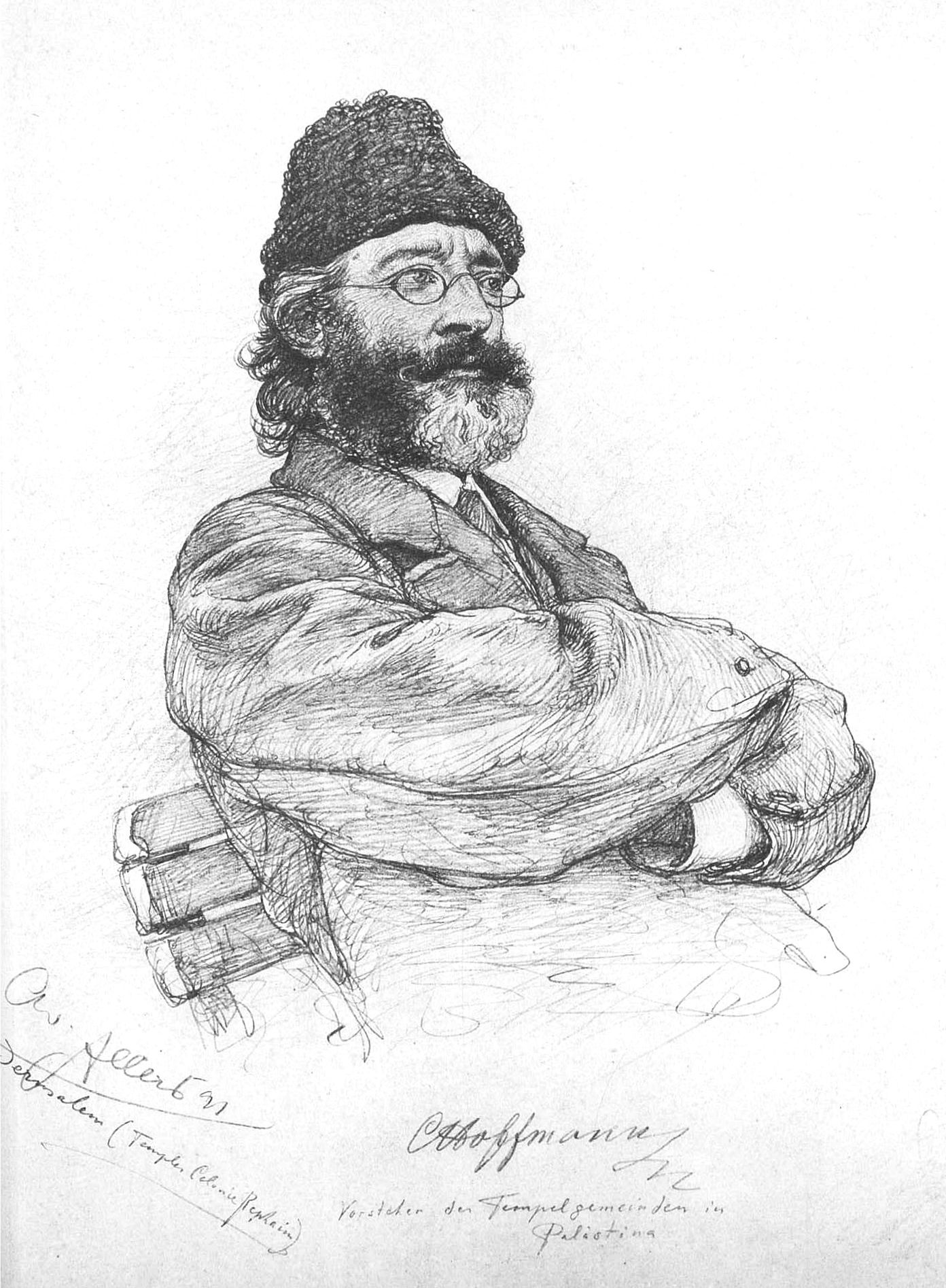
Christoph Hoffmann II (1847-1911)

Hoffmann’s son Christoph (1847-1911) became the leader of the Palestinian Templer in 1890, while from 1884 to 1890 Christoph Paulus was the leader.
