= Immanuel Church (Tel Aviv) =

Protestant church in Tel Aviv, Israel

- כנסיית עמנואל; Immanuelkirche; Immanuelkirken
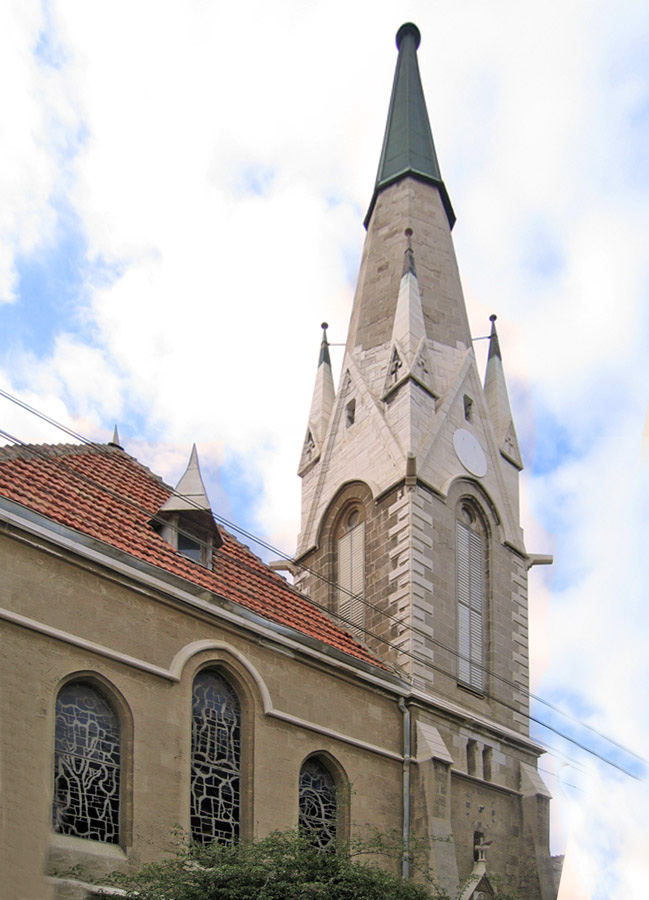
- The northern façade towards Beer-Hofmann street רחוב בר-הופמן

Religion
- Affiliation: Protestant: Lutheran since 1955; until 1940 United Protestant (Lutheran & Reformed)
- District: formerly: Provostry of Jerusalem (1898–1940)
- Province: Norwegian Church Ministry to Israel since 1955; Anglican Diocese of Jerusalem (1940–47); Foreign Dept. of the Church of the old-Prussian Union (1906–40)
- Leadership: Eyvind Volle

Location
- Location: Tel Aviv, Israel
- Interactive map of Immanuel Church
- Coordinates: 32°03′24″N 34°45′45″E

Architecture
- Architect: Paul Ferdinand Groth
- Style: Neo-Gothic style
- Completed: 1904
- Materials: sandstone and limestone

Website
- www.immanuelchurch-jaffa.com

Immanuel Church (Hebrew: כנסיית עמנואל, Knesiyat Immanu'el; German: Immanuelkirche; Norwegian: Immanuelkirken) is a Protestant church in the American–German Colony neighbourhood of Tel Aviv Israel.

The church was built in 1904 for the German Evangelical community, which used it until its dissolution at the onset of World War II in 1940. In 1955 the Lutheran World Federation transferred control of the church building to the Norwegian Church Ministry to Israel, and a new congregation used it. The church is used by Protestant denominations, including the Messianic movement.

== Historical background ==
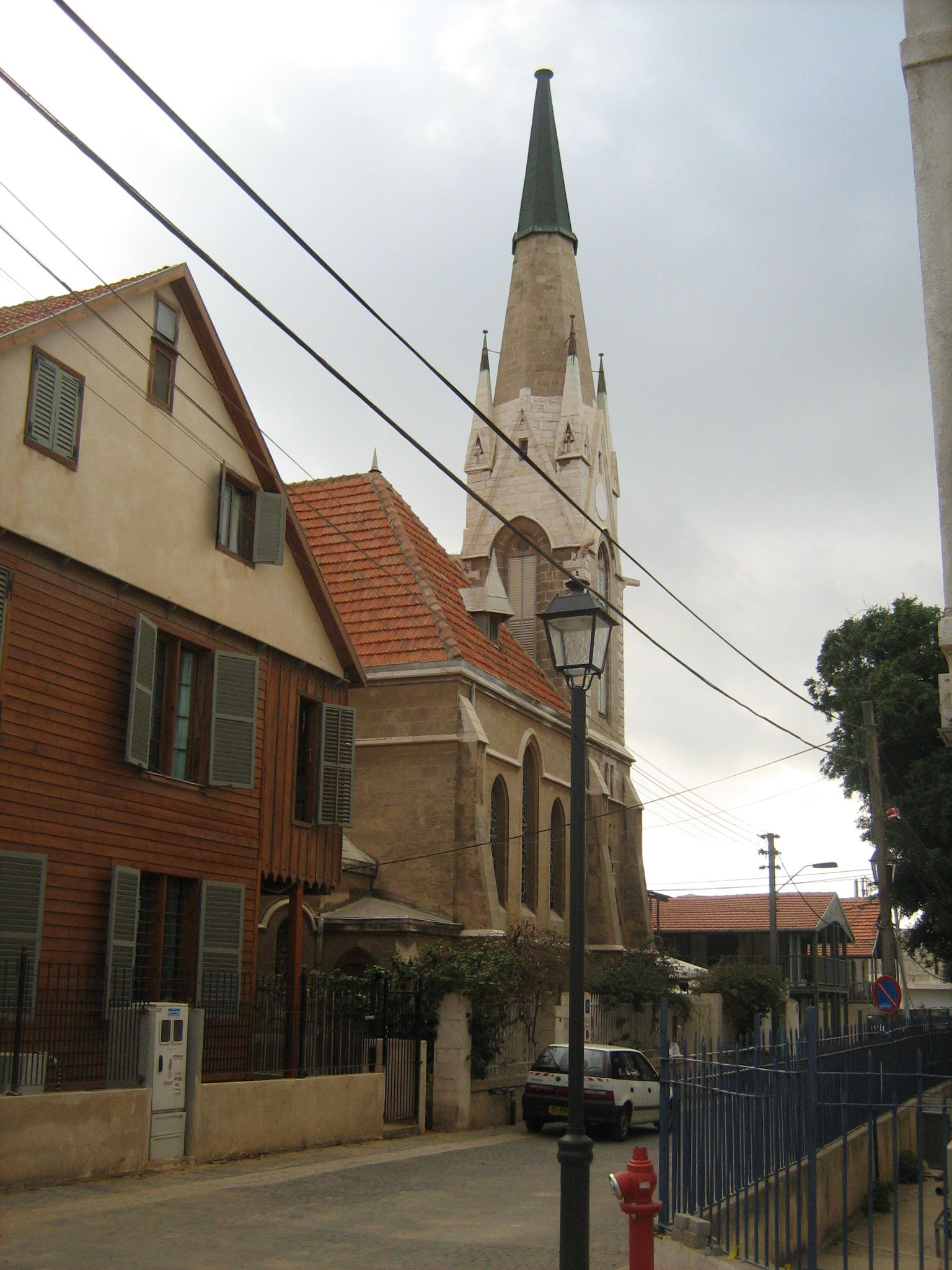
Immanuel Church in Jaffa's American colony

George Adams and Abraham McKenzie, colonists from Maine arrived in Jaffa on 22 September 1866. They founded the American Colony in Jaffa, now part of Tel Aviv-Yafo municipality. They erected their wooden houses from prefabricated segments they had brought with them. Many settlers contracted cholera, and about a third of them died. Most returned to America. In 1869, newly arriving settlers from the Kingdom of Württemberg led by Georg David Hardegg (1812–1879) and Christoph Hoffmann (1815–1885), members of the Temple Society, replaced them.

However, in June 1874 the Temple denomination underwent a schism. Temple leader Hardegg and about a third of the Templers seceded from the Temple Society, after personal and substantial quarrels with Christoph Hoffmann.

== First congregation (1899-1948) ==
=== History ===
==== Establishment ====
In 1885 Pastor Carl Schlicht of the Jerusalem Evangelical congregation started to proselytise among the schismatics and succeeded in forming Evangelical congregations. In 1889 former Templers, Protestant German and Swiss expatriates, and domestic and foreign proselytes established the Evangelical congregation of Jaffa. Johann Georg Kappus sen. (1826–1905) became the first chairman of the congregation, seconded and later followed by his son Johann Georg Kappus jun. (1855–1928).

==== Sponsorship and pastors until 1914 ====
Among the parishioners were wealthy members such as Plato von Ustinov and Wilhelm Friedrich Faber (1863–1923), president of the Deutsche Palästina-Bank, who moved to Jaffa in 1899 when the bank opened its branch there. Ustinov offered the new congregation the hall of his Hôtel du Parc in Jaffa for services.

Starting in 1890 Jerusalem's Association granted Jaffa's Evangelical congregation financial subsidies. The pupils of apostate families had been excluded from the Templer school since 1874. The German government generally co-financed the schools of German language in the Holy Land with about a quarter of their annual budgets since 1880.

The Jerusalem's Association and the Lutheran Evangelical State Church in Württemberg agreed to pay the salary of a professional pastor for the Jaffa congregation. They hired Albert Eugen Schlaich from Korntal, a theologian and educator. He arrived on 10 March 1897 and stayed at Ustinov's hotel until he and his wife found suitable accommodations. The congregation rented the local chapel of the London Society for Promoting Christianity Amongst the Jews for an annual payment of 100 francs of the Latin Monetary Union for its services. Schlaich introduced some Lutheran traditions from Württemberg's state church. In 1900 ca. 30–40 congregants attended services on Sundays in the chapel of the London Jews Missionary Society.

In 1905 Schlaich accused the German Vice Consul Dr. Eugen Büge (1859–1936) in Jaffa to be breaking consular secrets in return for gifts. So Büge was transferred for disciplinary reasons to Aleppo, however, the German Foreign Office urged also Schlaich's transfer, since it considered Schlaich and not Büge to have damaged its reputation abroad. The Evangelical Supreme Ecclesiastical Council, the executive board of the Prussian state church, pressurised Jerusalem's Association to release Schlaich from his office in Jaffa, thus he was appointed for another pastorate in Germany. The Jaffa congregation gave Schlaich a farewell on 25 December 1905, and Georg Johannes Egger (1842) thanked Schlaich and his wife for 9 years of successful pastoral work.

Between 1906 and 1912 the Jerusalem's Association and Evangelical State Church of Württemberg financed Pastor Wilhelm Georg Albert Zeller. He considered the growing Jewish immigration a threat to the Gentile German colonists, reporting their fears, that they could be expelled in the end, and thus recommended their emigration to a German, less populated colony in Africa. He was followed by the charismatic pastor Dr. Eitel-Friedrich Karl Balthasar von Rabenau, again supported by Stuttgart-based sponsors.

On 6 April 1910 Prince Eitel Friedrich of Prussia and his wife Sophie Charlotte of Oldenburg visited Jaffa and Immanuel Church, where they were received by Pastor Zeller.

==== World War I (1914-1917) ====
After the outbreak of World War I the Sublime Porte de facto abolished the personal exterritoriality and consular jurisdiction for foreigners according to Capitulations of the Ottoman Empire on 7 September 1914. Many young male parishioners left Jaffa to join the German Imperial Army. Rabenau accompanied them to serve as military chaplain. The Prussian Evangelical Supreme Ecclesiastical Council ordered his return in October.

The Ottoman authorities forced all enemy missionary institutions to close in October 1914 and many missionary pupils then joined the joint Evangelical-Templer school of Jaffa. Their premises were confiscated for military purposes. In November 1914 the Ottoman Sultan Mehmed V declared in his function as Caliph the Jihad, which aroused fear for anti-Christian atrocities among the parishioners.

The war years were characterised by an increasing inflation of the Ottoman banknotes, causing Jerusalem's Association severe transfer losses at remitting salaries to its collaborators in the Holy Land, since the association had to purchase – in return for marks – foreign exchange denominated in inflationary Ottoman banknotes, which had to be sold again in Jaffa for less inflated Ottoman hard coins at a rate far below par. Until 1916 the Ottoman banknotes had dropped to a ¼, later to _{1}/^{6} of their pre-war rate in mark, which was inflated itself. The war-related scarcity of goods further caused a dearness of most products so Jerusalem's Association had to increase its transfers to the Holy Land.

==== British rule until 1931 ====
On 17 November 1917 Britons captured Jaffa and most male parishioners of Austrian, German or Ottoman nationality from Jaffa and Sarona, including Rabenau, were interned in Wilhelma as enemy nationals. In 1918 the interned men were deported to a camp south of Gaza, while the parishioners remaining in Jaffa were subjected to strict police control. In August 1918 the internees were relocated to Sidi Bishr and Helwan near Alexandria in Egypt. Rabenau and the internees built up congregational life in their Egyptian exile, lasting three years. With the Treaty of Versailles becoming effective on 10 January 1920 the Egyptian camps were dissolved and Rabenau became the internees' coordinator of the closedown. Most internees returned to the Holy Land, except of those banned by a British black list, such as D. Dr. Friedrich Jeremias, Provost of Jerusalem. Rabenau went to Germany to reunite with his family, the Britons refused his return to Jaffa in July 1920. In April 1921 the Prussian Evangelical Supreme Ecclesiastical Council appointed Gustaf Dalman, formerly head of the German Protestant Institute of Archaeology in Jerusalem as Provost at the Evangelical Church of the Redeemer until Albrecht Alt arrived.

In April 1926 Jerusalem's Association appointed Ernst Paetzold as auxiliary pastor for Jaffa. In September 1928 he held a lecture at the annual conference of Levantine Protestant pastors titled "Our congregations in their position towards other groups of German culture". By 1930 the German Jews made up the biggest group of Germans in the Holy Land, however a minority among all Palestinians, the Templers amounted to 1,300, and the remaining 400 Germans were – except of few Catholics (mostly clergy) and few irreligionists – prevailingly Protestant, among them 160 parishioners (as of 1927) of the Jaffa congregation.

In April 1931 Paetzold returned to Germany, and the pastorate remained unstaffed due to financial constraints in the Great Depression.

==== Pre-WWII position vs. the Nazis ====
On October 18–20, 1933 the German Protestant missionary endowments within Deutscher Evangelischer Missionsbund (DEMB) convened in Barmen and rejected the attempt to subject the missionary societies – in the course of the pervasive Gleichschaltung of all civic organisations – to the Nazi-submissive German Evangelical Church. Jerusalem's Association retained its legal independence, successfully rejected the application of the so-called Aryan paragraph for its own employees and the new appointment of its executive board with a majority of two thirds for German Christians.

However, the Nazi-submissive German Christians, holding crucial positions in the bureaucracy of the official Protestant church bodies, found other ways to pressurise the missionary societies. Foreign exchange assigned at non-market rates was exclusively to be disbursed for salaries of German nationals, thus salaries of Palestinian citizens (e.g. Arab Protestants) became very difficult to organise, Jerusalem's Association had to incur debts in Palestine pounds with Deutsche Palästina-Bank, which again had to be permitted by the Nazi government, which submitted any foreign indebtedness of German legal entities to its agreement as part of its austerity policy.

Since missions depended on transferring funds abroad the government rationing of foreign exchange became the means to blackmail their cooperation. Jerusalem's Association gained a certain support within the German Christian-streamlined old-Prussian Evangelical Supreme Ecclesiastical Council and the Confessing Church, which both collected and transferred funds for the efforts of Jerusalem's Association. Since February 1934 the new Ecclesiastical Foreign Department (Kirchliches Außenamt) under German Christian Theodor Heckel (1894–1967) of the new Nazi-submissive German Evangelical Church claimed the supervision of German Protestant missions. Heckel also presided the board of trustees of the Evangelical Jerusalem Foundation since 1933. Heckel decided on behalf of the Ecclesiastical Foreign Department to also subsidise salaries of ecclesiastical employees in Jaffa and Haifa earlier paid by Jerusalem's Association alone.

The Levantine Protestant pastors decided on their annual conference at Easter 1934 (1 April), to keep their congregations out of the German Nazi struggle of the churches . The pastors of Jaffa and Haifa anyway reported, that their congregations felt more related to Jerusalem's Association than to the Evangelical Church of the old-Prussian Union and its Provostry of Jerusalem.

In October 1934 the DEMB convened again in Tübingen, declaring its partisanship with the Confessing Church and its Barmen declaration of May 1934, however, the actual policy depended – case to case – on the opinion of the respective responsible person. While in Germany ecclesiastical media were banned to report on the struggle of the churches, there was no censorship in British Palestine. So Provost Ernst Rhein, the responsible editor of the "Gemeindeblatt", let his then Vicar Georg Weiß (later deacon in Nuremberg) report on the German struggle of the churches, openly siding with the Confessing Church, in his article on the occasion of Harvest Festival (German: Erntedankfest). German Christian Heckel, head of the Ecclesiastical Foreign Department, heftily criticised Rhein and Weiß for that article.

In February 1935 Rabenau, meanwhile a leading representative of the Confessing Church and opponent of Nazism, resigned from doing the German public relations of Jerusalem's Association. After the Brethren Council of the old-Prussian Ecclesiastical Province of Pomerania, the Pomeranian Confessing Church executive, had agreed to release its Vicar Felix Moderow, he moved to Jaffa to serve there as auxiliary pastor from 1935 to 1937. Also Provost Rhein demanded an opponent pastor as his new vicar and chose another Pomeranian theologist, Fritz Maass (1910–2005), as his vicar in Jerusalem.

However, in the German diplomatic service the so-called Aryan paragraph caused the furlough of Jerusalem's German Consul-General Dr. Heinrich Wolff in summer 1935, since his Protestant wife Ilse (d. 1988), serving as presbyter of the Jerusalem Evangelical congregation, counted by the Nazi racist categories as partially Jewish. "Among the German inhabitants in the country, only the [Jews and the] Lutherans expressed sorrow at Wolff's dismissal and their Jerusalem newspaper [Gemeindeblatt] published a warm article in praise of his activities. Similar sentiments were expressed in the Hebrew newspaper Doar Hayom, which lauded his consular activity and heralded his efforts not to hurt the feelings of those opposed to the Nazi regime."

In 1937 Pastor Christian Berg succeeded the retired Detwig von Oertzen in Haifa. Berg had been furloughed by his employer, the German Christian-streamlined Evangelical Lutheran State Church of Mecklenburg, after the Nazi government sued him in a political trial in Schwerin in June 1934.

The "Neueste Nachrichten aus dem Morgenland", the journal of Jerusalem's Association, complained about Jewish immigration to Palestine (1937) and Arab Nationalism (1939), which it regarded as being due to the infiltration by European decomposing ideologies.

After Moderow's return to Germany in 1937 the retired Oertzen served again as pastor in Jaffa until 1939. Jerusalem's Association in Germany experienced a growing hostility by anti-Semites to its name, referring to Jerusalem, and its journal, referring to the Levant. Thus on 27 February 1938 Jerusalem's Association adopted the name affix Jerusalemsverein/Versorgung deutscher evangelischer Gemeinden und Arabermission in Palästina (Jerusalem's Association/Maintenance of German Protestant congregations and missioning of Arabs in Palestine).

In July 1939 Oertzen left Jaffa for a summer holiday in Germany, but also to look after his salary, which had been withheld on a German account, for – in preparation of the war – the rationing office blocked most transfers abroad since early 1939. Jerusalem's Association used Haavara Ltd. for its transfers to Palestine between 1937 and 1939.

==== World War II and after ====
With Germany (September 1) and the Soviet Union (September 17) invading Poland in 1939, the Second World War started, followed by the British internment of most male Jaffa parishioners of German or other enemy nationality as enemy aliens. In May 1940 all remaining enemy aliens of Jaffa, Bir Salem, Sarona and Tel Aviv, not yet interned, such as Gentile Germans, Hungarians, and Italians, were interned in Wilhelma, which was converted into an internment camp. The remainder was evacuated to Cyprus in April 1948.

=== Relation to the Templers ===
The relations of the early Protestants of Jaffa were without major tensions. Peter Martin Metzler had sold other real estate and his hospital, which he had built up, to the Templers on 5 March 1869 under the proviso to further cooperate with Reformed (Calvinist) deaconesses from Riehen deaconesses' mother house and to provide charitable health care for all, who needed it The physician was Dr. Gottlob Sandel, father of the engineer Theodor Sandel. In 1882 the Württembergian royal court preacher Dr. Friedrich Braun, however, defamed Templers in his "Protestantismus und Sekten" (Protestantism and sects) as bearing "the character of the morbidly abnormal." When in March 1897 Pastor Schlaich had arrived in Jaffa, the Templers offered him their fellowship hall for his first accession preach to the Evangelical congregation, and Schlaich accepted However, in October the same year, travelling and fund-raising in Württemberg, Schlaich unveiled that his aim is proselytising among Muslims and Templers, who felt deeply insulted to be mentioned in the same breath with non-Christian Muslims. So the relations chilled down again.

In 1897 and 1898 Templers of Jaffa and Sarona intrigued with the Sublime Porte and the German Foreign Office against the plans to build a combined Evangelical school and community centre, financed by generous donations of Braun and others. So the laying of the cornerstone for the Evangelical community centre was delayed, for Templers argued the title to the construction site would be under dispute So William II and Auguste Victoria could not attend it.

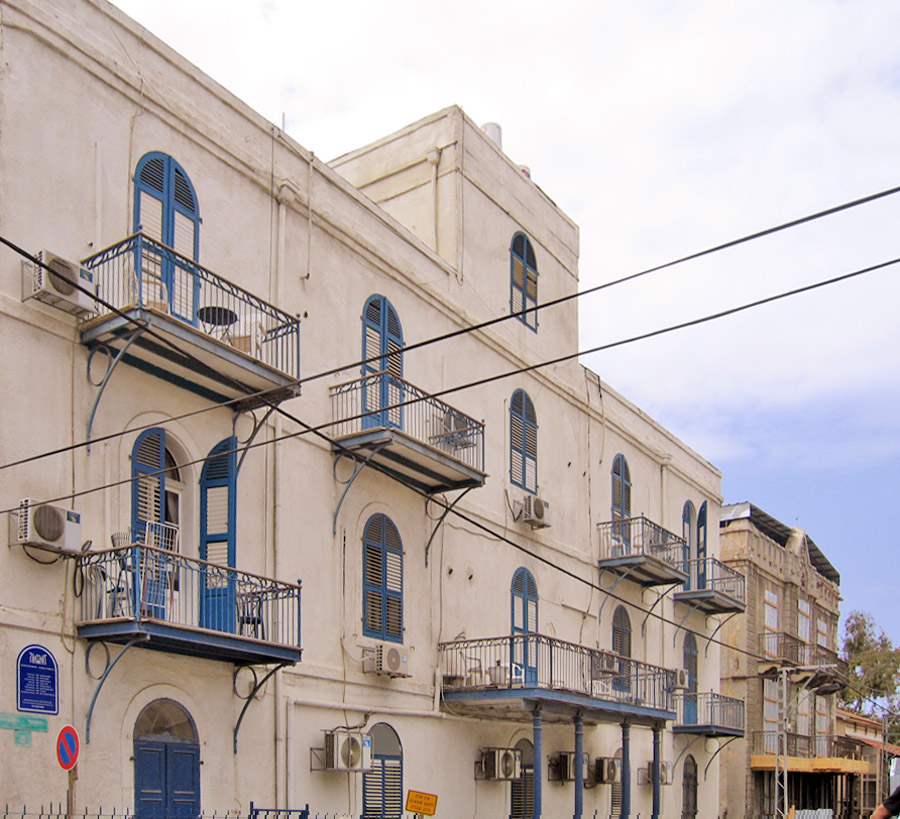
Ustinov's former Hôtel du Parc (left) and Hardegg's former Hotel Jerusalem (right), façades towards Rechov Auerbach (רחוב אוארבך)

German Emperor William II, his wife Auguste Victoria, protectress of Jerusalem's Association, and their entourage stayed in Jaffa on 27 October 1898. Their travel agency Thomas Cook accommodated the imperial guests in Ustinov's "Hôtel du Parc", the only establishment in Jaffa regarded suited for them, while the further entourage stayed in Hotel Jerusalem (then Seestraße, today's Rechov Auerbach #6; רחוב אוארבך) of the Templer Ernst Hardegg. Thus William II, as summus episcopus (Supreme governor of the Evangelical State Church in Prussia's older Provinces) kept the balance between Templers and Evangelical Protestants at his visit.

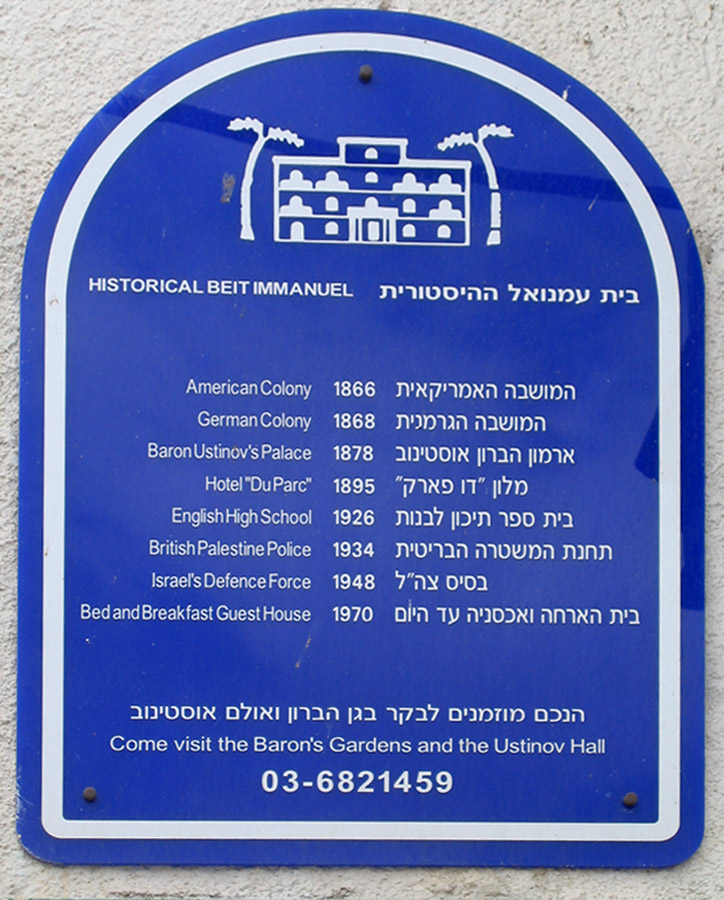
Explanatory plaque on former Hôtel du Parc

All German citizens hoped after the visit for an improvement of their treatment by the Ottoman authorities, but in vain, the tiny community of Germans in the Holy Land only played a marginal role in the German-Ottoman relationship, which was not to be obfuscated by quarrelling settlers in the Holy Land.

The hospital, founded by Metzler and run since 1869 by Templers and Protestant deaconesses, was financed by a health insurance, which provided for higher contributions by Protestants and lower ones for Templers, who considered themselves as the main providers of the hospital since its purchase in 1869. Generally the revenues of the health insurance also covered the cost caused by poor patients from the general Jaffa population, who were treated even though they could not pay for it. In 1901 the relations between Protestants and Templers had eased so far, that the Protestant contributions were lowered to 20 and 30 francs p.a., before both religious groups paid equal contributions as of 1906

Pastor Zeller, who officiated in Jaffa since 1906, took his efforts to reconcile both groups. After ten years of negotiating the unification of the Evangelical and the Templer school, long rejected by the Provost of Jerusalem and Jerusalem's Association, due to their prejudices against Templers as sectarians, an agreement was achieved. On 27 October 1913 the Evangelical and the Templer school merged into a common school in the new school building of the Templers, completed in October 1912, until its demolition located in today's Rechov Pines, opposite to #44 It remained an oecumenical school until its closure by the Britons in November 1917. Jerusalem's Association spent 10% of its budget for schools in the Holy Land.

With the philosophy of the Temple Society, to reconstruct the Holy Land in order to gather the people of God, fading in view of the resurrection of the Holy Land by Jewish settlement, the Templers' faith lost binding power for many of its members and especially many younger discovered Nazism as a non-denominational replacement of the vacuum. Thus most Nazis in the Holy Land were from Templer background. This led to a complete turnaround in the Evangelical-Templers' relationship, because before 1933 the Evangelical Protestants had strong mental and financial support by German Protestant church bodies, while Templers were somewhat orphaned. After 1933 Templers increasingly usurped positions with influential connections to Nazi party and Nazi government bodies in Germany, while the German Protestant church bodies as partners of the Evangelical congregations in the Holy Land lost government support by the struggle of the churches and by Hitler's and Alfred Rosenberg's general abandonment of Christianity, considered indissolubly Judaised with the Ten Commandments and the Old Testament. Cornelius Schwarz, a Templer from Jaffa, led the Palestinian faction (Landesgruppe) of the Nazi party, with him many young men gained influence over long established institutions as the Evangelical provostry and its congregations as well as the Temple Society itself. The German Foreign Office imposed on Gentile Germans of different denominational affiliations a stronger co-operation under influence of Palestinian Nazi officials of Temple background.

=== Congregational institutions ===
On 18 July 1898 Metzler, who then lived in Stuttgart, conveyed his last piece of real estate in Jaffa for the construction of an Evangelical church, community centre and pastor's apartment, to the congregation, while his friend and divorced son-in-law Ustinov rewarded Metzler with 10,000 francs two thirds of the site's estimated price In August 1898 Ernst August Voigt, architect of Haifa, handed in his plans for a combined church, community centre, school and pastor's apartment.

The belated firman, permitting the building, finally arrived on 27 October 1898, after attempts of Templers to baffle the planned constructions, however, too late for an imperial attendance in the laying of the cornerstone.

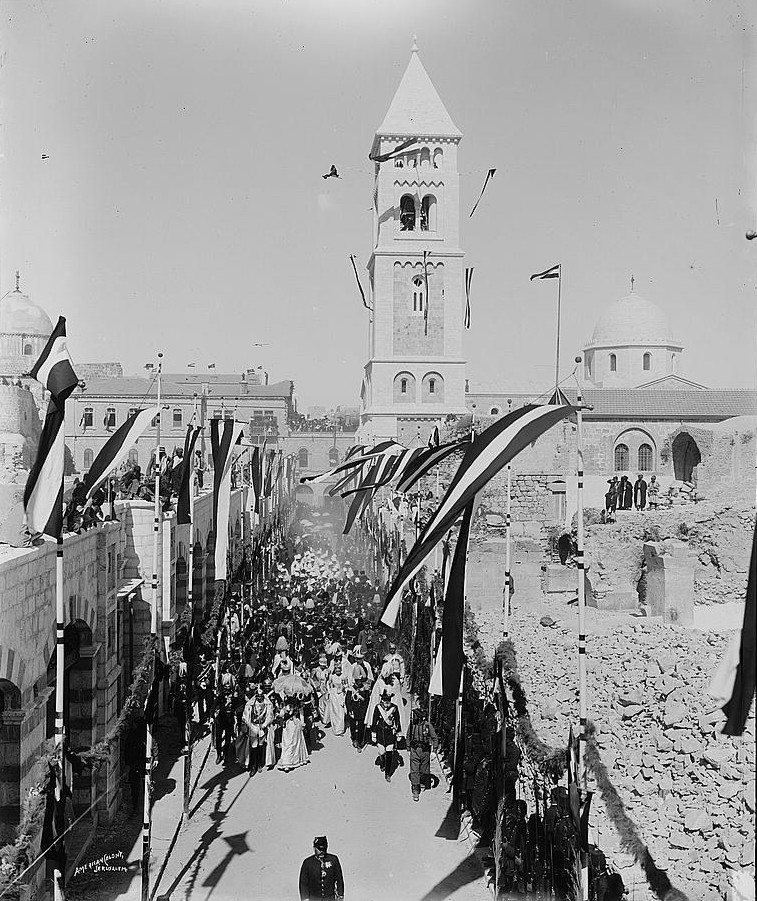
King William II of Prussia, then Supreme Governor of the Evangelical Church of Prussia's older Provinces, and Queen Auguste Victoria after the inauguration of the Evangelical Church of the Redeemer in Jerusalem (Reformation Day, 31 October 1898)

After Emperor William II's inauguration of the then Evangelical Church of the Redeemer in Jerusalem on Reformation Day, 31 October 1898, the bulk of the accompanying entourage was determined to return to Jaffa, to get back to their ship. However, a train accident on the Jaffa–Jerusalem railway, opened in 1892, interrupted their journey, so that they only arrived in Jaffa on November 2.

Thus the Protestant dignitaries among them participated in the laying of the cornerstone for the Evangelical church and community centre in Jaffa, among them Dr. Robert Bosse (*1832–1901*), Prussian minister of education, cult, culture and medicine, the executive board of Jerusalem's Association, D. Friedrich Wilhelm Barkhausen (*1831–1903*), president of the Evangelical Supreme Ecclesiastical Council and General Superintendents of different ecclesiastical provinces within the Evangelical State Church of Prussia's older Provinces, representatives of other German and Swiss Protestant church bodies (Braun for Württemberg), of the Lutheran Church of Norway and Church of Sweden as well as of other Protestant churches in Hungary, Italy, the Netherlands, and the US, altogether 45 women and men of the imperial delegation. From the local notables Christoph Hoffmann II (jun.), president of the Temple Society, and representatives of the Evangelical congregations in Bethlehem in Judea, Bir Salem, Haifa, and Jerusalem participated in the ceremony. Braun, court preacher of King William II of Württemberg, held the speech at the ceremony and donated himself 10,000 marks The actual cornerstone included the deed of foundation and seeds of grain and vegetables, symbolising the fertility of the Sharon plain.

The projected overall 30,000 marks were much too little, so some months later Jerusalem's Association withdrew from co-financing the project, it regarded to be nonserious. In 1899 Voigt declared the site to be too small for a community centre and a church, as was planned The congregation then spent with Braun's consent his donation of 10,000 marks for Heilpern's house (today's Rechov Beer-Hofmann #9), to become the school and rectory, for the latter of which it also serves today's congregation. However, then the German vice-consulate, still resided in that house and Consul Edmund Schmidt asked to be allowed to further stay there until the new, still-existing vice-consulate in today's Rechov Eilath # 59 would be completed. So the school stayed ad interim with Ustinov's "Hôtel du Parc". Metzler's former site in then Wilhelmstraße (today's Rechov Beer-Hofmann #15) was thus reserved for a future solitary church building.

In April 1900 Pastor Schlaich and his wife moved into Heilpern's house, as well as the school with its 30 pupils, among them Catholic and Jewish pupils, but no Templers, from Jaffa and neighbouring Neve Tzedek and Neve Shalom. In November 1917 the school had been closed by the Britons. All the property of the congregation, Jerusalem's Association and of parishioners of German and other enemy nationality was taken into public custodianship. With the establishment of a regular British administration in 1918 Edward Keith-Roach became the Public Custodian of Enemy Property in Palestine, who rented out the property and collected the rents, until the property was finally returned to its actual proprietors in 1925.

On 14 April 1918 John Mott and J. H. Oldham, two oecumenists, founded the Emergency Committee of Cooperating Missions, Mott becoming the president and Oldham the secretary. Mott and Oldham succeeded to get Art. 438 into the Treaty of Versailles, so that the property of German missions would be excepted from being expropriated for German reparations for World War I. Jerusalem's Association and the Evangelical Jerusalem Foundation had meanwhile appointed the Swedish Lutheran Archbishop Nathan Söderblom their speaker at the Britons.

In May 1919 Jerusalem's Association informed the Reich's commissioner on Germans as enemy nationals abroad, that its loss of property in the Holy Land amounted to 891,785 marks at its pre-war rate (about £44,589.25 or $212,329.76). The Treaty of Versailles, signed on 28 June 1919, finally became effective on 10 January 1920 and thus legalised the existing British custodianship of the property of the congregation, the parishioners and Jerusalem's Association. The schools of Jerusalem's Association were reopened under British government management in 1920. In April 1920 the Allies convened at the Conference of San Remo and agreed on the British rule in Palestine, followed by the official establishment of the civil administration on 1 July 1920. From that date on Keith-Roach transferred the collected rents for property in custodianship to the actual proprietors. The League of Nations legitimised this by granting a mandate to Britain in 1922 and Turkey, the Ottoman successor, finally legalised the British Mandate by the Treaty of Lausanne, signed on 24 July 1923 and becoming effective on 5 August 1925. Thus the public custodianship ended in the same year and the prior holders achieved the fully protected legal position as proprietors. Jerusalem's Association applied for registration as Palestinian legal entity, granted in 1928.

Jerusalem's Association resumed its own schools and its school in Jaffa, held in condominium with the Templers, however, Provost Rhein complained about the decline of pupils in the Evangelical schools, whose parents were German, Austrian or other German-speaking Jews, especially in the difficult years of 1931 and 1932.

Starting in 1933 the new German Nazi government tried to get the German schools in the Holy Land under its influence, using again the dependence of the school providers on transfers from Germany. Oertzen and Rhein fought the deconfessionalisation of the Evangelical schools. Provost Rhein succeeded to resist the merger of the remaining Evangelical schools with Templer schools until 1937, on which occasion they became paganised, teaching the pupils Nazi Weltanschauung. In order to regain influence on the curriculum, Rhein then tried to join the Palestinian section of the National Socialist Teachers League (NSLB), but Palestinian NSLB president Dr. Kurt Hegele refused Rhein's membership. So by 1938 all Gentile teachers of German nationality had joined the NSLB, except of Rhein and some further Evangelical missionary .

After the begin of the Second World War in September 1939 all property of the Jaffa congregation, of its parishioners of German or other enemy nationality and of Jerusalem's Association were submitted to the Custodian of Enemy Property, Keith-Roach again, and the schools were supervised by the Committee for Supervision of German Educational Institutions under the Anglican bishop of Jerusalem, George Francis Graham Brown. With the internment of all Jaffa parishioners of German or other enemy nationality in 1940 the premises and houses in Jaffa were confiscated by the Mandatory government. Later the Anglican Church's Ministry Among Jewish People used the Immanuel Church for its services until 1947. The State of Israel, with Jaffa belonging to its state territory, succeeded the mandatory government in this custodianship in May 1948, however, excluding the building of Immanuel Church proper, since the new state did not seize places of worship.

== Church building ==
=== History ===
After in 1899 the first construction works of a combined Evangelical church, community centre and school ended, with the cornerstone having been laid in November 1898, Jerusalem's Association returned as partner and financier of the church and commissioned Paul Ferdinand Groth (1859–1955), architect of Jerusalem's Evangelical Church of the Redeemer and renovator of All Saints' Church, Wittenberg, by the end of 1901 to design plans for the future solitary Immanuel Church.

Stuttgart's Court Preacher Braun started a fund-raising campaign, also attended by Grand Duchess Vera Constantinovna of Russia, the niece and adoptee of the late Württembergian Queen Olga and King Charles I, to collect the needed funds, with Braun and his wife themselves donating 25,000 marks. In 1902 the Ottoman authorities recognised the construction site in then Wilhelmstraße (today's Rechov Beer-Hofmann #15) as religious property, including its liberation from property tax .

After Jerusalem's Association threatened to choose another architect, if Groth would not downsize his plans to a less costly project, Groth provided plans for a cheaper church at the begin of 1903. Jerusalem's Association then commissioned the architect and Templer Benjamin Sandel (1877–1941), then leading the constructions of the Hagia Maria Sion Abbey in Jerusalem and son of the late Theodor Sandel, as supervisor, and the Templer Johannes Wennagel (1846–1927) from Sarona as building contractor, starting excavation on 11 May 1903, however, constructions progressed only slowly because Groth was late with sending the detailed plans, only completely arriving in February 1904.

Braun, the most prominent donor for the congregation and church, travelled on behalf of Jerusalem's Association from Stuttgart to Jaffa to attend the inauguration of Immanuel Church, scheduled for Pentecost 1904 (May 22). Unfortunately he contracted dysentery after his arrival and died hospitalised in Jerusalem on 31 May 1904. He was buried on the Anglo-Prussian simultaneous Anglican-Evangelical Cemetery on Mount Zion, close to Samuel Gobat's grave.

The inauguration of Immanuel Church was then delayed to Monday June 6, held as a sober ceremony and attended by Büge, participants from other Evangelical congregations, and Templers. A year later on June 6 Theodor Schneller celebrated a memorial service for Braun.

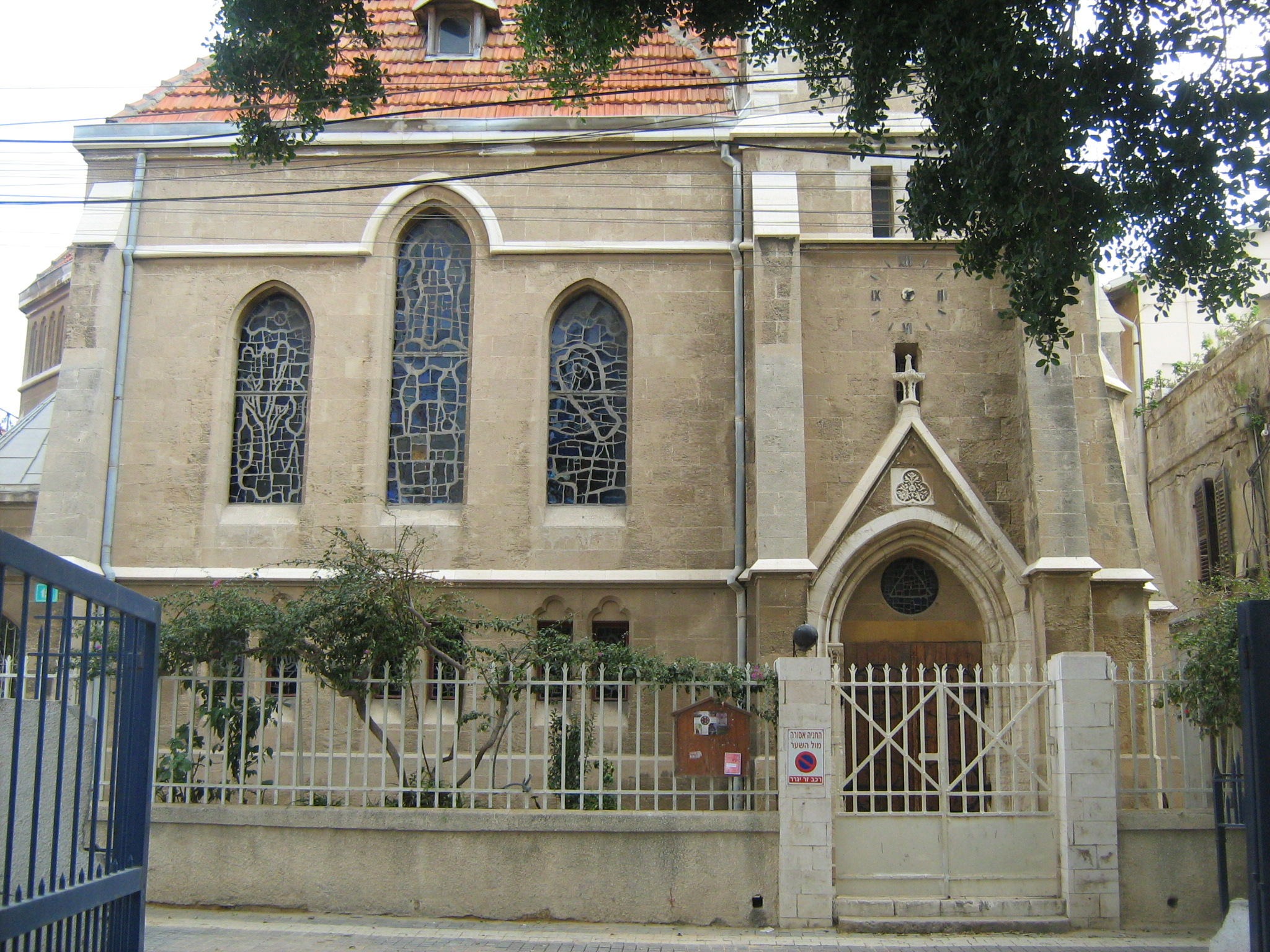
Northern façade of sandstone

=== Description ===
The walls are built from two kinds of natural stone, a yellowish-grey type of sandstone quarried close to Jaffa and a limestone, the so-called Meliki, from the mountains at Bir Nabala.

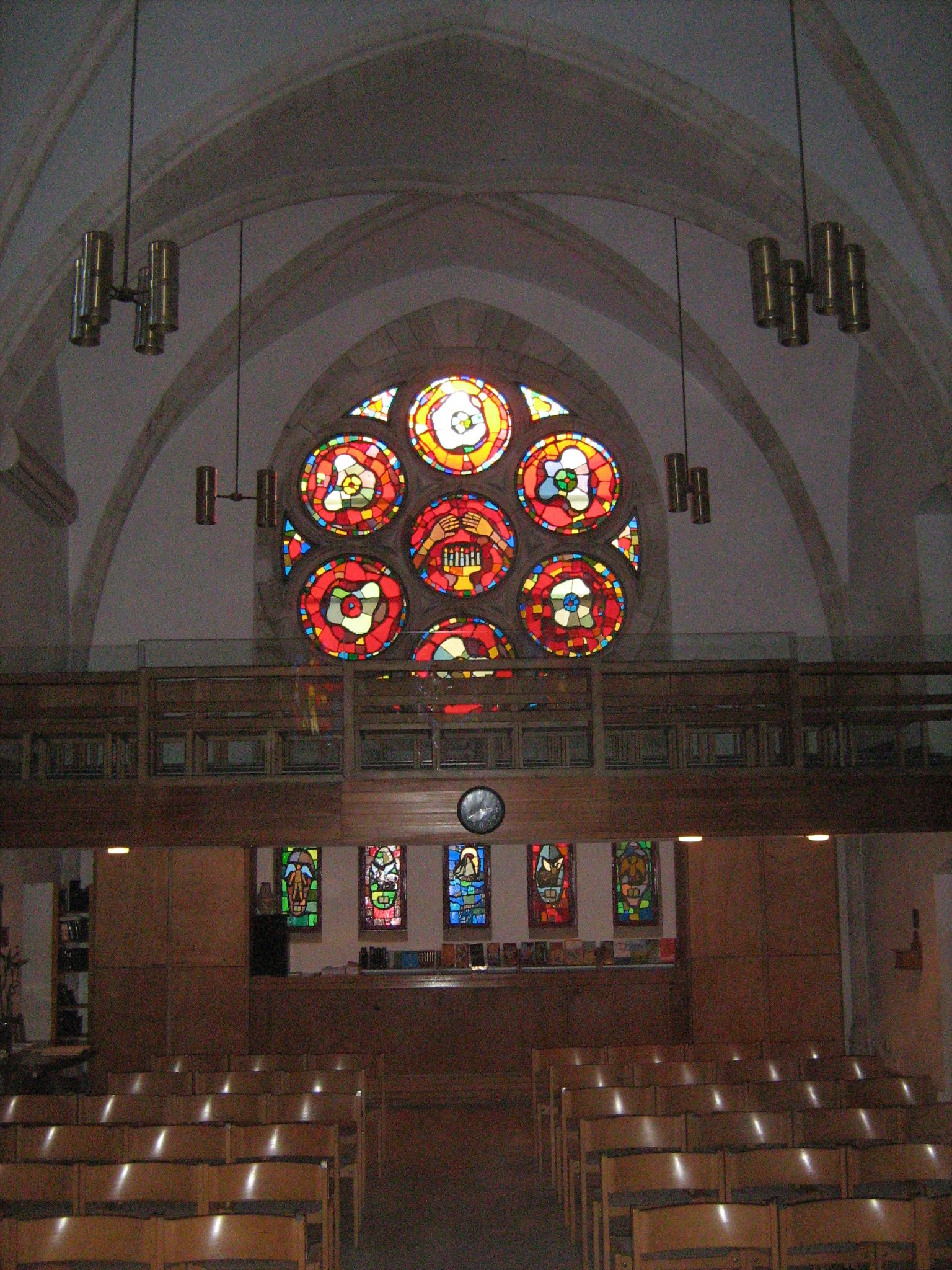
View through the main nave towards the western bay

The interior of the approximately oriented prayer hall is covered by cross vaults, on its northern side a pipe organ was installed on a loft.

The tower, housing a staircase, flanks the northern side aisle and the westernmost bay of the main nave.

==== Furnishings ====
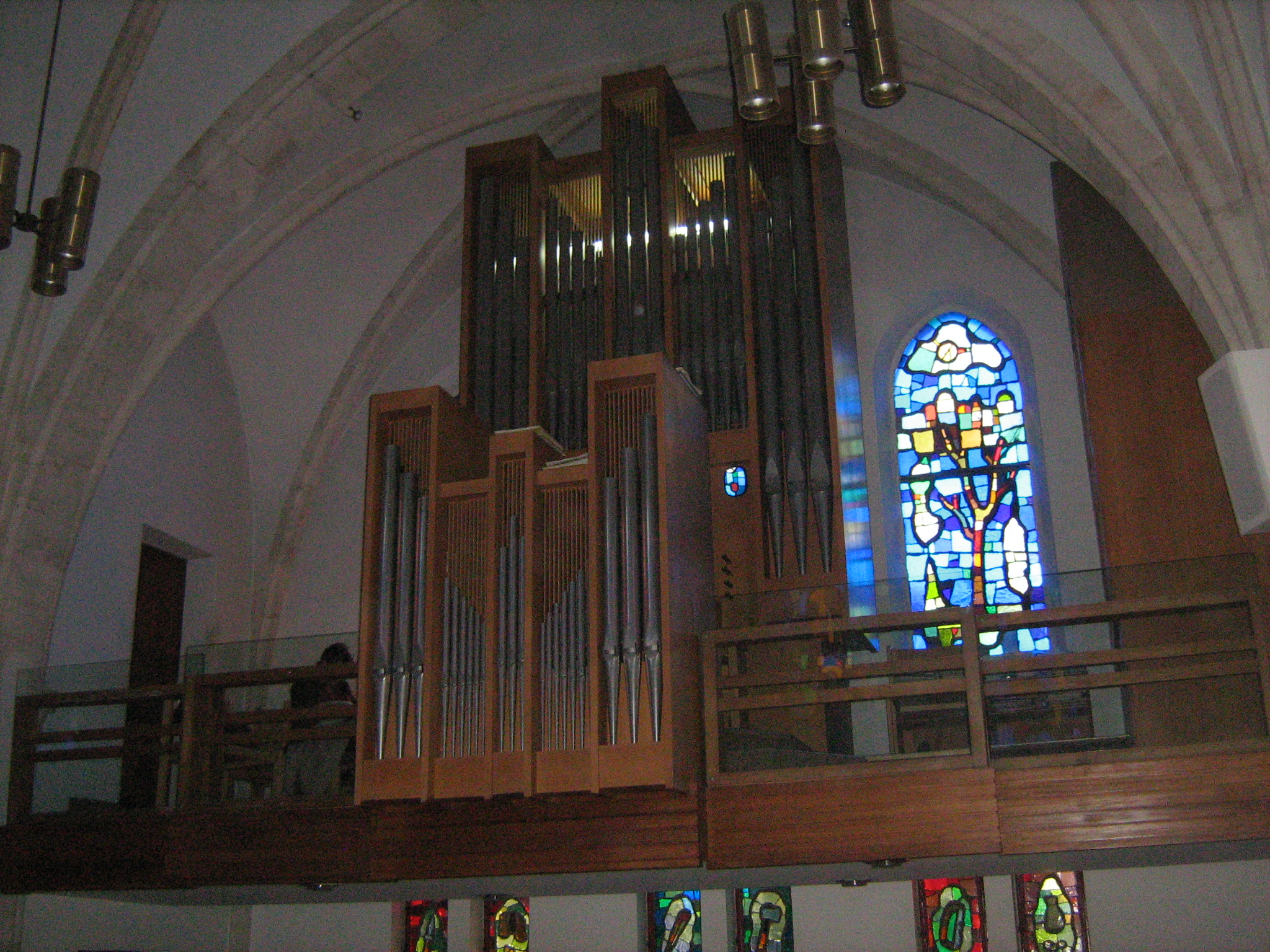
The new pipe organ of 1977 by Paul Ott

The furnishings were mostly imported from Germany. King William II of Württemberg and Queen Charlotte donated the church clock. In his function as summus episcopus of the Evangelical State Church of Prussia's older Provinces King William II of Prussia (also German Emperor) and his wife Auguste Victoria donated the main bell with the inscription "Gestiftet von S.M. d.K.u.K. Wilhelm II u. I.M. d.K.u.K. Auguste Victoria 1904/Zweifle nicht! Ap. Gesch. 10.20".

The Evangelischer Kirchenbauverein, with Auguste Victoria as its protectress, donated the small bells. She also donated the altar bible with her handwritten dedication: "Ja kommet her zu mir alle, die ihr mühselig und beladen seid; ich will Euch erquicken."

Miss Neef from Stuttgart financed the altar and the pulpit, while Ustinov granted the congregation a great crucifix from olive tree wood. The parishioners collected 4,050 francs for the pipe organ, produced by Walcker Orgelbau in Ludwigsburg. The stained glass windows were a product of Glasmalereianstalt Ferdinand Müller in Quedlinburg. In 1906 a plaque commemorating Friedrich Braun was fixed on the walls of Immanuel Church.

== Second congregation (1955–present) ==
On 29 August 1951 the State of Israel and the Lutheran World Federation, which took care of the formerly German Protestant missionary property in Israel, found an agreement on compensation for the lost missionary property and the future use of the actual places of worship.

== Notable parishioners ==
- 1892–1913?: Jona von Ustinov
- 1878–1913: Plato von Ustinov
