= Jerusalem Hotel =

Luxury hotel in Jaffa, now Tel Aviv, Israel

Coordinates: 32.0569°N 34.7625°E

The Hotel Jerusalem was the first ever luxury hotel outside of old Jaffa. It operated between the years 1870 and 1940 and had 57 rooms that occupied 1899 square meters. It was located on Rehov Auerbach #6 in the historic American Colony that soon became known also as the German Colony. The hotel is an important landmark in the development of Jaffa in the second half of the 19th century by being the first hotel outside of Jaffa's city walls. Currently the building is part of the top-end Drisco Hotel.

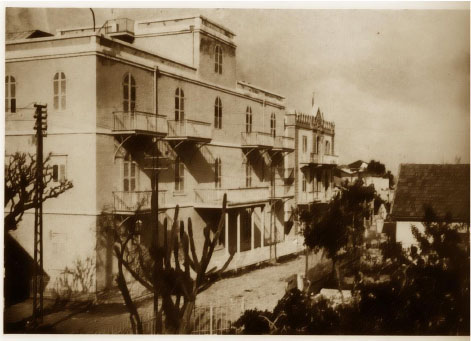
The old Jerusalem Hotel on the right, mostly hidden by the Hôtel du Parc

== History ==
=== American colony ===
In 1866, 156 Americans from Maine docked in Jaffa. They were Protestant Evangelicals (Christian Restorationism) who were primarily carpenters and farmers. They were led by George J. Adams, a charismatic reverend who had founded the Church of the Messiahs several years earlier in Maine. They believed that hard work and developing ties with the local Jews would hasten the Messiah's arrival.

The group purchased a small plot of land to the North of Jaffa and built several wooden structures with pre-fabricated pieces that they had brought with them from America.

Among this first group of American colonists there were two brothers, John and George Drisco who wanted to turn the colony into the first destination for the pilgrims on their way to Jerusalem.

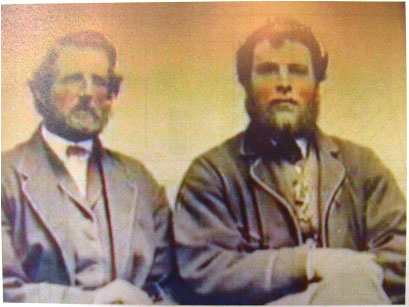
The Drisco Brothers

They started by buying a plot and then another from George J. Adams and begin building the hotel in early 1866 with the expectancy to be open for welcoming the first pilgrims of Easter 1867, however they only completed construction by April, thus missing the "pilgrim season" they had so heavily counted on. When they finally opened the hotel, they named it Le Grand Hotel, but their buoyancy is already starting to show cracks.

Disease, the climate, the insecure and arbitrary treatment by the Ottoman authorities, make many of the colonists remigrate to Maine.

=== German colony ===
As their finances dwindle and their spirit cracks, the Drisco brothers are forced to sell to a German missionary by the name of Peter Martin Metzler in order to afford travel fare back to Maine. Metzler bought the hotel and turned it into a mission for Swiss-German pilgrims.

On 5 March 1869 Metzler sold the hotel and all its property to the leaders of the Temple Society, Christoph Hoffmann and Georg David Hardegg, who had settled in Haifa a year earlier with the wish to redeem the Holy Land by an active and industrious lifestyle. They saw this as an opportunity to expand and establish a second colony close to Jaffa.

The Hotel Jerusalem was then owned and operated by Ernst David Hardegg, son of Georg David Hardegg. It flourished and served both pilgrims and dignitaries who came to visit Palestine. Mark Twain was a guest during his time as well as Thomas Cook, who reached a special arrangement with the hotel to house his guests and clients. During their journey to the Holy Land, German Emperor William II, his wife Augusta Victoria and their entourage stayed in Jaffa on 27 October 1898. Their travel agency Thomas Cook accommodated the imperial guests in the Hôtel du Parc, owned by the German Protestant Plato von Ustinov. The further imperial entourage stayed at the Jerusalem Hotel (then Seestraße, today's Auerbach Street, at number 6; רחוב אוארבך), owned by the Templer Ernst Hardegg, also US vice-consul seated in Jaffa between 1871 and 1909. Thus William II, as summus episcopus (Supreme governor of the Evangelical State Church in Prussia's older Provinces) kept the balance between Templers and Protestants at his visit, whose two denominations were quite in trouble with each other at that time.

=== Second World War ===
The British turn the hotel into their military headquarters as well as an adjacent police station. As the United Kingdom declares war on Nazi Germany, the British decide to intern the Gentile German community in Palestine, including the Germans, making up the majority among the Templers, many of whom sympathised with Nazis or even were actual active Nazi members.

=== Recent history ===
In the 2010s the building underwent heavy reconstruction, with the purpose of turning it by 2017 into a 50-room luxury suite hotel. The developers have named it the Drisco Hotel, after the two brothers who had raised the original building, John and George Drisco. The Drisco Hotel will also include the historic Norton House that is located on 4 Auerbach St.

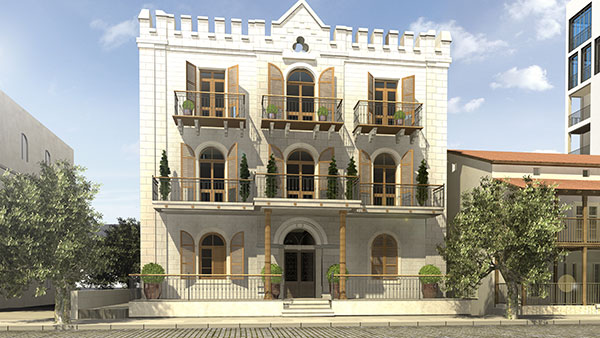
The new Drisco Hotel, comprising the old Jerusalem Hotel building (left) and the old Norton House (right)
