= Moritz Hall =

- Born: 14 March 1838; Cracow
- Died: 27 January 1914 (aged 75); Jaffa, Ottoman Empire
- Occupations: Missionary, metalworker, timber merchant, hotel proprietor
- Known for: Casting artillery for the Ethiopian Empire

Moritz Hall (14 March 1838 – 27 January 1914) was a Polish Christian missionary, metalworker, timber merchant, and hotel proprietor.

He was born in the then tripartitely controlled Free City of Cracow, in 1846 annexed to the Austrian Galicia and Lodomeria, and served briefly in the Russian Army before emigrating to Ethiopia. He worked with the London Society for Promoting Christianity Amongst the Jews in Ethiopia and the Chrischona Brethren and married Wälättä (Katarina) Iyäsus Zander, an Ethiopian-German. Whilst at the mission station at Gaffat he was compelled by the Ethiopian Emperor Tewodros II to cast artillery pieces for his army. Tewodros later turned against foreigners resident in Ethiopia and imprisoned Hall at his fortress in Mäqdäla. He was rescued by the British Expedition to Abyssinia and afterwards moved to the Middle East.

Hall settled in Jaffa where he became a mission station manager, timber merchant and hotel proprietor. Considered an elder among the German colony in the town, he was appointed an honorary dragoman at the German consulate. Hall was friends with the Nobel Prize-winning author Shmuel Yosef Agnon and was included as a character in his 1945 historical novel Temol Shilshom.

== Early life ==
Moritz Hall was born in Cracow, which was then in the Austrian section of partitioned Poland, on 14 March 1838. He was the son of Johann Jakob Salomon Hall and his wife, Sofia Rebeka Babette Hall, née Kunze, both of Jewish faith. He later lived in the Russian section of Poland and was conscripted into the Russian Army. Hall is said in some later reports to have deserted from the army. At this time he gained some skill in metal casting, either as a result of his military service or in the industries of Warsaw. Hall afterwards spent some time in Germany and England and converted from Judaism to Christianity.

== Ethiopia ==
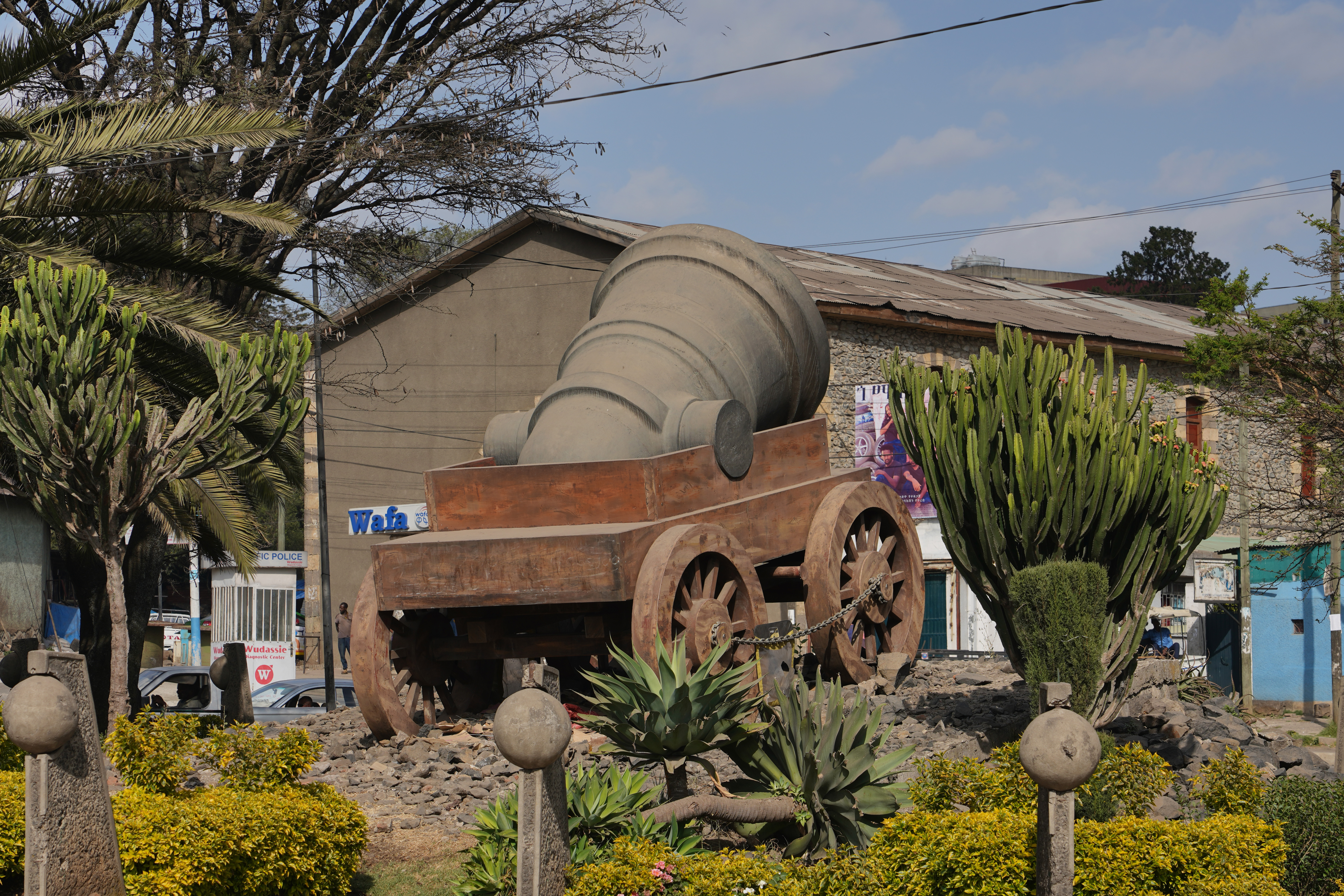
The Sebastopol mortar

Hall arrived in Ethiopia by the early 1860s, it is possible he arrived with no aim in mind other than to seek adventure but he also may have been appointed a servant to a missionary posted to the country or a travelling military officer. He soon became involved in German and British missionary activity, particularly with the London Society for Promoting Christianity Amongst the Jews in Ethiopia which sought converts from the Ethiopian Jews. He settled at the remote and poor mission station of Gaffat, to the east of Lake Tana. The mission was run by the Swiss-German Chrischona Brethren, a group of "artisan missionaries" who taught crafts and skills to locals as part of their attempt to attract converts. The station enjoyed the support of Ethiopian Emperor Tewodros II who sought to modernise his country.

Tewodros became increasingly unstable after the deaths of his wife and key English advisers. He ordered the Gaffat mission to produce artillery pieces for his army; the missionaries complained they had no knowledge of such matters but were compelled to start work. The mission station constructed a forge, with a dam and water wheel to drive the bellows. Hall's metal casting experience was put to good use and he made a mortar and ammunition, one of the first weapons produced at the station. By 1863 the forge had produced a number of cannon and further mortars, including "Sebastopol" which survives as a museum piece. The founding of the forge at Gaffat is sometimes considered the start of industrialisation in Ethiopia.

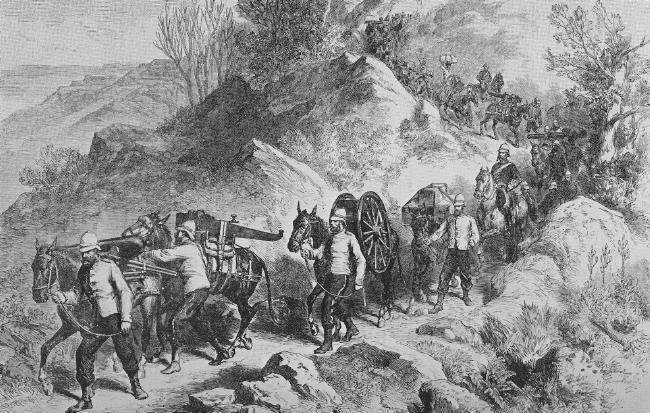
The departure of the British expedition

Hall married Wolete-Iyasus (Katarina) Zander, the 14-year-old daughter of an Ethiopian aristocrat mother and an Anhalt-born German artist father Eduard Zander (Ethiopian court portraitist), at Gaffat on 17 May 1863. In 1866 the couple had their first of thirteen children, Jakob Gottlieb Hall (1866-1919). By one report Hall had risen to a position of confidence with Tewodros and was considered his minister of war. However the emperor, increasingly dependent on alcohol, became increasingly erratic. Claiming to have received no reply to a letter he sent to the British Queen Victoria he imprisoned all English missionaries in the state, extending this to all foreigners by 1867. Hall and his family were imprisoned at the fortress of Mäqdäla. A British punitive expedition was sent in late 1867 and, in what became known as the Battle of Magdala, took the fortress by assault during which Tewedros took his own life. It was during his captivity at Mäqdäla that Hall, born to Jewish parents, converted to Christianity. Katarina gave birth to a daughter during the siege and she was named Magdalena after the fortress. Magdalena (1868-1945) went on to marry the Russian baron Plato von Ustinov and was the grandmother of British actor Peter Ustinov.

== Later life ==
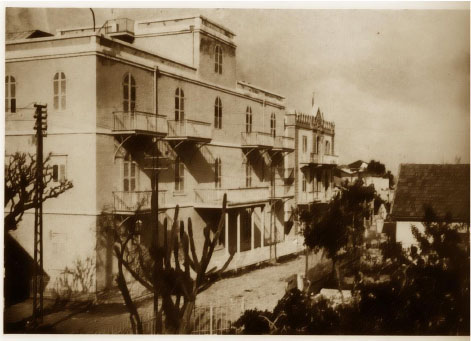
The Hôtel du Parc (left)

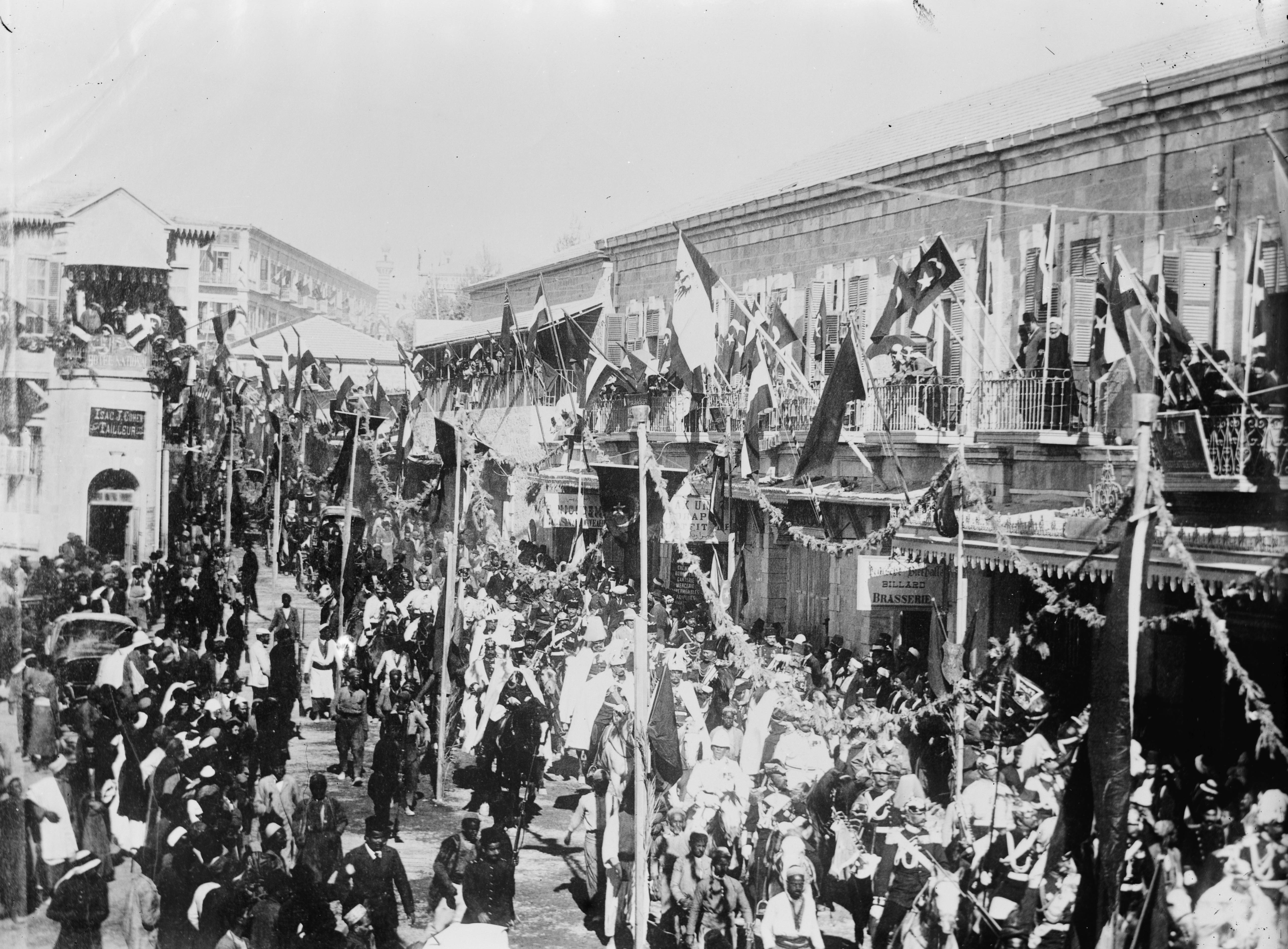
Wilhelm II's visit to Jaffa

Hall and his family left in company with the British expedition. They were offered passage to India but refused and travelled to Syria, and perhaps Baghdad, before settling at Jaffa in the Holy Land, which was then part of the Ottoman Empire. Despite his conversion Hall became involved with helping newly arrived Jews to settle in the town and is regarded as a founding father of the German colony there. Hall initially resided at a mission house owned by the London Society but was also closely involved with the Protestant Temple Society.

The Halls had eleven more children born during their time in the Near East: Daniel (1870–1943), Pauline (1872–1874), Christina (1874–1964), David (1876–1971), Friedrich Salomon (1879–1964), Joseph (1882–1964), Augusta (1884–1936), Vera (1886–1983), Immanuel (1888–1917), Katia (1891–1978) and Olga (1895–1911). In 1883, Hall was appointed to manage the London missionary society's colony at Artouf, west of Jerusalem, which was used to house potential Jewish converts to Christianity. He was dismissed in 1885 and returned to Jaffa. Considered an elder of the community there he also worked as a timber merchant and as proprietor of the Hôtel du Parc, where his sons also worked. Hall hosted Wilhelm II, German Emperor at the hotel during his 1898 visit to Jaffa.

Katarina returned to Ethiopia around 1902 with Jakob and was later joined there by Friedrich and David. She served as a lady-in-waiting to the Royal Court and became an influential friend of Empress Taytu Betul. She died in Ethiopia on 15 August 1932. Hall served as an honorary dragoman for the German consulate at Jaffa. He also became friends with the Nobel Prize-winning author Shmuel Yosef Agnon who included him as a character in his 1945 historical novel Temol Shilshom. Hall died of a stroke on 27 January 1914 and was buried at the Templar Cemetery in Jaffa. His remains were transferred to the Templar Cemetery in Jerusalem in 1952.
