= German Colony =

The term German Colony can refer to:

- German colonial empire, the former colonies of Germany
- German Colony, Jerusalem, a Templer settlement
- German Colony, Haifa, a Templer settlement
- German Samoa, a German protectorate from 1900 to 1920
- Sarona (colony), the German Templer settlement in Tel Aviv
- American–German Colony, a neighborhood in Tel Aviv
