= Plato von Ustinov =

Hotel owner in the Ottoman Empire

Plato Freiherr von Ustinov (Note: Also spelled Ustinow in German.) (born Platon Grigoryevich Ustinov; Russian: Платон Григорьевич Устинов; 1840–1918) was a Russian-born nobleman, naturalised German citizen, and one of the most prolific collectors of Palestinian antiquities. He lived off of his inherited wealth for most of his life and owned the Hôtel du Parc in Jaffa, Ottoman Empire, now part of Tel Aviv, Israel.

== Biography ==
=== Early life ===
Platon Grigoryevich Ustinov was born into wealth in the Russian Empire. He was the fourth child and second son of court councillor Grigori Mikhailovich Ustinov (1803–1860) and his wife, noblewoman Maria Ivanovna Panshina (1817–1846). Platon's father Grigori was the youngest son of Mikhail Adrianovich Ustinov (1755–1836), a millionaire merchant from Saratov, a major port on the Volga River. Grigori held a manor estate in Ustinovka, in today's Balashovsky District, Saratov Oblast.

Platon's uncle Mikhail Mikhailovich Ustinov (1800–1871) was Russian ambassador to Constantinople. Later, Platon's younger brother, Mikhail Grigoryevich Ustinov, would also follow a diplomatic path and become Russian consul in Hong Kong.

Ustinov went to a military academy in Saint Petersburg, in keeping with conservative aristocratic standards, and inherited the Ustinovka estate.

=== Travel to the Levant and friendship with the Metzlers (1860s) ===
From mid-1861 until early 1862, Ustinov stayed in a hostel in Jaffa. He travelled to the Levant after his doctors recommended its climate to heal a lung disease. On his way there, he met Peter Martin Metzler (1824–1907) and his wife Dorothea, née Bauer (1831–1870), a German couple working in Jaffa as Protestant missionaries for the St. Chrischona Pilgrim Mission, headquartered in Riehen, near Basel. He would stay in their pilgrim hostel, eventually becoming a financial partner in their enterprises, which included beyond the hostel a steam mill and trading in imported European merchandise.

Once his lung disease was completely cured, Ustinov returned to Ustinovka, but left the Metzlers a considerable sum of money to enable them to establish a missionary school and an infirmary in Jaffa. When he returned to Jaffa in September 1865, he was pleased with the Metzlers' investment of his funds. Indeed, in May 1862, the Metzlers opened a new infirmary staffed with two deaconesses from the Riehen deaconesses' mother house, related to the St. Chrischona Pilgrim missionaries.

In early 1869, Ustinov asked the Metzlers to join him in Ustinovka, hoping to draw on their management expertise. Metzler then sold much of his real estate on 5 March 1869 to the Temple Society, a religious group seeking a new home in the Holy Land. The Templers also continued to run the infirmary according to the charitable principles of the Metzlers and Ustinov. Dorothea Metzler died in Ustinovka after a difficult childbirth. While she was on her deathbed, Ustinov promised her that he would marry her daughter Marie, a promise he kept.

=== Protestant conversion and German naturalisation (1875–1876) ===
In 1875, Ustinov, a baptised Russian Orthodox, decided to convert to Lutheran Protestantism. Being a Russian aristocrat, his conversion would mean losing his estates and status, as all the tsar's Orthodox subjects were forbidden to convert. Ustinov was exiled to Germany in 1875 and sold his estates to another aristocrat in 1876. This is when began his financial involvement with members of the German Templer Society in Jaffa.

Queen Olga of Württemberg, herself Russian Orthodox, and sister of the then tsar of Russia, Alexander II, arranged for Ustinov to be naturalised in the Kingdom of Württemberg and become a German citizen. His status was confirmed as a Württembergian rank, and he became Freiherr (Baron) von Ustinow.

=== First marriage (1876–1889) ===
Ustinov married Marie Metzler, as promised, in Korntal, Württemberg, on 4 October 1876. They lived in Württemberg for two years before returning to Jaffa and settling there permanently. They bought a mansion in the Colony of the Templers which would become the Hôtel du Parc. Ustinov joined the German Society for the Exploration of Palestine in 1879. However, the marriage was very unhappy and the couple divorced in 1888, with costly divorce proceedings between 1881 and 1889.

=== Second marriage (1889–1918) ===
On 12 January 1889, Ustinov, then aged 48, married the 20-year-old Magdalena Hall (1868–1945), with whom he would have five children. Their daughter-in-law Nadia Benois, who married their eldest son Jona, described Ustinov as removed from his wife's social life: "When his wife received guests, he retired to his rooms and did not appear again until they had departed."

Magdalena had been born in Mäqdäla in central Ethiopia on 13 April 1868, the day when British forces took the fortress by storm at the Battle of Magdala, liberating her family and others from captivity. Her family had later moved to Jaffa.

Magdalena's family background was very multicultural. Her father was Moritz Hall (1838–1914), a Jew from Kraków and cannon-caster of Negus (King) Tewodros II of Ethiopia. Hall was converted to Protestantism by missionaries of the St. Chrischona Pilgrim Mission, the same group as the Metzlers with whom Ustinov had been friends. Magdalena's mother was the Ethiopian court-lady Wälättä Iyäsus (1850–1932), also known as Katharina (or Katherine) Hall. She would become adviser to Empress Taytu and lobby Ustinov, her son-in-law, to acquire property in Jerusalem.

The couple's eldest child, Jona von Ustinov (1892–1962), became a journalist and diplomat who worked for MI5 during the time of the Nazi regime and fathered the British actor Sir Peter Ustinov. Followed Peter (1895–1917), or Petja, the only child born outside of Jaffa. Instead, he was born in Bad Tölz, Bavaria and was killed in action in Hollebeke during the First World War, in which he served in the German army with his older brother. The three youngest moved to the Americas: Plato(n) (1903–1990), a celebrated British Columbian artist, Tabitha (1900–1991), who died in Pasadena, California, and Gregory, or Grisha, Tich (1907-1990), who died in Buenos Aires.

=== End of life back in Europe (1913–1918) ===
By 1913, Ustinov had run out of money. Facing personal bankruptcy just as Europe and the Middle East were set to explode into war, Ustinov had no other choice but to sell his properties in Jaffa and Jerusalem as well as the collection of Greek, Roman and Egyptian antiquities he had amassed. He first went to London before returning to Russia via Stockholm. Indeed, he was granted special permission to go to Saint Petersburg by Tsar Nicholas II.

== Intellectual pursuits ==
Living off of his inherited wealth, Ustinov had ample time for his intellectual pursuits. He had become an expert in ancient languages, such as Greek, Latin, Hebrew, but also Amharic, a Semitic language which was and still is the official working language of Ethiopia.

Daughter-in-law Nadia Benois, who married Ustinov's eldest son Jona, described him as removed from his family's life: "He led his own life, pursuing his own interests: reading, studying, arranging and rearranging his archaeological collection." His intellectual pursuits were most important to him: "The only people he liked to see were the Benedictine priests and such like, who were scholars of antiquity and with whom he could have long and serious talks on his favourite subjects."

=== Antiquities collection ===
As many wealthy Europeans living in Palestine in the mid-nineteenth century, Ustinov was a major collector of Greek, Roman and Egyptian antiquities. He realised that he would have to sell them in 1913 as he had run out of money. His collection was stored in crates between 1913 and 1917 as he was trying to find a buyer. He first approached the British Museum, then potential buyers in Paris and Berlin, but had no luck.

Ustinov did manage to sell his collection while he was travelling from Stockholm to Saint Petersburg. It ended up at the University of Oslo, Norway. Theologian Johannes Pedersen wrote a 1928 book about the collection, Inscriptiones Semiticae collectionis Ustinowianae. He was followed by Ilona Skupinska-Løvset in 1976 with her book The Ustinov Collection: The Palestinian Pottery. More recently, Randi Frellumstad concentrated his 2007 Master's thesis on the glass contained in the collection.

== Hôtel du Parc in Jaffa ==
The mansion that became the Hôtel du Parc (Park Hotel) was originally built for George Adams, the leader of a schismatic Latter Day Saint sect who led an ill-fated effort to establish a colony of Americans in Palestine. It was situated between today's Rechov Eilat and Rechov haRabbi mi-Bacherach in Tel Aviv-Yafo. The settlement originally was named Amelican in Arabic and Adams City in English, but since it was taken over by German Templers, the neighbourhood is now called American–German Colony.

=== History of the American-German Colony ===
Ustinov's friends the Metzlers treated at their infirmary many sick American colonists who had arrived with George Adams and Abraham McKenzie from Maine on 22 September 1866. The colonists built their wooden houses from prefabricated pieces, which they brought from abroad. However, many of them contracted cholera, and about a third of them died. Many returned to Maine to escape disease, climate, and arbitrary treatment by the Ottoman authorities.

Adams withheld the colonists' money that they had given to him as a common fund before they had left America, so Metzler bought the land of five colonists, providing them with funds for their return to Maine. Most settlers did not return to America until 1867. Metzler later resold the mansion that would become the Hôtel du Parc to the London Society for Promoting Christianity Amongst the Jews, now known as the Church's Ministry Among Jewish People (CMJ).

In 1869, newly arriving settlers from the Kingdom of Württemberg led by Georg David Hardegg (1812–1879) and Christoph Hoffmann (1815-1885), members of the Temple Society, replaced them.

=== History of the hotel ===
Ustinov employed Bekhōr Nissīm ʾElhādīf, an alumnus of the Miqveh Yisra'el agricultural school. ʾElhādīf (1857–1913) bought exotic plants and trees from all over the world in order to develop the garden of Ustinov's hotel into a botanical park.

German Emperor William II, his wife Auguste Victoria, and their closest entourage stayed at the Hôtel du Parc on their visit to Jaffa on 27 October 1898, as indicated on a French-language postcard of the time. Their travel agency, Thomas Cook & Son, chose it because they considered it the only establishment in Jaffa suitable for them.

=== Venue for Evangelical services (1889-1897) ===
Ustinov joined the Evangelical congregation of Jaffa and offered it the hall of his Hôtel du Parc in Jaffa as a venue for services from 1889 to 1897. In 1889, it consisted of former Templers, Protestant German and Swiss expatriates, and proselytes gained earlier by the Metzlers' missionary efforts. Johann Georg Kappus Sr. (1826–1905) became the first chairman of the congregation, later followed by his son Johann Georg Kappus Jr. (1855–1928). When Jaffa's first pastor arrived nearly a decade later on 10 March 1897 from Korntal, where Ustinov had been married the first time, he accommodated Albert Eugen Schlaich and his wife Luise at the Hôtel du Parc until they could find an apartment of their own.

On 18 July 1898, Peter Metzler, who then lived in Stuttgart, conveyed his last piece of real estate in Jaffa for the construction of a church to the Evangelical congregation, for which Ustinov paid 10,000 francs, two-thirds of the site's estimated value. When the Evangelical Immanuel Church of Jaffa was finally built and furnished, Ustinov gave it a large crucifix of olive wood.

=== Heritage Centre Beit Immanuel ===
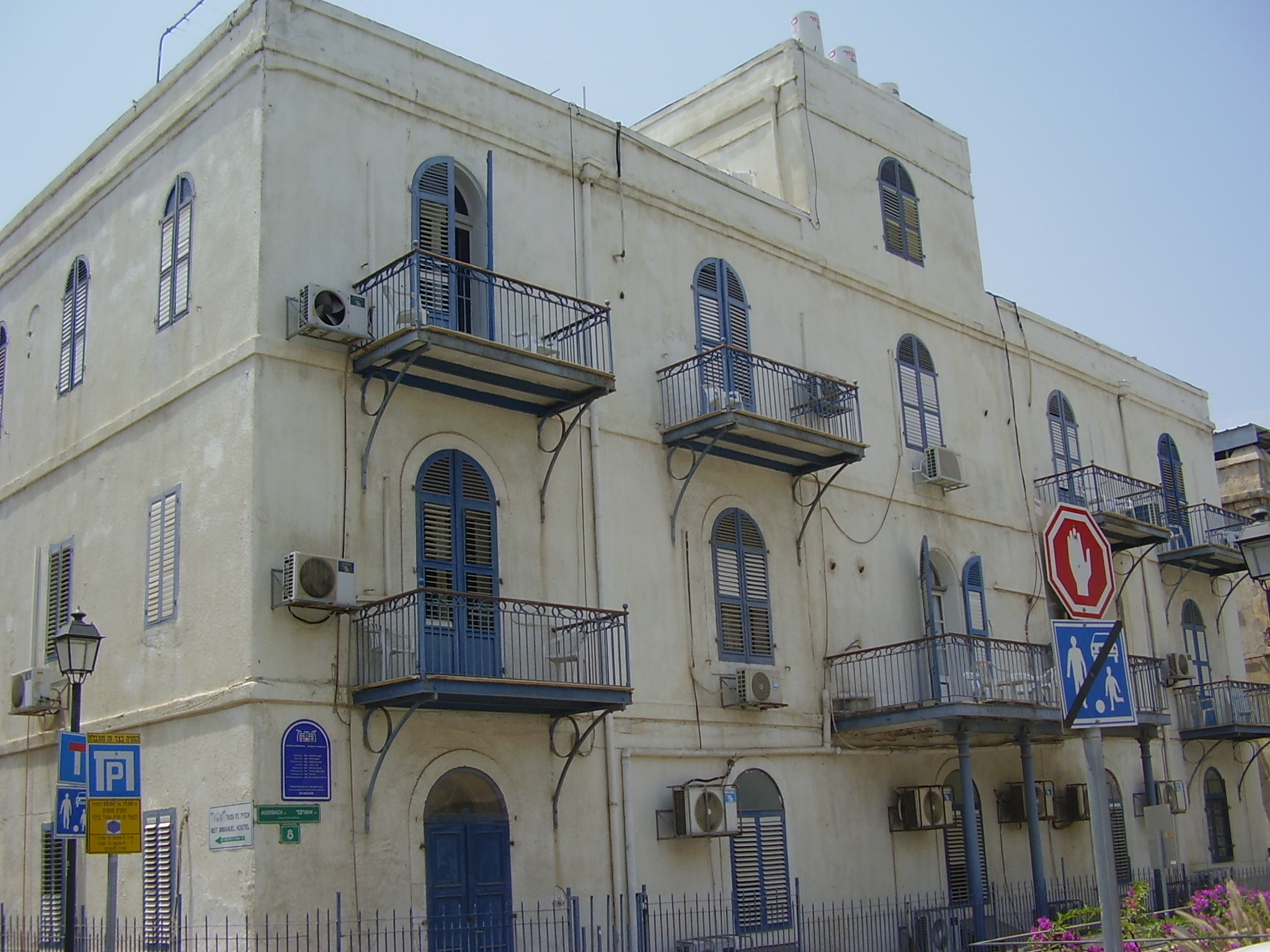
Beit Immanuel

After the end of the British public custodianship of enemy property in Palestine in 1925, Magdalena von Ustinov sold the former mansion in Rechov Auerbach No. 8 to the Church's Ministry Among Jewish People (CMJ) in 1926. It is now used as a place of worship, guest house, and heritage centre, called Beit Immanuel (Immanuel House).

== Ethiopian consulate in Jerusalem ==
Wälättä Iyäsus, the mother of Ustinov's second wife, was a powerful court-lady in Ethiopia like her own mother, the court-lady Ǝsetä-Wärq (b. 1820, potentially in the Ethiopian calendar, which would mean 1827 in the Gregorian calendar), also transliterated as Assete Worq. Her grandfather through her maternal grandmother was an Ethiopian general named Johannes Maschado, a name which could also have been transliterated into Makado, Mekado or Meqado. However, Wälättä Iyäsus was German through her father, painter Eduard Zander (1813–1868).

In 1902, Wälättä Iyäsus had returned to Ethiopia without her husband, Moritz Hall, and was adviser to the Ethiopian Empress Taytu. The latter tasked her with persuading her son-in-law, Ustinov, to acquire property near the Ethiopian Church in Jerusalem. The land was purchased in 1910, and construction of a large building began even if Ustinov and his family left Palestine in 1913 for Russia. When he died in 1918, his widow Magdalena, who went on to live in England and later in Canada, inherited the land in Jerusalem and the partially completed building on it.

During a trip to Jerusalem in 1924, Magdalena sold the property to the then-current Empress of Ethiopia, Zewditu, who was also visiting. Zewditu continued the construction on Ustinov's foundations, and it became the Ethiopian consulate, which still exists today.

== Bibliography ==
- Benois Ustinov, Nadia (1973). Klop and the Ustinov Family. New York City: Third Press. ISBN 0893881082.
- Day, Peter (2015). The Bedbug, Klop Ustinov: Britain's Most Ingenious Spy. Hull: Biteback Publishing. ISBN 9781849549462.
- Eisler, Jakob (1997). Der deutsche Beitrag zum Aufstieg Jaffas 1850–1914: Zur Geschichte Palästinas im 19. Jahrhundert. Abhandlungen des Deutschen Palästina-Vereins (in German). Vol. 22. Wiesbaden: Harrassowitz. ISBN 3-447-03928-0.
- Eisler, Jakob (1999). Peter Martin Metzler (1824–1907): Ein christlicher Missionar im Heiligen Land. Abhandlungen des Gottlieb-Schumacher-Instituts zur Erforschung des christlichen Beitrags zum Wiederaufbau Palästinas im 19. Jahrhundert (in German). Vol. 2. Universität Haifa. ISBN 965-7109-03-5.
- Perry, Yaron (2003). British Mission to the Jews in Nineteenth-Century Palestine. London: Frank Cass Publishers. ISBN 0-7146-8385-X.
- Shay, Oded, "Collectors and collections in Palestine at the end of the Othman era" (PDF), Le Muséon, vol. 122, no. 3–4, pp. 449–471.
- Vogel, Lester I. (1993). To See A Promised Land: Americans and the Holy Land in the Nineteenth Century. Penn State University Press. ISBN 0-271-00884-9.

== Further reading about his collection ==
- Pedersen, Johannes (1928). Inscriptiones semiticae collectionis ustinowianae. Symbolae Osloenses (in German). Oslo: Some et Sociorum.
- Skupinska-Løvset, Ilona (1976). The Ustinov Collection: The Palestinian Pottery. New York City: Grosset & Dunlap. ISBN 9788200015642.
- Frellumstad, Randi (2007). Glass in the Ustinow collection - objects without context? (Master's thesis). Universitetet i Oslo.
