= Johannes Pedersen (theologian) =

Johannes Peder Ejler Pedersen (7 November 1883 – 22 December 1977) was a Danish Old Testament scholar and Semitic philologist.

== Life ==
Pedersen was born at Illebølle in Langeland Municipality, Denmark. For his higher education, Pedersen entered Sorø Academy, a school with a history going back to 1140. His study of theology under F. C. Krarups, a priest/professor at Sorø, led to Pedersen's study of the Old Testament. After he graduated from Sorø Academy in 1902, Pedersen began study of Semitic languages under Professor Frants Buhl at the University of Copenhagen. In 1906 he obtained the university's gold medal, and in 1908 he took a divinity degree.

Pedersen continued his Semitic studies abroad under Heinrich Zimmern, August Fischer, Christiaan Snouck Hurgronje, and Ignaz Goldziher from 1909 to 1912. During this period, he began publishing his many works by co-authoring Bibelbog for Skole og Hjem (Biblebook for School and Home) in 1909.

From 1916 to 1922, Pedersen was a docent in Old Testament in the University of Copenhagen theological faculty. He became professor of Semitic-Oriental philology in 1922. Pedersen joined the Carlsberg Foundation 1926 and in 1933 became its chairman. He retired from his professorship in 1950 and from the Carlsberg Foundation in 1955.

Pedersen received several honorary doctorates and was a member of many learned societies abroad. He died in Copenhagen and was buried at Frederiksberg Ældre Kirkegård.

== Beliefs ==
Pedersen believed that "objective thought, that is to say, inactive, disinterested thought" does not exist in most instances. Thus, he was committed to the assumption that the full social context is necessary to understanding written texts. Pedersen exhibited an “exceptional ability to enter into the spirit of the ancient Oriental trains of thought,” as demonstrated in his primary work, Israel: Its Life and Culture, in four volumes (1920–34; Eng. trans. 1926–40).

In Israel, Pedersen pointed out that in the book of Genesis a soul is a person, not some invisible something inside a person. Consistently, passage after passage in Genesis, this is shown to be the case.

In Pedersen's words, “the soul [is] not part of man, but man as a totality with a peculiar stamp.” A man [soul] is “stamped by the special conditions under which he lives.” In summary, “the soul is thus an entirety with a definite stamp, and this stamp is transmuted into a definite will.” A man's “will is the whole tendency of the soul [the man].”

Pedersen's understanding of Bible regarding the “soul” and referring to “man as a totality” helped many notable students write their papers. One was Peter Atkinson, who went on to become the renowned theologian of his day.

== Works and articles ==
- Israel I: Sjaeleliv og Samfundsliv (Copenhagen: 1920).
- Israel II: Sjaeleliv og Samfundsliv (Copenhagen: 1920).
- Israel III: Hellighed og Guddommelighed (Copenhagen: 1934).
- Israel IV: Hellighed og Guddommelighed (Copenhagen: 1934).
- Israel, Its Life and Culture I (London-Copenhagen: 1926) (= South Florida Studies in the History of Judaism 28), Atlanta 1991 [this is the English translation of the first two volumes of Israel].
- Israel, Its Life and Culture II (London: 1940) (= South Florida Studies in the History of Judaism 29), Atlanta 1991 [the English translation of the second two volumes of Israel].
- 'Die Auffassung vom Alten Testament', Zeitschrift für die Alttestamentliche Wissenschaft Band (Vol.) 49 (Giessen 1931) pp. 161-181.
- Hebræisk Grammatik (København [Copenhagen]: 1926).
- Islams kultur (Stockholm: 1928).
- Inscriptiones semiticae (Oslo: 1928), from the Ustinow collection.
- 'Passahfest und Passahlegende', Zeitschrift für die Alttestamentliche Wissenschaft Band (Vol.) 52 (Giessen: 1934) pp. 161-175.
- Israel, its Life and Culture III - IV (London-Copenhagen: 1940) [this is the English translation of volumes III and IV of Israel].
- 'Canaanite and Israelite Cultus', Acta Orientalia Vol. XVIII (Leiden: 1940), pp. 1ff.
- Israelite Religionhistorie (Editor) (Copenhagen: 1948).
- 'The Role Played by Inspired Persons Among the Israelites and the Arabs', Studies in Prophecy (Robinson Festscrift), editor H. H. Rowley (Edinburgh: 1950).
- Muhammedansk Mystik, by Johannes Pedersen. (København [Copenhagen]: 1952).
- The Arabic Book, Translated by Geoffrey French (Princeton: Princeton University Press, 1984).
