= American–German Colony =

Residential area of Tel Aviv, Israel

Coordinates: 32°3′23.89″N 34°45′46.09″E

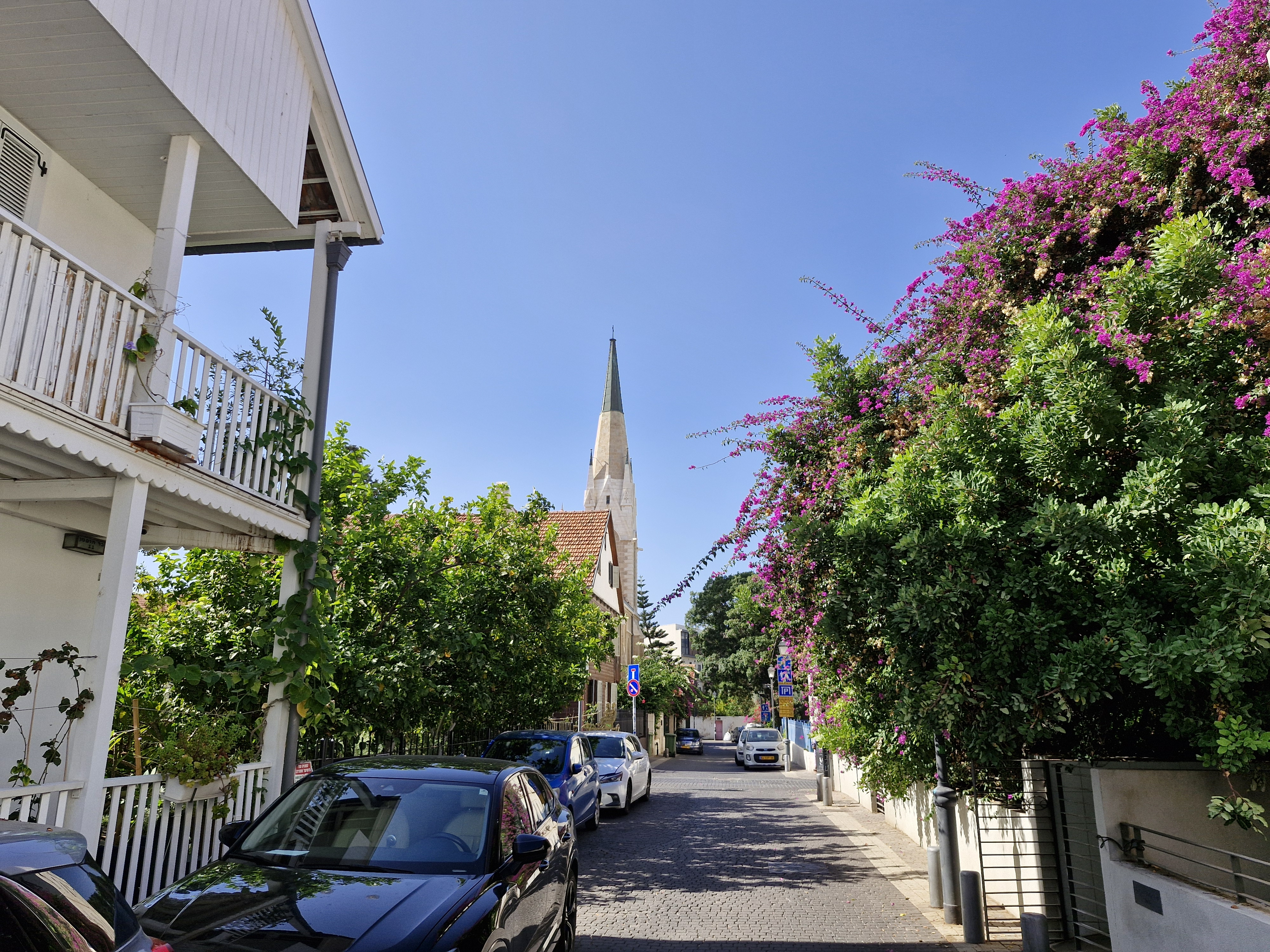
The American and Templar colony in Tel Aviv

The American–German Colony (Hebrew: המושבה האמריקאית–גרמנית, HaMoshava HaAmerika'it–Germanit) is a residential neighborhood in the southern part of Tel Aviv, Israel. It is located between Eilat Street and HaRabbi MiBacherach Street and adjoins Neve Tzedek. It was originally established as an American colony, but when that failed, it was resettled and became a German Templer colony, which in time evolved into a mixed German Protestant colony.

== History ==
The American–German Colony was founded in the 19th century by the American Protestant, Christian Restorationism movement, led by George J. Adams and Abraham McKenzie. They and more colonists from Maine had arrived on 22 September 1866 in Jaffa. They founded the American colony, named Adams City. They erected their wooden houses from prefabricated pieces, which they had brought with them. However, diseases, the climate, and their treatment by the Ottoman authorities, made many colonists willing to remigrate to Maine.

In 1867 and 1868, the German Peter Martin Metzler, then leading a Protestant mission in Jaffa for the Swiss St. Chrischona Pilgrims Mission, helped the American colonists to sell their real estate, also buying himself much of it. On 5 March 1869 Metzler sold many of the houses on to newly arriving settlers from Württemberg. In 1861 these settlers, led by Georg David Hardegg (*1812–1879*) and Christoph Hoffmann had founded their own Christian denomination, the Temple Society. According to their faith, the Templers wished to redeem the Holy Land by living in it in an actively industrious lifestyle, which the Templers saw as a way of symbolic reestablishing the Temple in Jerusalem.

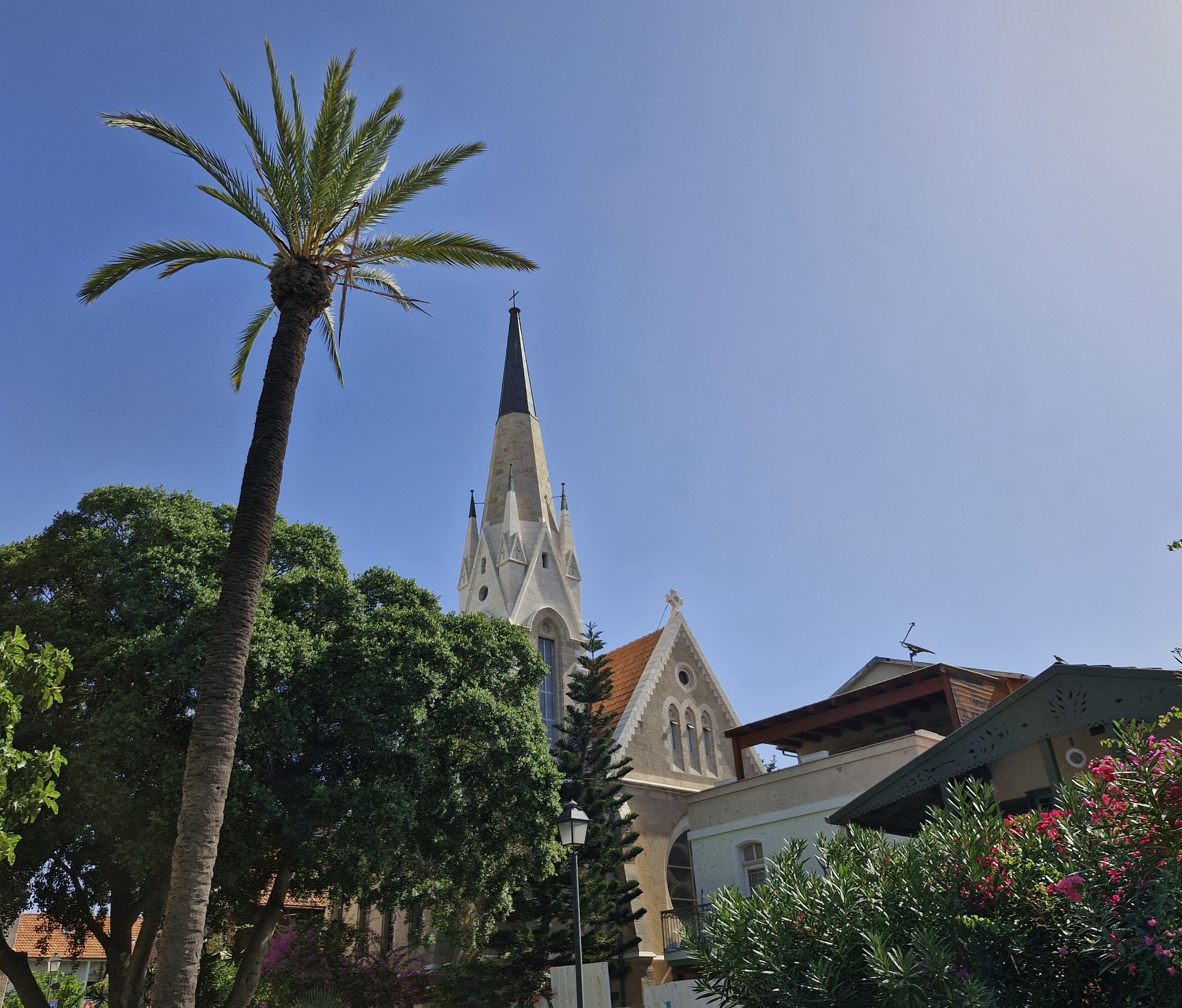
Immanuel Church, in the American Colony

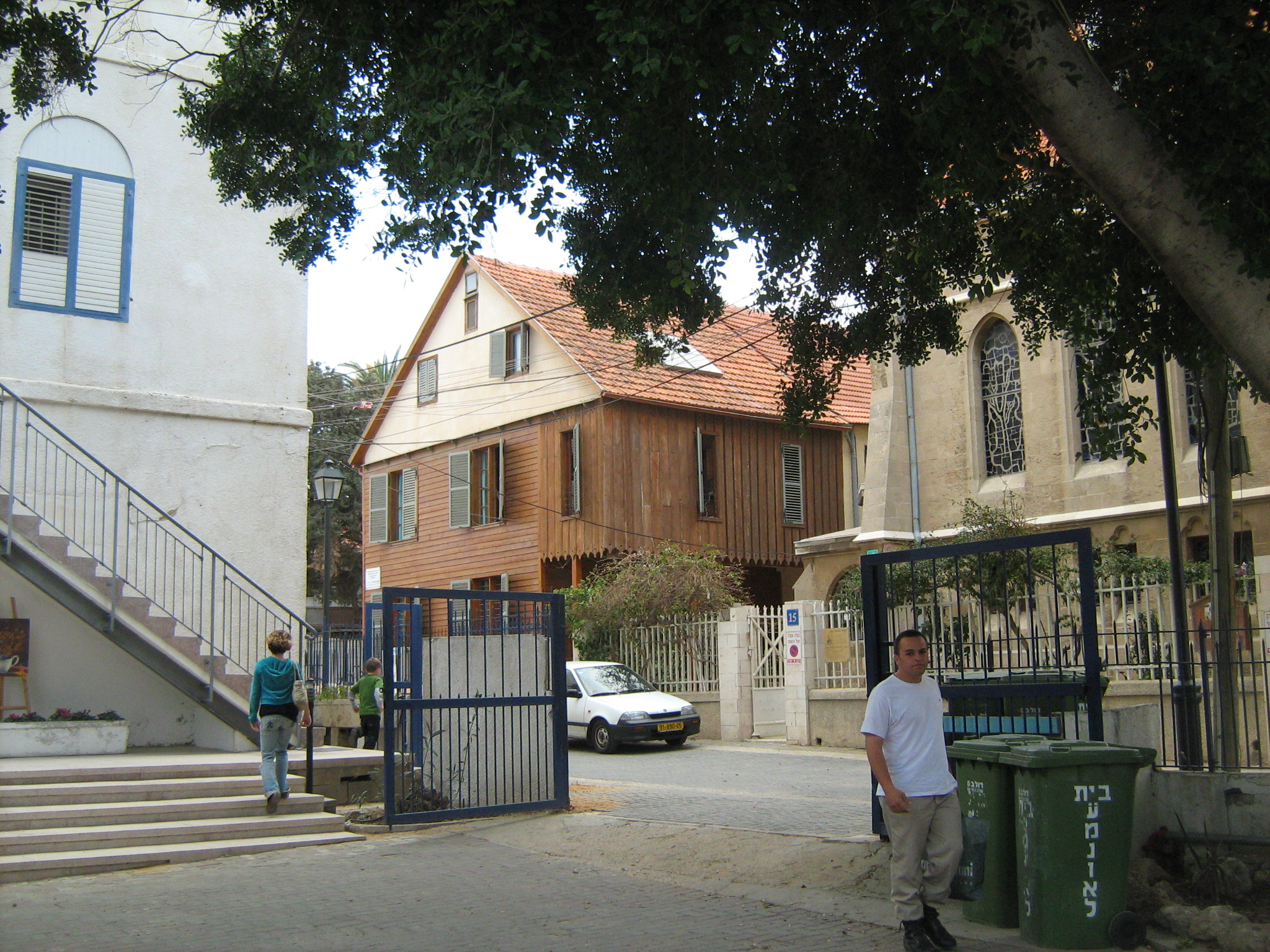
View of a street in the neighborhood

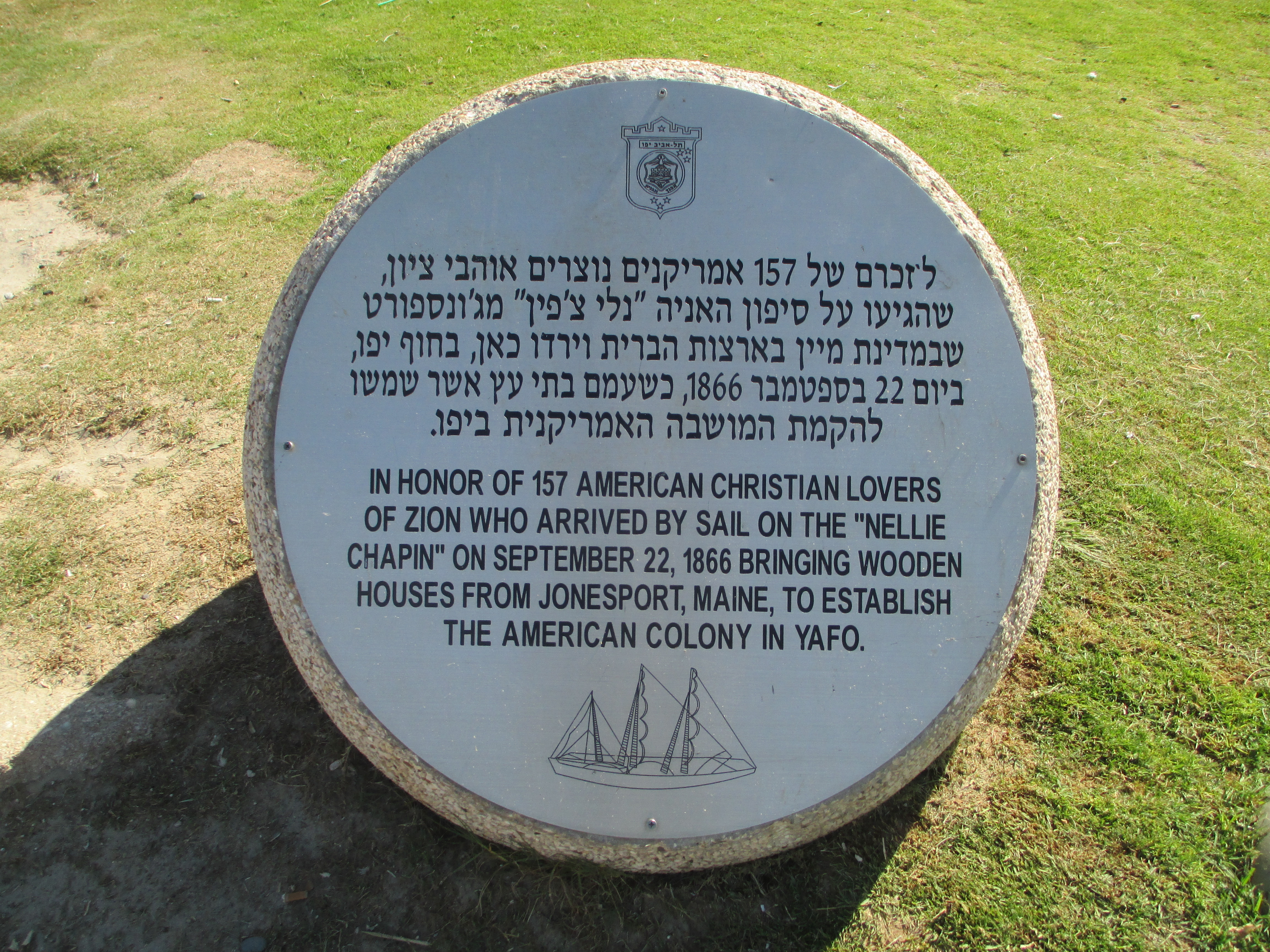
Memorial plaque to the American Colony, Jaffa in Charles Clore Park

However, by June 1874 the Templers had undergone a schism. Temple leader Hardegg and about a third of the Templers seceded from the Temple Society, after personal and substantial quarrels with the other leader Christoph Hoffmann. In 1889 apostatised former Templers, Protestant Swiss and German expatriates, like Plato von Ustinov, and domestic and foreign proselytes gained earlier by Metzler constituted an Evangelical Protestant congregation. Most of its parishioners lived in the colony earning it the name German Colony or Deutsche Kolonie. In 1904 the congregation built its Immanuel Church in the colony. On 17 November 1917 British forces conquered Jaffa and the colony, and most of the male inhabitants of the colony, holding German citizenship, were deported with German prisoners of war to Sidi Bishr and other places in Egypt, later a part of them were sent in 1920 to Bad Mergentheim in Germany In July 1918 women, elderly and children were deported too for two years, under police supervision, to the "Al Hayat" Hotel-Sanatorium in Helwan in Egypt. Enemy alien property was taken into public custody under Edward Keith-Roach, the Public Custodian of Enemy Property. The men were released after the Treaty of Versailles became effective on 10 January 1920. After the Treaty of Lausanne, by which Turkey accepted the British mandate of Palestine, had been ratified on 6 August 1924, the public custody was lifted and the property restituted.

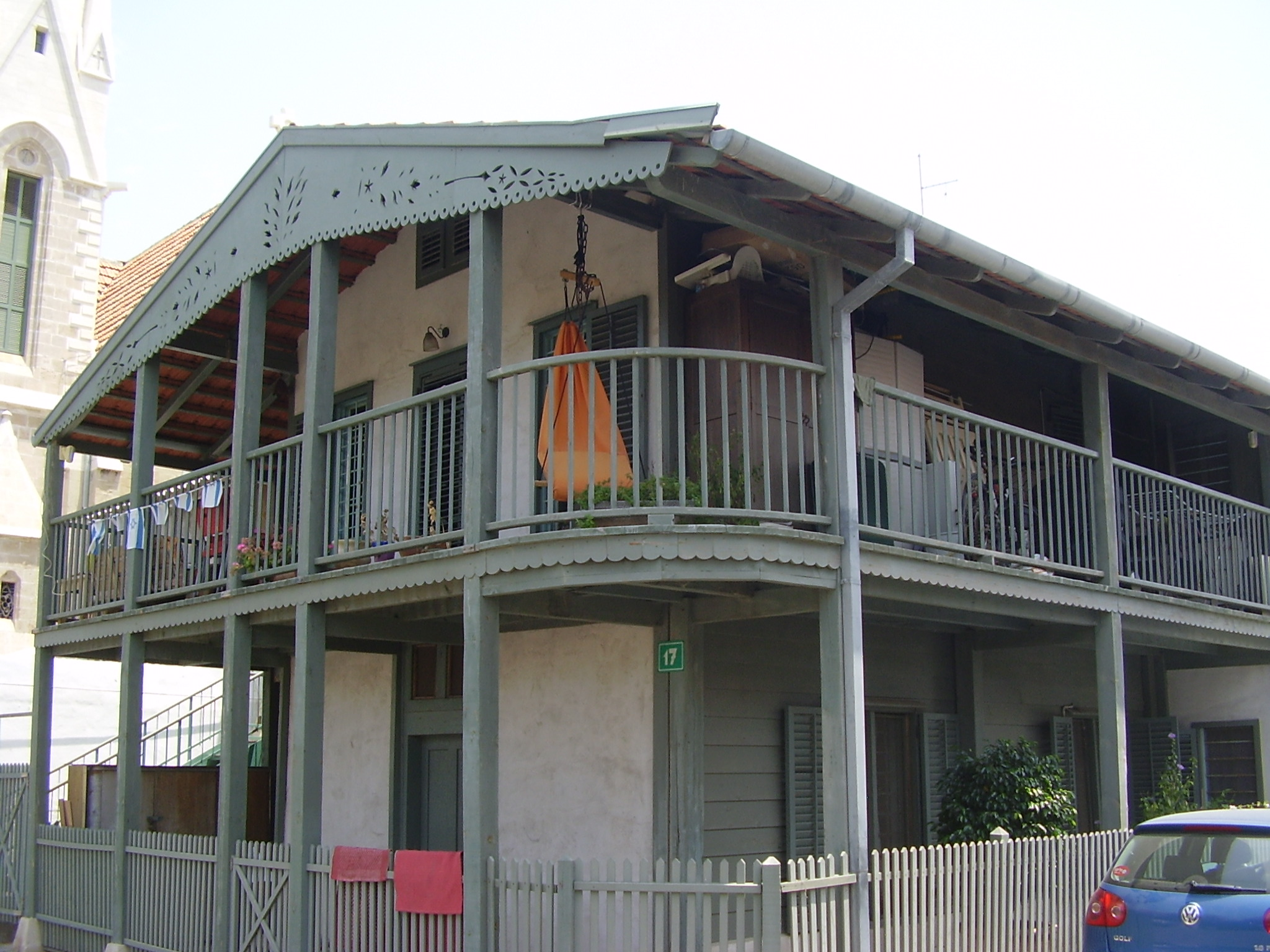
A building in the neighbourhood

After the start of World War II the German colonists were again interned by the British authorities as the citizens of an enemy state in May 1940, and, after internment in Wilhelma, re-settled in Germany and Australia between 1941 and 1948. Enemy alien property came again into public custody under Keith-Roach. The vacant Immanuel Church was subsequently used by the CMJ until the British retreat in 1947. After the foundation of Israel its government took over the enemy alien property in its own custody. In January 1950 the state of Israel expropriated secular German enemy alien property in its own favour in anticipation of a future agreement with Germany on compensations for claims of Israeli citizens against Germany. In the course of the Reparations Agreement between Israel and West Germany both states agreed on the compensation of the expropriated secular property of then German citizens (Property Agreement finally mediated on 1 June 1962 by Max Sørensen). Whereas the buildings of religious usage, like Immanuel Church and its rectory, had remained in public custody and had been handed over to the Lutheran World Federation in 1951 after an agreement of September of that year regulating Israel's compensation of expropriated Protestant religious property of secular purposes, such as schools, farms, factories etc., and the restitution of actual places of worship, cemeteries etc. to Protestant religious bodies. In following years the area gradually suffered neglect, but later came to be re-developed or restored, including by a small number of American Christian restorationists, some of them family descendants from the original Maine community. As with the Neve Tzedek area in general, it is now a higher-middle-class part of Tel Aviv. It is located between Florentin and old Jaffa. It is centered mainly around the Auerbach and Beer-Hofmann streets.

== Landmarks ==
=== Beit Immanuel ===
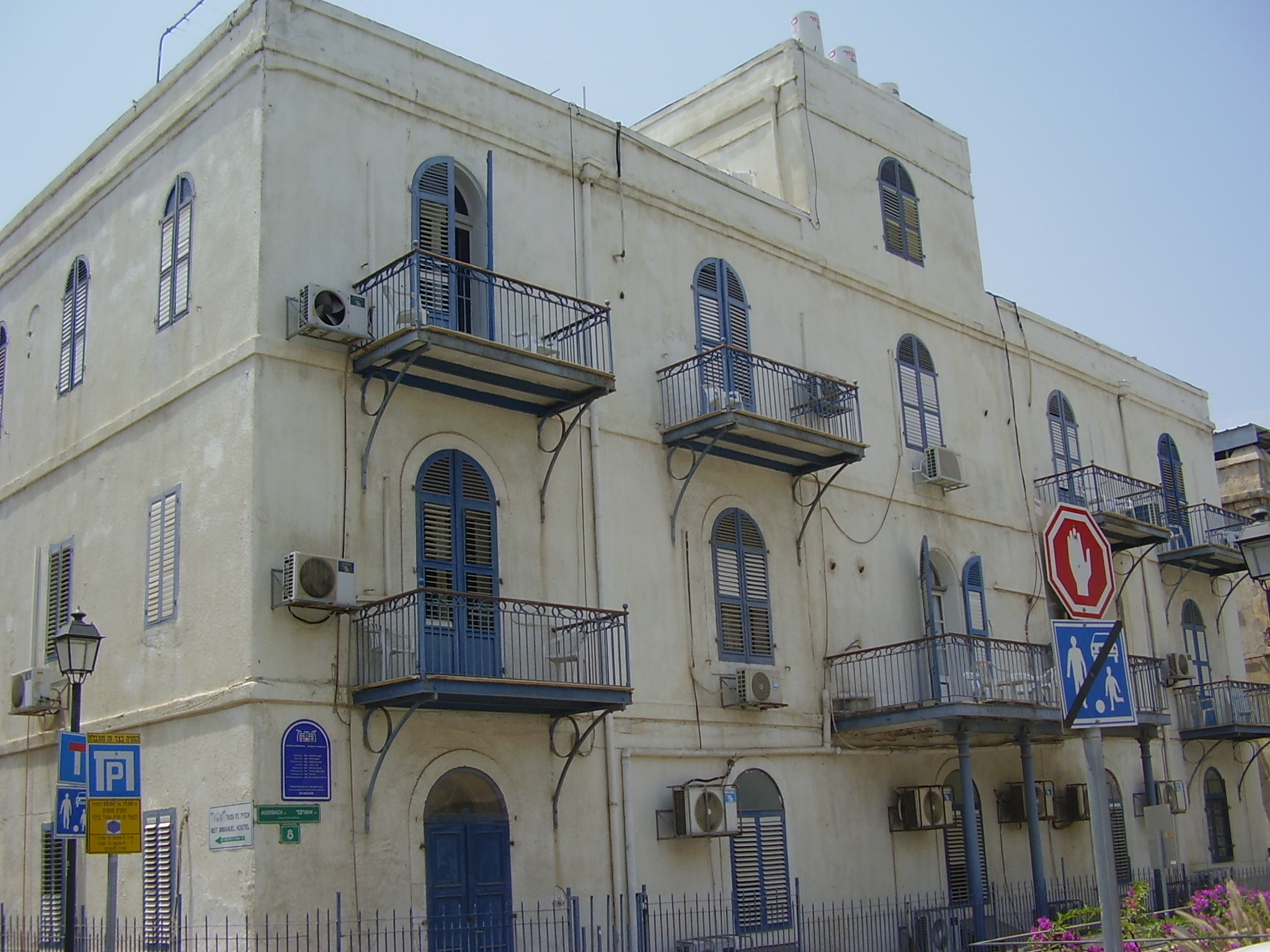
Beit Immanuel on Rechov Auerbach 8, with balconies and arched windows added when Ustinow converted the Tempelstift into his Hôtel du Parc.

In 1873 the Templers erected the Tempelstift, i.e. the main office of the Temple Society, including also a school and a community hall, on then Seestraße 11 (i.e. Sea Street; now renamed and renumbered Rehov Auerbach 8), most likely following plans of the architect Theodor Sandel, one of their fellow faithful. In May 1878 the Templers moved these institutions to the German Colony in the Rephaim valley near Jerusalem and sold the Tempelstift building to the Russian-born German-naturalised Plato von Ustinow, one of Metzler's proselytes. Ustinov extended the building by one more floor, reopened it as Hôtel du Parc and moved into the new top floor. Ustinov employed Bekhōr Nissīm ʾElhādīf, an alumnus of the Miqveh Yisra'el agricultural school. ʾElhādīf (1857–1913) bought exotic plants and trees from all over the world in order to develop the garden of Ustinov's hotel into a botanical park. In 1879 Ustinov opened on the first floor of his hotel a museum exhibiting his growing collection of antiquities from the Holy Land.

In his "Hôtel du Parc" Ustinow housed German Emperor William II, his wife Auguste Victoria, and their closest entourage on their stay in Jaffa on 27 October 1898. Their travel agency Thomas Cook accommodated the imperial guests with Ustinow because his "Hôtel du Parc" was considered the only establishment in Jaffa suited for them. In 1897 and 1898 Templers of Jaffa and Sarona, arguing the title to the construction site would be under dispute, had intrigued with the Sublime Porte and the German Foreign Office against the plans to build Immanuel Church in the colony, so that the laying of the cornerstone, planned to be attended by William II, in his function as king of Prussia also officiating as supreme governor of the Evangelical State Church of Prussia's older Provinces, had to be delayed to after his stay.

After the restitution of the Hôtel du Parc from public custody Magdalena Hall (1868–1945), Ustinov's widow, could dispose of it again and sold it in 1926 to the London Society for Promoting Christianity Among the Jews. Today its successor organisation, the Church's Ministry Among Jewish People (CMJ), operates in the former hotel the Beit Immanuel (Immanuel House), a mission, a pilgrims hostel and a community centre.

=== Immanuel Church ===
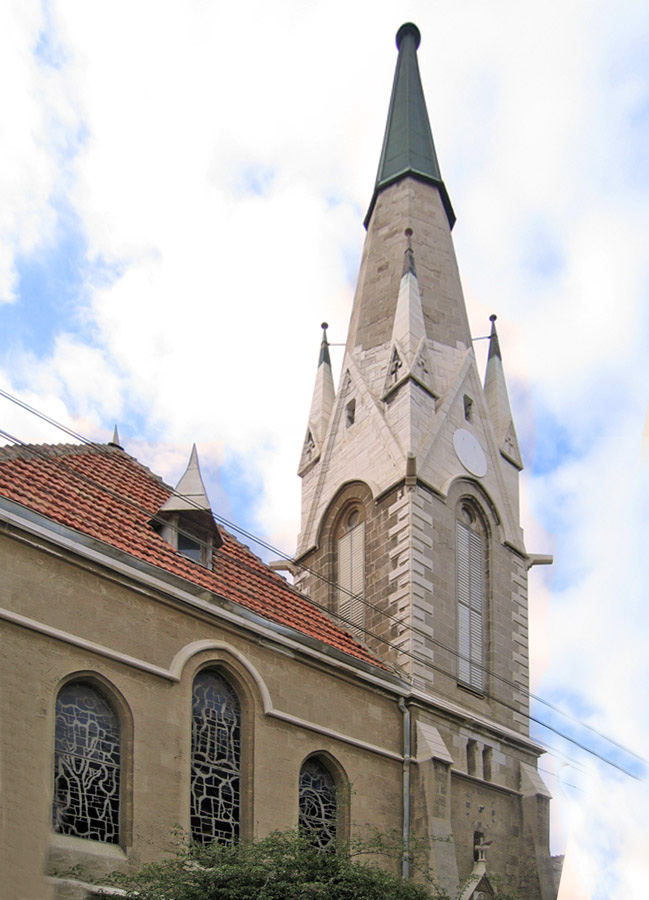
Immanuel Church

A Protestant church named Immanuel Church was built in 1904 for the benefit of the German Evangelical (Protestant) community, which it served until its dissolution at the onset of World War II in 1940.

=== German Consulate building ===
Construction of a building to serve as the Consulate of the German Empire started in 1913 on Nablus Road (today, Eilat street 59 in Tel Aviv). The construction was delayed due to World War I, which broke out in the middle of 1914. As such, the building was inaugurated only in 1916 by the German consul Rössler. The German consulate was closed in the early 1940s and the German residents were deported to Australia, as they were subjects of an enemy country. After the establishment of the State of Israel, the building became a property of the Israeli government.

=== Maine Friendship House ===
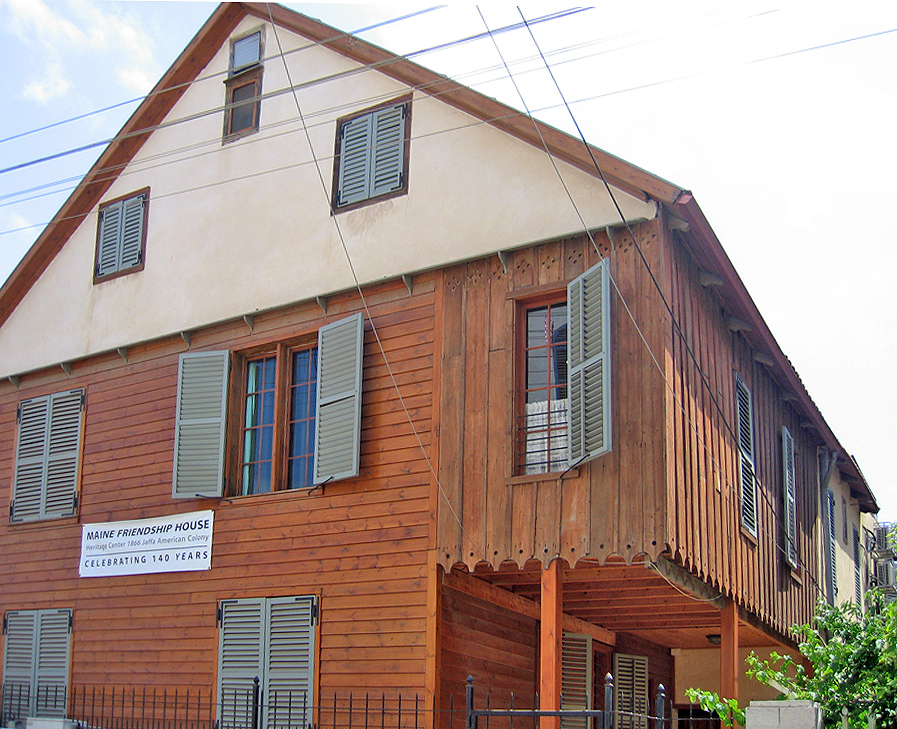
Maine Friendship House in 2007

The Maine Friendship House is a small, New England-style, wooden, clapboard house located on 10 Auerbach Street. It was built in 1866 by a small group of Christian restorationists from Maine who had emigrated to Israel in the hope of preparing the land for the Jews to return and thereby hastening the coming of the Christian Messiah. It was saved from demolition on 14 February 2002.

The house was prefabricated in Whitneyville, Maine and shipped from Machiasport, Maine to Israel as the future home of the Wentworth family. It has been restored by Jean and Reed Holmes of Jonesport, Maine. In 2004 the restoration was the first offshore building to win a Maine Preservation Award. The basement serves as a museum for the history of the American Colony, which presents pictures and personal items that tell the story of the American settlement in the Colony.

=== The Jerusalem Hotel ===
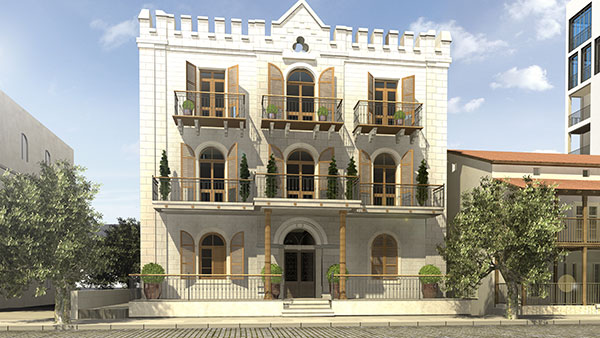
The new Drisco Hotel, comprising the old Jerusalem Hotel building (left) and the old Norton House (right)

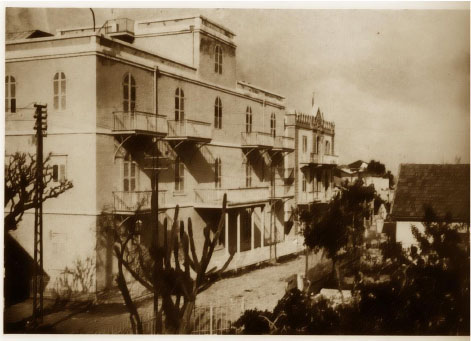
The Hôtel du Parc, and on its right side, almost hidden, the old Jerusalem Hotel

The Hotel Jerusalem was the first ever luxury hotel outside of old Jaffa. It operated between the years 1870 and 1940 and had 57 rooms that occupied 1899 square meters. It was located on 6 Auerbach St. in the historic American Colony that soon became known also as the German Colony. The hotel is an important landmark in the development of Jaffa in the second half of the 19th century by being the first hotel outside of Jaffa’s city walls.

The building is undergoing heavy reconstruction that is expected to be completed by 2017 and will be turned into a 50-room luxury suite hotel. The developers have named it the Drisco Hotel, after the two brothers who had built the original building, John and George Drisco. The Drisco Hotel will also include the historic Norton House that is located on 4 Auerbach Street.

=== The Norton House ===
The Norton House is a two-story wooden building built by P. A. Norton in 1866. It is located on 4 Auerbach St., next to the old Hotel Jerusalem (now the main building of the Drisco Hotel). It was one of the first buildings built in the American Colony by the first American colonists who had arrived earlier that year from Maine. The house was built from pre-fabricated pieces that had been brought by ship with the first settlers and assembled on location.

The house was later sold to Peter Martin Metzler, a German missionary who later sold the house to the London Jews Society, an evangelical Christian movement who turned the house into a religious mission until 1926.

In more modern history, it was home to Israel's first state-sponsored haute couture brand, Maskit, launched in 1954 by Ruth Dayan. In addition, the Norton House was also home to the legendary Keren restaurant which to this day is considered a pioneer of Israeli fine dining. Currently the house is undergoing renovations and will be part of the Drisco Hotel set to open by mid-2016.

== See also ==
- Mount Hope, Jaffa (1853–1858), a nearby farm established by American and Prussian Millennialist Protestants
- The farm at Artas, Bethlehem, inhabited in 1851–53 by members of the same Protestant wave of colonists
- Rolla Floyd, member of the Maine group, first Western tour guide in Palestine; Hebrew article here:.
- History of Tel Aviv

== Bibliography ==
- Eisler, Ejal Jakob (איל יעקב איזלר), Der deutsche Beitrag zum Aufstieg Jaffas 1850–1914: Zur Geschichte Palästinas im 19. Jahrhundert, Wiesbaden: Harrassowitz, 1997, (=Abhandlungen des Deutschen Palästina-Vereins; vol. 22). ISBN 3-447-03928-0.
- Eisler, Ejal Jakob (איל יעקב איזלר), Peter Martin Metzler (1824–1907): Ein christlicher Missionar im Heiligen Land [פטר מרטין מצלר (1907–1824): סיפורו של מיסיונר נוצרי בארץ-ישראל; dt.], Haifa: אוניברסיטת חיפה / המכון ע"ש גוטליב שומכר לחקר פעילות העולם הנוצרי בארץ-ישראל במאה ה-19, 1999 ,(פרסומי המכון ע"ש גוטליב שומכר לחקר פעילות העולם הנוצרי בארץ-ישראל במאה ה-19/=Abhandlungen des Gottlieb-Schumacher-Instituts zur Erforschung des christlichen Beitrags zum Wiederaufbau Palästinas im 19. Jahrhundert; vol. 2). ISBN 965-7109-03-5
- Foerster, Frank, Mission im Heiligen Land: Der Jerusalems-Verein zu Berlin 1852–1945, Gütersloh: Mohn, 1991, (=Missionswissenschaftliche Forschungen; [N.S.], vol. 25). ISBN 3-579-00245-7
- Glenk, Helmut with Blaich, Horst & Haering, Manfred,From Desert Sands to Golden Oranges: The History of the German Templer Settlement of Sarona in Palestine, 1871–1947, copyright Helmut Glenk 2005
- Hansen, Niels, Aus dem Schatten der Katastrophe: Die deutsch-israelischen Beziehungen in der Ära Konrad Adenauer und David Ben Gurion. Ein dokumentierter Bericht mit einem Geleitwort von Shimon Peres, Düsseldorf: Droste, 2002, (=Forschungen und Quellen zur Zeitgeschichte; vol. 38). ISBN 3-7700-1886-9
