= Niels Hansen (diplomat) =

German diplomat

Niels Hansen (born 7 November 1924 in Heidelberg; died 4 January 2015 in Bad Godesberg) was a German diplomat.

== Early life ==
Hansen attended high school in Lübeck. During World War II, he was a soldier in Italy. After the war, Hansen initially studied medicine but switched to law. He studied in Göttingen, Hamburg, Heidelberg, Zurich and Geneva. There he attended the Graduate Institute of International Studies. He graduated with a license in law (1951) and a doctorate in law in 1955.

== Career ==
He was ambassador to Israel (1981-1985) and permanent representative to NATO in Brussels (1985-1989). He was also the author of Out of the Shadows of the Catastrophe: German-Israeli Relations in the Era of Konrad Adenauer and David Ben-Gurion (in German: Aus Dem Schatten Der Katastrophe: Die Deutsch-Israelischen Beziehungen in Der Ara Konrad Adenauer Und David Ben Gurion).

== Recognition ==
In 1990, Tel Aviv University awarded him an honorary doctorate.
