= Edward Keith-Roach =

British Colonial administrator

Edward Keith-Roach CBE
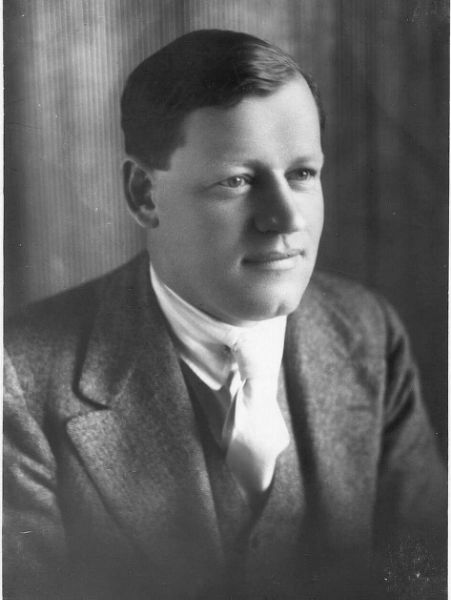

Administrator of Palestine

Personal details
- Born: 1885 Gloucester, England
- Died: 1954 (aged 68–69)

Edward Keith-Roach OBE CBE (Born 1885 Gloucester, England - died 1954) was the British Colonial administrator during the British mandate on Palestine, who also served as the governor of Jerusalem from 1926 to 1945 (excluding a period in the 1930s when he was governor of Galilee). He was posted during a period of great political upheaval, Reuters labelling him 'the Pasha of Jerusalem'.
