= George J. Adams =

Founder of the Church of the Messiah (1811–1880)

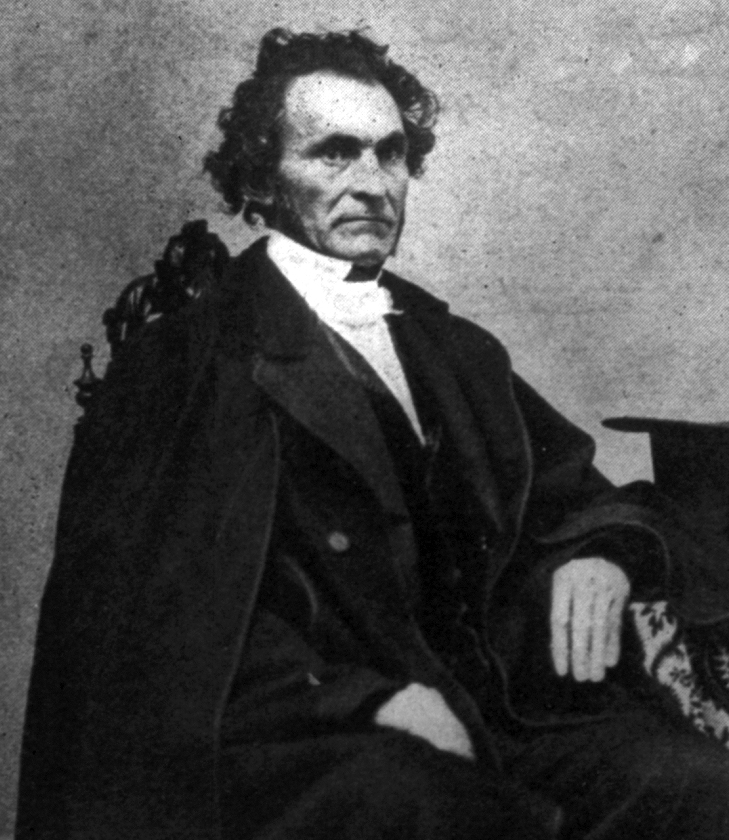
- Adams c. 1841

Founder of the Church of the Messiah
- 1861

Member of the First Presidency in the Church of Jesus Christ of Latter Day Saints.
- 1846 – 1851
- Called by: James Strang
- End reason: Excommunicated from the Strangite church

Member of the Council of Fifty
- Between Mar. 14 and Apr. 11, 1844 – February 4, 1845
- Called by: Joseph Smith
- End reason: Excommunicated from LDS Church

Personal details
- Born: George Jones Adams c. 1811; Oxford, New Jersey
- Died: May 11, 1880; Philadelphia, Pennsylvania, United States
- Cause of death: "typhoid pneumonia"

George Jones Adams (c. 1811 – May 11, 1880) was the leader of a schismatic Latter Day Saint sect who led an ill-fated effort to establish a colony of Americans in Palestine. Adams was also briefly a member of the First Presidency in the Church of Jesus Christ of Latter Day Saints (Strangite). In preparation for colonizing Palestine, he changed his name to George Washington Joshua Adams, to tie himself to two well-known country builders: George Washington of the United States and Joshua, from the Hebrew Bible.

== Conversion and early church service ==
George Jones Adams was born in Oxford, New Jersey of Welsh descent. By the 1830s, he had been trained as a Methodist preacher and was a merchant tailor. He was also an aspiring Shakespearean actor, but had little success in being cast in roles.

While traveling from Boston to New York City in February 1840, George, and his wife Caroline (née Youngs) Adams, heard the preaching of Latter Day Saint apostle Heber C. Kimball, and were baptized into the Church of Jesus Christ of Latter Day Saints the same week. Within a month he had become an elder in the church. In the spring/summer of 1840, the Brooklyn Branch was organized with him as branch president in New York City, NY (HC, 4:22). In 1841, Adams traveled to England as a missionary for the church; he was successful in winning numerous converts and stayed in England for eighteen months. Adams returned from England with a one-year-old son, George Oscar; his wife Caroline would raise the boy as her own.

In October 1843, church president Joseph Smith asked Adams to travel with apostle Orson Hyde as a missionary to Russia. In 1844, Smith invited Adams to join the exclusive Council of Fifty. On June 7, 1844, Smith set apart Adams "to be an apostle and special witness ... to the empire of Russia", in preparation for the Mormon political kingdom. However, just prior to Adams' planned departure later that month, all church political efforts were suspended after Smith was killed and the church was thrown into turmoil. Adams returned to New England as a regular missionary, and, along with William Smith, Joseph Smith's surviving brother, created much turmoil among the branches there, claiming to be the "Thirteenth Apostle" and "greater than Paul," and therefore having more authority than any of the Quorum of the Twelve Apostles. On April 10, 1845, Adams was excommunicated by the Quorum of Twelve Apostles for proposing that the church be led by Joseph Smith III (Joseph Smith's eldest son) under the guardianship of William Smith.

Back in Boston in 1847, Adams was the main witness in the trial of Cobb v. Cobb, in which Henry Cobb sued his wife, Augusta Adams Cobb, for divorce, for having committed adultery with Joseph Smith's successor, Brigham Young; she had married Young in November 1843 without first divorcing Henry. The court case went to the Massachusetts Supreme Judicial Court, presided over by Chief Justice Lemuel Shaw, and was widely reported in newspapers nationwide.

== Strangite leader ==
After his excommunication, Adams came to accept the spiritual leadership of James J. Strang, and in December 1846 became editor of Star in the East, a Strangite publication printed in Boston. He then was ordained Strang's counselor in the Church of Jesus Christ of Latter Day Saints (Strangite). In 1850, Adams crowned Strang with a metal crown as a spiritual "king of Israel", and Adams was appointed to be Strang's "prime minister" and "viceroy". However, by 1851, Adams had been excommunicated from the Strangite church on recurring charges of embezzlement, adultery, apostasy, and drunkenness. Adams and his second wife, Louisa Isabella Pray, moved to Maine where they had two children, son Clarence and daughter Georgina Augustine.

== Church of the Messiah ==
By the late 1850s, Adams had established a church in New England called the Church of the Messiah. Adams claimed to be a prophet of Jesus Christ to the world and began publication of a periodical called The Sword of Truth and Harbinger of Peace. In 1864, Adams established the headquarters of his church in Washington County, Maine, near the Canada–US border. Later that year, Adams announced a great mission whereby he and his followers would travel to and settle in Palestine. Adams taught that their colony could prepare the land for the return of the Jews, which in turn would hasten the Second Coming of Jesus. The members of the church donated much of their money to the church in an effort to realize Adam's proposal.

== Settlement in Palestine ==
Adams' friendship with Orson Hyde heavily influenced his decision to move to Palestine. Hyde was the first Mormon envoy to Jerusalem, and Adams "dreamed of replicating Hyde's pilgrimage to the Holy Land." After migrating around the Northeast for some years, Adams settled in Indian River, Maine, and prophesied that the prerequisite the Second Coming was "the Jews' restoration to Palestine."

In 1865, Adams and Indian River's postmaster, Abraham McKenszie, traveled to Palestine and arranged for the purchase of a tract of land near Jaffa. Upon returning to the United States, Adams organized the Palestine Emigration Association to coordinate his church's move. In February 1866, Adams was received by U.S. President Andrew Johnson and Secretary of State William H. Seward at the White House. Seward agreed to expedite a petition from Adams and his church members to the government of the Ottoman Empire to ensure that the American settlers' title to the land Adams arranged to purchase was respected.

One hundred and fifty-six members of the Church of the Messiah sailed from Boston to Jaffa on the Nellie Chapin, arriving on September 22, 1866. The colony began by camping on the beach, relying on local Arabs for food and water. Within a month, six children and three adults had died. By November, the colony had erected a number of simple frame houses.

The pilgrims secured a 10-acre (40,000 m^{2}) plot of land outside of Jaffa, where they founded the American Colony, named Amelican in Arabic, or Adams City in English, between today's Rechov Eilat and Rechov haRabbi mi-Bacherach in Tel Aviv-Yafo. However, the settlers quickly encountered problems. Scavengers ravaged their crops and the community faced famine heading into the winter of 1866-67. This and the climate, the insecure and arbitrary treatment by the Ottoman authorities, made many colonists willing to return to Maine.

But their leader Adams withheld their money, which the colonists had earlier conveyed to him. So the missionary Peter Metzler of the Protestant mission in Jaffa bought the land of five colonists, providing them the funds to leave. Adams was drinking heavily at the time and had lost his control over the colonists. In April, a group of colonists appealed to the American consul to the Ottoman Empire for assistance in returning to America. By the end of the month, the U.S. government had arranged for 26 settlers to return. By the end of summer, after the colony's crop harvest was a disastrous failure, only Adams and 40 other settlers remained. By October 1867, the U.S. State Department had appropriated $3000 for the return of any of the remaining colonists who wished to leave Palestine, while by December 1867, the colony had run out of money and resources.

Some of the colonists traveled back to America on the ship Quaker City; Mark Twain was a passenger on the same journey and he wrote about the failed settlers in his 1869 book The Innocents Abroad. Upon returning to the United States, many of Adams' former followers joined the Reorganized Church of Jesus Christ of Latter Day Saints. In June 1868, Adams and his wife left Palestine and sailed to England. Twenty of the original colonists remained in Palestine, some of them permanently.

The colonists who left would sell much of their real estate in the colony to newly arriving settlers, called Templers, coming from Württemberg in 1869. On 5 March 1869 also Metzler sold most of his real estate to the new colonists, thus Adams City became later known as the German Colony of Jaffa.

== Return to America and death ==
Although Adams preached briefly in Liverpool and tried to raise followers for a second attempt at settling Palestine, he had returned to America by 1870. He preached in Philadelphia and in 1873 opened a "Church of the Messiah" building for Sunday sermons. When confronted on his past exploits by former followers or others, Adams would deny his identity and past. He died in Philadelphia of "typhoid pneumonia". His son, Clarence A. Adams, was a Baptist clergyman in Pennsylvania until his death in the 1920s.
