= Nazi Party in Mandatory Palestine =

Nazi Party of Palestine and the Levant
- Founded: 1933
- Dissolved: 1939
- Ideology: Nazism

The Nazi Party in Mandatory Palestine, also referred as the Nazi Party of Palestine and the Levant was a local branch of the Nazi Party in British-ruled Mandatory Palestine, established by members of the German Templer colonies in Palestine. The branch was established in March 1933 and gradually eradicated during the World War II by the British authorities via deportation of its members and their families. Some of the party members enlisted into the Nazi German military and participated in operations on behalf of the axis powers, notoriously including Operation Atlas targeting Mandatory Palestine.

== History ==
=== Background ===
After the Nazi takeover in Germany the new Reich's government streamlined foreign policy according to Nazi ideals, imposed and regulated financially. The Nazi emphasis was on creating the image that Germany and Germanness were equal to Nazism. Thus, all non-Nazi aspects of German culture and identity were discriminated against as un-German. All international schools of German language subsidised or fully financed by government funds were obliged to redraw their educational programs and to solely employ teachers aligned to the Nazi Party. The teachers in Bethlehem were financed by the Reich government, so Nazi teachers also took over there.

=== Establishment ===
Karl Ruf from Haifa set up the two chapters of the Nazi Party Palestine branch in Sarona and Jaffa in March 1933, but during most of the time it was Cornelius Schwarz who served as head of the party. In 1933, Templer functionaries and other Gentile Germans living in Palestine appealed to Paul von Hindenburg and the Foreign Office not to use swastika symbols for German institutions, though without success. Some German Gentiles from Palestine pleaded with the Reich government to drop its plan to boycott Jewish owned shops, in April 1933. Some Templers enlisted in the German Army. In the summer of 1933 the party numbered 42 members.

In 1934, the Nazi Party numbers reached 239, with the largest chapter in Jerusalem counting some 67 members.

By 1938, 17% of the Templers in Mandatory Palestine were members of the Nazi Party. According to historian Yossi Ben-Artzi, "The members of the younger generation to some extent broke away from naive religious belief, and were more receptive to the Nazi German nationalism. The older ones tried to fight it."

=== Internment, deportation and exchanges ===
After the outbreak of World War II, the British disbanded the Nazi Party in Mandatory Palestine. Templar colonists with German citizenship were rounded up by the British authorities and sent, together with Italian and Hungarian enemy aliens, to internment camps in Waldheim and Bethlehem of Galilee. On July 31, 1941, 661 Templers and other Germans in Palestine were deported to Australia via Egypt, leaving behind 345 in Palestine. Likewise the British authorities declared the Templers enemy nationals, arresting and deporting many them to Australia. During the war the British government brokered the exchange of about 1,000 Templers for 550 Jews under German control. These Jews were mostly Palestinian or residents with relatives in British Palestine. As a result, the Nazi Party branch remained with very few members.

=== Participation in military operations ===
Operation Atlas was the code name for an operation carried out by a special commando unit of the Waffen SS which took place in October 1944. It involved five soldiers: three who were previously members of the Templer religious sect in Mandatory Palestine, and two Palestinian Arabs who were close collaborators of the mufti of Jerusalem, Amin al-Husseini.

Atlas aimed at establishing an intelligence-gathering base in Mandatory Palestine, radioing information back to Germany, and recruiting and arming anti-British Palestinians by buying their support with gold.

The plan failed utterly, and no meaningful action could be undertaken by the commandos. Three of the participants were arrested by the Transjordan Frontier Force a few days after their landing. The German commander was captured in 1946 and the fifth, Hasan Salama, succeeded in escaping.

== Persecution of former party members ==
On 12 March 1946 a team from the Zionist Haganah assassinated the leader of the Templer community, Gotthilf Wagner, considered by Palestinian Jews to be an ardent member of the Nazi Party, although his family and the wider Templer community argued otherwise.

The Haganah also kidnapped an 18-year-old member of the Lehi militant group and interrogated him for 3 weeks. The boy allegedly said, “We will communicate with any military power ready to help with the establishment of the kingdom of Israel, even if it’s Germany … The only condition is that we get weapons, so we can rebel against the English".

== See also ==
- Palestine Arab Party
- Al-Muthanna Club (Iraqi Fascist movement)
- Golden Square (Iraq)
