= The Sweetheart of the Templar from the Valley of Rephaim =

2009 novel by Gad Shimron

- Author: Gad Shimron
- Original title: אהובת הטמפלר מעמק רפאים
- Language: Hebrew
- Genre: Historical novel
- Publication date: 2009
- Publication place: Israel

The Sweetheart of the Templar from the Valley of Rephaim (Hebrew: אהובת הטמפלר מעמק רפאים) is a historical novel by the Israeli author Gad Shimron published in 2009.

The novel describes a love story between a young Jewish woman and a young German Templar in the Valley of Rephaim, which occurs during the period of the Second World War and during the period prior to the war. The fictional story is integrated with real events and characters. The core feature of the book's plot focuses on Operation ATLAS, in which three Nazi soldiers and two Palestinian-Arab paratroopers were parachuted into the region of Palestine in 1944 for the purposes of sabotage.

== Synopsis ==
The novel's plot takes place in Jerusalem in the days of World War II and focuses on the love story of Tamar-Henrietta Landver, a Jewish girl from Vienna who managed to flee from the Nazis to the region of Palestine prior to the war, to Wolfgang Shvarte, a German Templar who was born in the region of Palestine and raised in the German Templar Colony in Jerusalem.

The story begins in the present (1995) with the death of Tamar and then returns to the past, and describes Tamar and Wolfgang's meeting and how they eventually were separated due to heavy social pressure, months before the war began.

Although Wolfgang returned to Germany before the outbreak of World War II, the plot thickens when the two meet by chance in 1942 in the region of Palestine as the Nazi military forces were approaching the region of Palestine and preparing an attack on the Jewish communities in the region.
