= Shimron (disambiguation) =

Shimron is a biblical city in northern Israel.

Shimron may also refer to:

- Shimron, son of Issachar
- Gad Shimron, Israeli journalist
- Shimron Hetmyer, West Indian cricketer, who also plays for Guyana
