= 1947–1948 civil war in Mandatory Palestine =

First phase of the 1947–1949 Palestine war

- Part of the intercommunal conflict in Mandatory Palestine, the 1948 Palestine War and the decolonisation of Asia
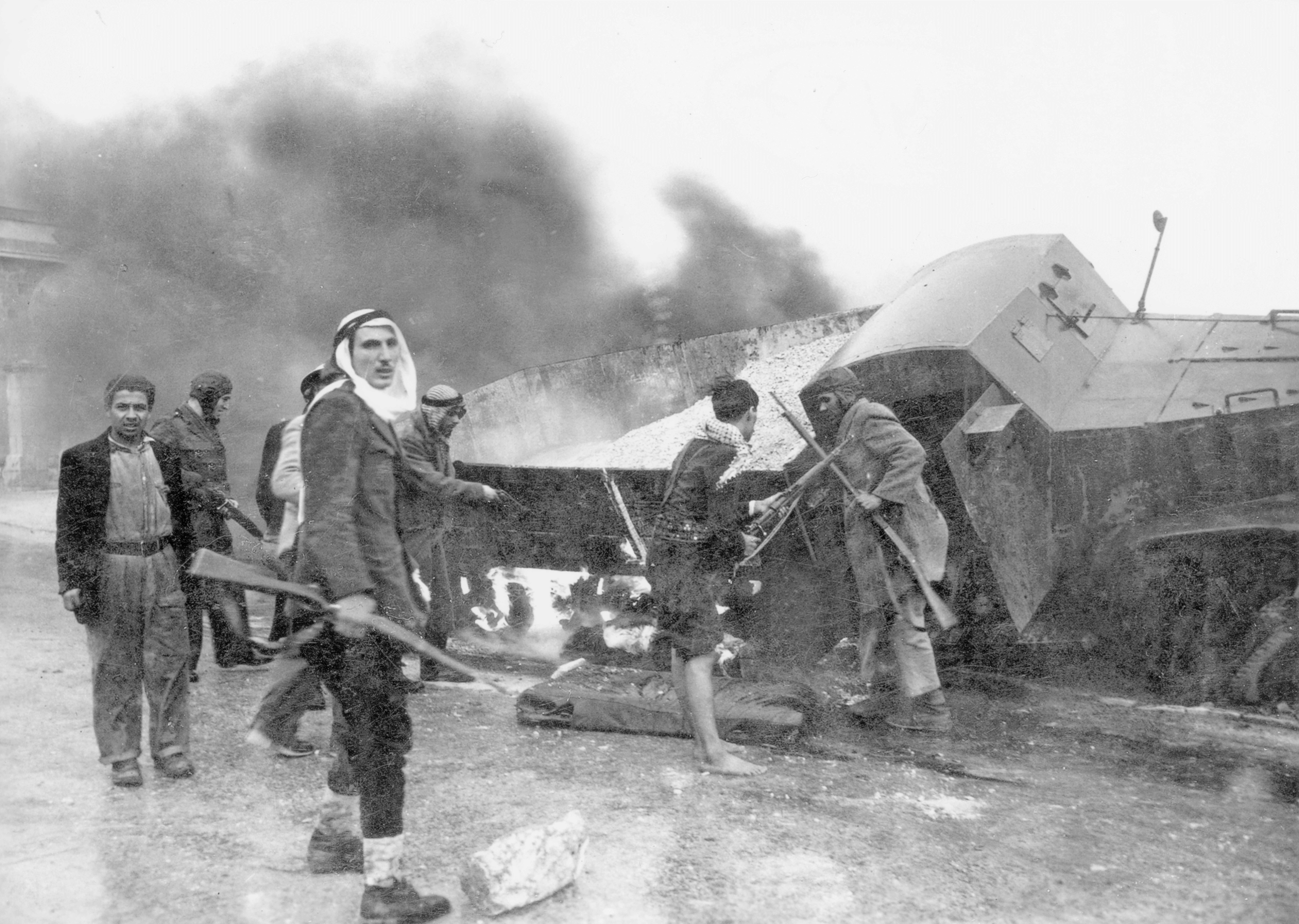
- Palestinian fighters in front of a burning Haganah armoured supply truck near the city of Jerusalem (March 1948)
Date	30 November 1947 – 14 May 1948 (5 months and 2 weeks)
Location	Mandatory Palestine
Result	Jewish National Council victory; Issuance of the Israeli Declaration of Independence; Intervention by neighbouring Arab states, beginning the 1948 Arab–Israeli War

Belligerents
(Israel) Jewish National Council; Haganah; Palmach; Irgun; Lehi; Foreign volunteers Mahal; Allied Bedouin tribes	Arab Higher Committee; (All-Palestine Protectorate) Army of the Holy War; Arab Liberation Army; Transjordan; Arab Legion	United Kingdom; Mandatory Palestine

Commanders and leaders
(Israel) David Ben-Gurion (Israel) Yaakov Dori (Israel) Yigael Yadin (Israel) Yigal Allon (Israel) Menachem Begin	Fawzi al-Qawuqji; Abd al-Qadir al-Husayni †	(Mandatory Palestine) Gordon MacMillan

Strength
15,000 (start); 35,000 (end)	Arabs: A few thousand British deserters: ~100–200	70,000

Casualties and losses
9 April: 895 killed	9 April: 991 killed	9 April: 123 killed 300 wounded

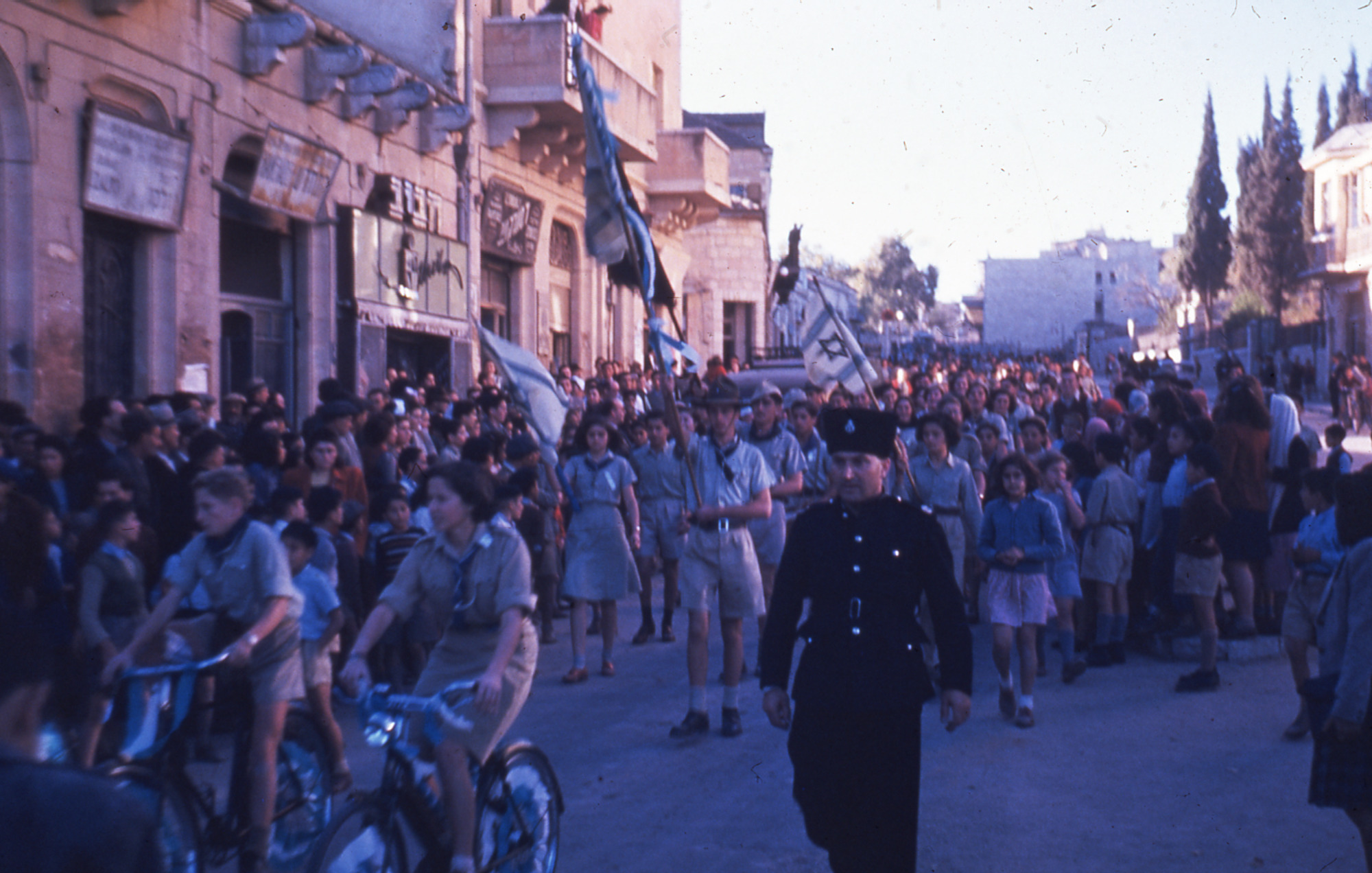
Jerusalem is celebrating the UN resolution on the Partition Plan for Palestine in 1947.

The 1947–1948 civil war in Mandatory Palestine (29 November 1947 – 14 May 1948) was the first phase of the 1948 Palestine war (29 November 1947 – 10 March 1949). It broke out after the General Assembly of the United Nations adopted a resolution on 29 November 1947 recommending the adoption of the Partition Plan for Palestine.

During the civil war, Palestine's Jewish and Arab communities clashed (the latter supported by the Arab Liberation Army) while the British, who had the obligation to maintain order, organized their withdrawal and intervened only occasionally.

At the end of the civil war phase of the war, from April 1948 to mid-May, Zionist forces embarked on an offensive (Plan Dalet) that involved conquering cities and territories in Palestine allocated to a future Jewish state, as well as those allocated to the corpus separatum of Jerusalem and a future Arab state according to the 1947 Partition plan for Palestine. This offensive greatly accelerated the 1948 Palestinian expulsion and flight, which was effected by various violent means, including a number of massacres such as the widely publicized Deir Yassin massacre.

When the British Mandate of Palestine ended on 14 May 1948, and with the Declaration of the Establishment of the State of Israel, the surrounding Arab states—Egypt, Transjordan, Iraq, and Syria—invaded what had just ceased to be Mandatory Palestine occupying its Arab areas then immediately attacking Israeli forces and several Jewish settlements. The conflict thus escalated and became the 1948 Arab–Israeli War.

== Background ==
Under the control of a British administration since 1920, Palestine found itself the object of a battle between Palestinian and Zionist nationalists, groups that opposed both the British mandate and each other.

The Palestinian opposition culminated in the 1936–1939 Arab revolt in Palestine, a deadly civil conflict that saw the deaths of nearly 5,000 Palestinian Arabs and 500 Jews and drove much of the Palestinian political leadership, including Amin al-Husseini, leader of the Arab Higher Committee, into exile. Britain also reduced Jewish immigration in response to the violence, as legislated by the 1939 White Paper.

After World War II and The Holocaust, the Zionist movement gained attention and sympathy. In Mandatory Palestine, Zionist groups fought against the British administration. In the two and a half years from 1945 to June 1947, British law enforcement forces lost 103 dead and sustained 391 wounded by Jewish militants. Palestinian Arab nationalists reorganized, but their organization remained inferior to the Zionists'.

On 15 August 1947, the Haganah blew up the house of a Palestinian family near Petah Tikva, killing 12 occupants, including a woman and six children. After November 1947, the dynamiting of houses formed a key component of most Haganah strikes.

Diplomacy failed to reconcile the different points of view on Palestine's future. In early November, the Haganah began mobilizing for war, and issued an order that all men between 17 and 25 register. On 18 February 1947, the British announced their withdrawal from the region and on 29 November, the General Assembly of the United Nations voted to recommend the adoption and implementation of the partition plan with the support of the big global powers, though the Arab states opposed it.

== Beginning of the civil war (30 November 1947 – 1 April 1948) ==
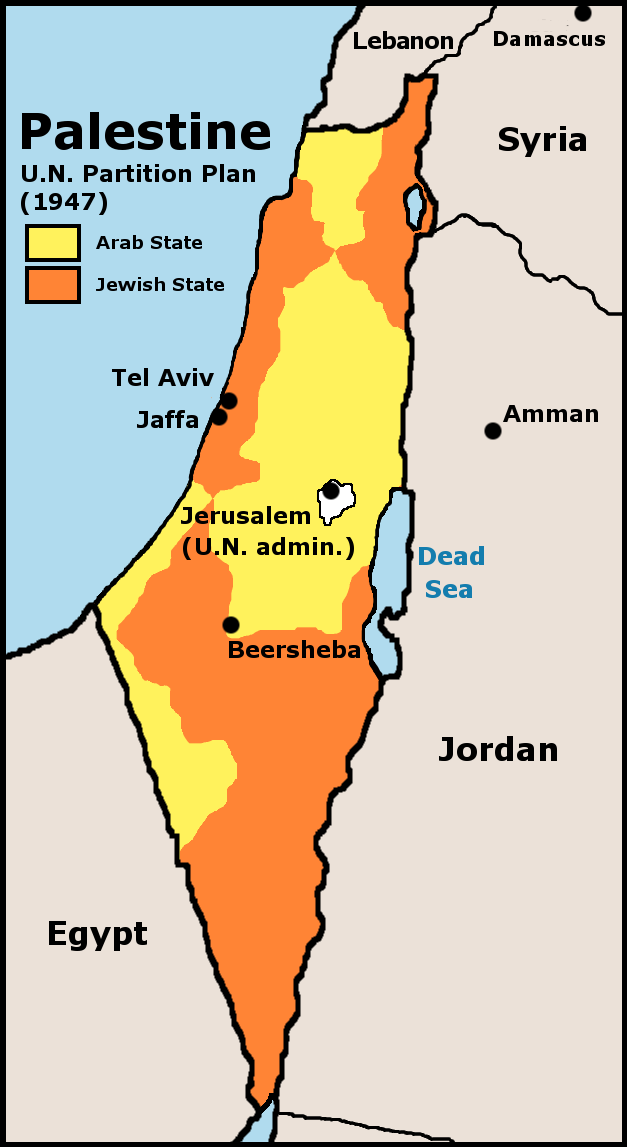
The 1947 UN Partition Plan recommended dividing Palestine into a Jewish state and an Arab state.

In the aftermath of the adoption of Resolution 181(II) by the United Nations General Assembly recommending the adoption and implementation of the Plan of Partition, the manifestations of joy of the Jewish community were counterbalanced by protests by Arabs throughout the country and after 1 December, the Arab Higher Committee enacted a general strike that lasted three days.

A "wind of violence" took hold of the country, foreboding civil war between the two communities. Murders, reprisals, and counter-reprisals resulted in dozens killed on both sides in the process. The impasse persisted as British forces did not intervene to stop the violence.

The first casualties after the adoption of Resolution 181(II) were passengers on a Jewish bus near Kfar Sirkin on 30 November, after an eight-man gang from Jaffa ambushed the bus killing five and wounding others. Half an hour later they ambushed a second bus, southbound from Hadera, killing two more, and shots were fired at Jewish buses in Jerusalem and Haifa. This was said to be a retaliation for the Shubaki family assassination, the killing ten days earlier of five Palestinian Arabs by Lehi near Herzliya.

Irgun and Lehi (the latter also known as the Stern Gang) followed their strategy of placing bombs in crowded markets and bus stops. On 30 December, in Haifa, members of the Irgun threw two bombs at a crowd of Arab workers who were queueing in front of a refinery, killing 6 and injuring 42. An angry crowd massacred 39 Jewish people in revenge until British soldiers reestablished calm. In reprisal, soldiers from the Palmach and the Carmeli brigade attacked the villages of Balad ash-Sheikh and Hawassa. In what became known as the Balad al-Shaykh massacre, between 60 and 70 villagers were killed. (Note: Golani & Manna 2011, "70 village residents – including men, women and children – were murdered in their homes") (Note: Lockman 1996, "The Jewish attackers killed some sixty men, women, and children and destroyed several houses.") (Note: Pappé 2006, "Over sixty Palestinians dead")

In early 1948, forces under the command of Abd al-Qadir al-Husayni set up a blockade of Jerusalem, with its 100,000 Jewish residents. To counter this, the Yishuv authorities tried to supply the city with convoys of up to 100 armoured vehicles, but the operation became increasingly impractical as casualties in the relief convoys surged. By March, Al-Husayni's tactic had paid off. Almost all the Haganah's armoured vehicles had been destroyed, the blockade was in full operation, and hundreds of Haganah members who had tried to bring supplies into the city were killed. The situation for those who dwelt in the Jewish settlements in the highly isolated Negev and North of Galilee was even more critical.

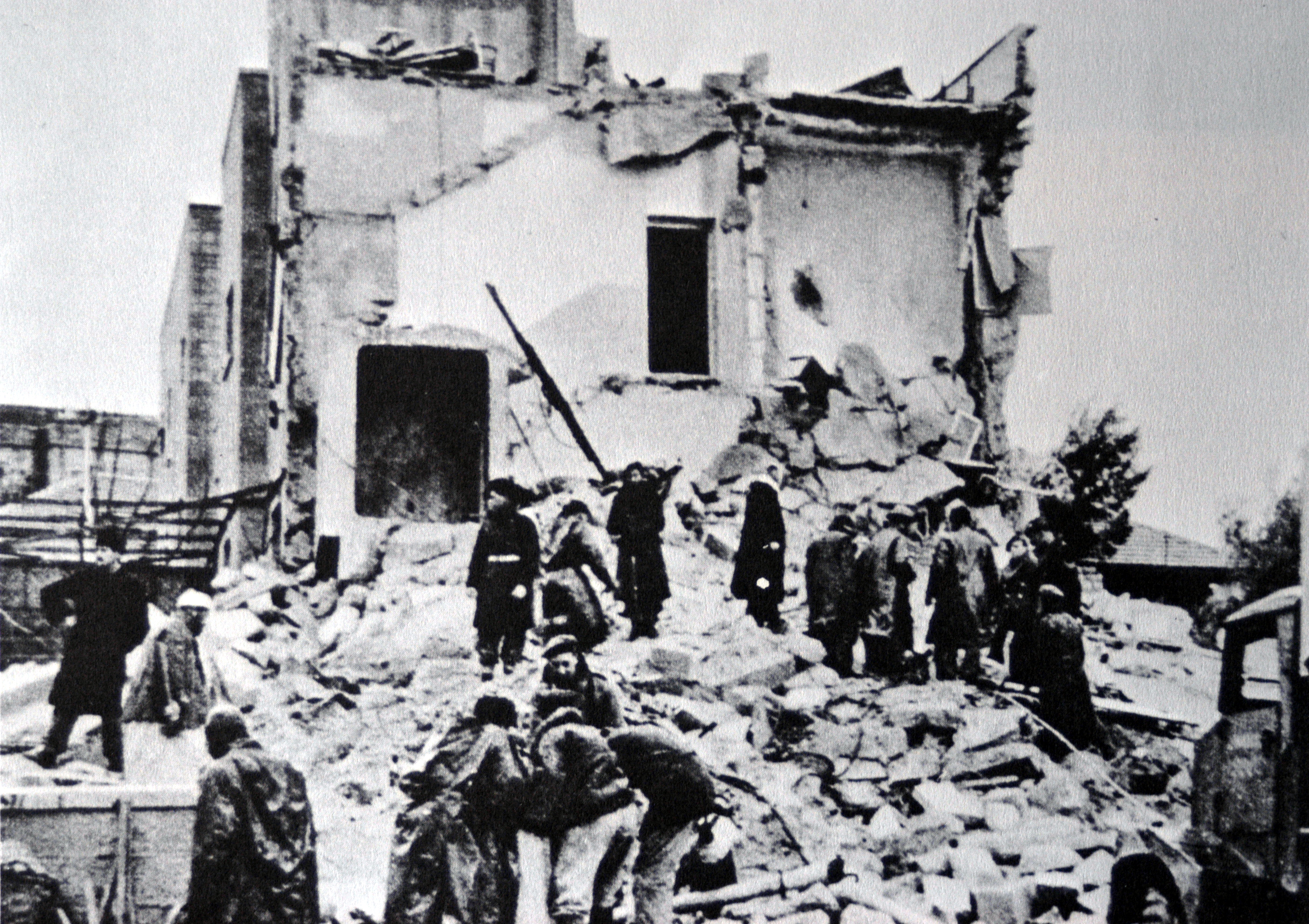
Aftermath of the Semiramis Hotel bombing, perpetrated by the Haganah

From January onward, operations became increasingly militarized. In all the mixed zones where both communities lived, particularly Jerusalem and Haifa, there were increasingly violent attacks, riots, reprisals and counter-reprisals. Isolated shootings evolved into all-out battles. Attacks against traffic, for instance, turned into ambushes as one bloody attack led to another.

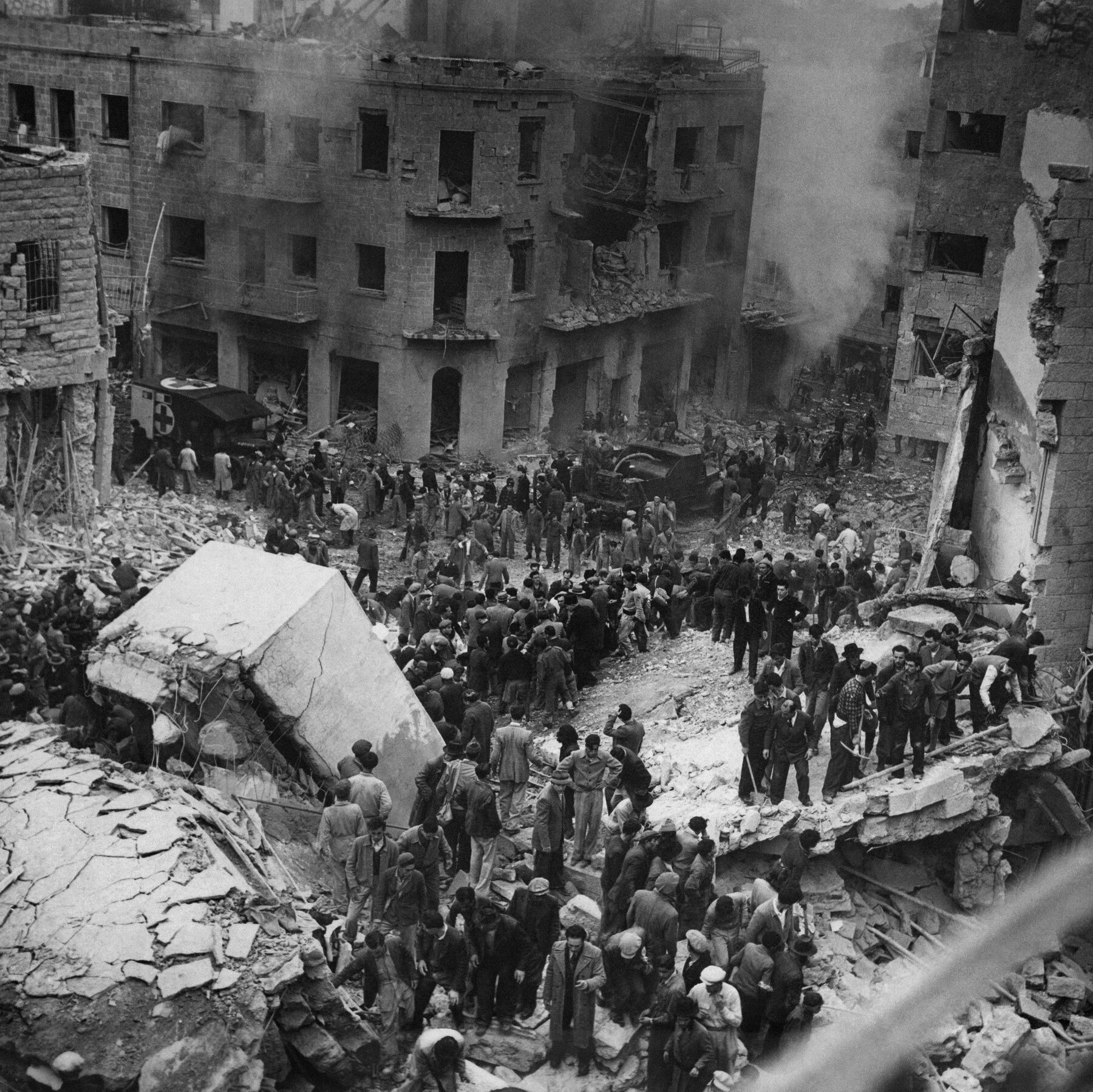
Destruction in Jerusalem caused by the Ben Yehuda Street bombing

On 22 February 1948, supporters of Mohammad Amin al-Husayni, with the help of certain British deserters, organized three attacks against the Jewish community. Using car bombs aimed at the headquarters of the Zionist Palestine Post newspaper, the Ben Yehuda St. market, and the backyard of the Jewish Agency's offices, they killed 22, 53, and 13 Jews respectively, a total of 88 fatalities. Hundreds of others were injured.

In retaliation, Lehi put a landmine on the railroad track in Rehovot on which a train from Cairo to Haifa was travelling, killing 28 British soldiers and injuring 35. This was copied on 31 March, close to Caesarea Maritima, which led to the death of 40 people and injured 60, mostly Arab civilians.

David Ben-Gurion reorganized the Haganah and made conscription obligatory. Every Jew in the country had to receive military training.

=== Allied Powers' policies ===
This situation caused the United States to withdraw its support for the partition plan and instead propose a trusteeship for Palestine in March 1948, thus encouraging the Arab League to believe that the Palestinian Arabs, reinforced by the Arab Liberation Army, could quash the partition plan. The British, on the other hand, decided on 7 February 1948 to support Transjordan's annexation of the Arab part of Palestine.

=== Population evacuations ===
While the Jewish population had received strict orders requiring it to hold its ground everywhere at all costs, the Arab population was more affected by the general conditions of insecurity to which the country was exposed. By the end of March 1984, 100,000 Arabs from the urban upper and middle classes in Haifa, Jaffa and Jerusalem, and from villages in Jewish-dominated areas such as the Jordan Valley, had evacuated Arab centres in the East, or had fled the country altogether.

=== Fighters and arms from abroad ===
As a consequence of funds raised by Golda Meir from sympathisers in the United States, and Stalin's decision to support the Zionist cause, the Jewish representatives of Palestine were able to sign very important armament contracts in the East. Other Haganah agents recovered stockpiles from World War II, which helped improve the army's equipment and logistics. The Jewish Agency had set aside $28 million for foreign arms purchases alone. By comparison, the Arab Higher Committee's total budget at this time amounted to $2,250,000, equivalent to the Haganah's annual budget in prewar times.

Several Arab Liberation Army regiments intervened in Palestine, each active in a variety of distinct sectors around the different coastal towns. They consolidated their presence in Galilee and Samaria. Abd al-Qadir al-Husayni came from Egypt with several hundred men of the Army of the Holy War.

German and Bosnian WWII veterans, including a handful of former intelligence, Wehrmacht, and Waffen SS officers, were among the volunteers fighting for the Palestinian cause. Veterans of WWII Axis militaries were represented in the ranks of the ALA forces commanded by Fawzi al-Qawuqji (who had been awarded an officer's rank in the Wehrmacht during WWII) and in the Mufti's forces, commanded by Abd al-Qadir (who had fought with the Germans against the British in Iraq) and Salama (who trained in Germany as a commando during WWII and took part in a failed parachute mission into Palestine). In addition, roughly 100 to 200 British soldiers and police officers, many of whom had developed bitterness towards the Zionist movement and/or pity for the Palestinians over the course of the British counterinsurgency campaign against the Zionists, deserted to help the Palestinians. In contrast, only 17 deserters fought for the Yishuv.

Benny Morris writes that the Yishuv was more successful in attracting and effectively deploying foreign military professionals than its Arab adversaries. He concludes that the ex-Nazis and Bosnian Muslims recruited by the Palestinians, Egyptians, and Syrians "proved of little significance" to the outcome of the conflict.

=== Death toll ===
In December 1947, the Jewish death toll was estimated at over 200, and, according to Alec Kirkbride, by 18 January 1948, 333 Jews and 345 Arabs had been killed while 643 Jews and 877 Arabs had been injured. The overall death toll between December 1947 and January 1948 (including British personnel) was estimated at 1,000 people, with 2,000 injured.

Ilan Pappé estimates that 400 Jews and 1,500 Arabs were killed by January 1948. Morris says that by the end of March 1948, the Yishuv had suffered about a thousand dead. According to Yoav Gelber, by the end of March, 2,000 were dead and 4,000 wounded. These figures correspond to an average of more than 100 deaths and 200 casualties per week among a population of 2,000,000.

== Intervention of foreign forces in Palestine ==
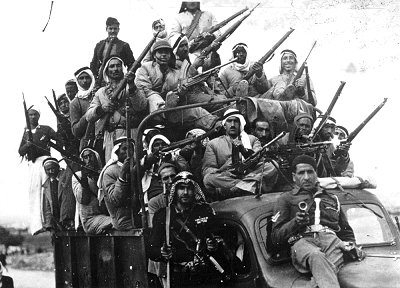
Arab volunteers fighting in Palestine in 1947

Violence kept intensifying with the intervention of military units. Although responsible for law and order up until the end of the mandate, the British did not try to take control of the situation, being more involved in the liquidation of the administration and the evacuation of their troops. Furthermore, the authorities felt that they had lost enough men already in the conflict.

The British either could not or did not want to impede the intervention of foreign forces into Palestine. According to a special report by the UN Special Commission on Palestine:

- During the night of 20–21 January, a force of 700 Syrians in battle dress, well-equipped, with mechanized transport, entered Palestine 'via Transjordan.'
- On 27 January, 'a band of 300 men from outside Palestine, was established in the area of Safed in Galilee and was probably responsible for the intensive heavy weapon and mortar attacks the following week against the settlement of Yechiam.'
- During the night of 29–30 January, a battalion of the Arab Liberation Army, 950 men in 19 vehicles commanded by Fawzi al-Qawuqji, entered Palestine 'via Adam Bridge and dispersed itself around the villages of Nablus, Jenin, and Tulkarem.'

This description corresponds to the entry of Arab Liberation Army troops between 10 January and the start of March:

- The Second regiment of Yarmouk, under the orders of Adib Shishakli entered Galilee via Lebanon on the night of 11–12 January. The battalion passed through Safed and then settled in the village of Sasa. A third of the regiment's fighters were Palestinian Arabs, and a quarter were Syrian.
- The 1st Yarmouk regiment, commanded by Muhammad Tzafa, entered Palestine on the night of 20–21 January, via the Bridge of Damia from Jordan and dispersed around Samaria, where it established its HQ, in the Northern Samarian city of Tubas. The regiment was composed chiefly of Palestinian Arabs and Iraqis.
- The Hittin regiment, commanded by Madlul Abbas, settled in the west of Samaria with its headquarters in Tulkarem.
- The Hussein ibn Ali regiment provided reinforcement in Haifa, Jaffa, Jerusalem, and several other cities.
- The Qadassia regiment were reserves based in Jab'a.

Fawzi al-Qawuqji, Field Commander of the Arab Liberation Army, arrived, according to his own account, on 4 March, with the rest of the logistics and around 100 Bosniak volunteers in Jab'a, a small village on the route between Nablus and Jenin. He established a headquarters there and a training centre for Palestinian Arab volunteers. Alan Cunningham, the British High Commissioner in Palestine, thoroughly protested against the incursions and the fact that "no serious effort is being made to stop incursions." The only reaction came from Alec Kirkbride, who complained to Ernest Bevin about Cunningham's "hostile tone and threats." The British and the information service of Yishuv expected an offensive for 15 February, but it would not take place, seemingly because the Mufti troops were not ready.

In March, an Iraqi regiment of the Arab Liberation Army came to reinforce the Palestinian Arab troops of Salameh in the area around Lydda and Ramleh, while Al-Husayni started a headquarters in Bir Zeit, 10 km to the north of Ramallah. At the same time, a number of North African troops, principally Libyans, and hundreds of members of the Muslim Brotherhood entered Palestine. In March, an initial regiment arrived in Gaza and certain militants among them reached Jaffa.

== Morale of the fighters ==
The Arab combatants' initial victories reinforced morale among them. The Arab Higher Committee was confident and decided to prevent the set-up of the UN-backed partition plan. In an announcement made to the Secretary-General on 6 February, they declared:

The Palestinian Arabs consider any attempt by Jewish people or by whatever power or group of power to establish a Jewish state in an Arab territory to be an act of aggression that will be resisted by force [...]
The prestige of the United Nations would be better served by abandoning this plan and by not imposing such an injustice [...]
The Palestinian Arabs make a grave declaration before the UN, before God and before history that they will never submit to any power that comes to Palestine to impose a partition. The only way to establish a partition is to get rid of them all: men, women, and children.

At the beginning of February 1948, the morale of the Jewish leaders was not high: "distress and despair arose clearly from the notes taken at the meetings of the Mapai party." "The attacks against the Jewish settlements and main roads worsened the direction of the Jewish people, who underestimated the intensity of the Arab reaction."

The situation of the 100,000 Jews situated in Jerusalem was precarious, and supplies to the city, already slim in number, were likely to be stopped. Nonetheless, despite the setbacks suffered, the Jewish forces, in particular Haganah, remained superior in number and quality to those of the Arab forces.

== First wave of Palestinian refugees ==
The high morale of the Arab fighters and politicians was not shared by the Palestinian Arab civilian population. The UN Palestine Commission reported 'Panic continues to increase, however, throughout the Arab middle classes, and there is a steady exodus of those who can afford to leave the country. 'From December 1947 to January 1948, around 70,000 Arabs fled, and, by the end of March, that number had grown to around 100,000.

These people were part of the first wave of Palestinian refugees of the conflict. Mostly the middle and upper classes fled, including the majority of the families of local governors and representatives of the Arab Higher Committee. Non-Palestinian Arabs also fled in large numbers. Most of them did not abandon the hope of returning to Palestine once the hostilities had ended.

== Policies of foreign powers ==
Many decisions were made abroad that had an important influence over the outcome of the conflict.

=== Britain and the Transjordanian choice ===
Britain did not want a Palestinian state led by the Mufti, and opted unofficially instead, on 7 February 1948, to support the annexation of the Arab part of Palestine by Abdullah I of Transjordan. At a meeting in London between the commander of Transjordan's Arab Legion, Glubb Pasha, and Secretary of State for Foreign and Commonwealth Affairs, Ernest Bevin, the two parties agreed that they would facilitate the entry of the Arab Legion into Palestine on 15 May and that the Arab part of Palestine be occupied by it.

They held that the Arab Legion not enter the vicinity of Jerusalem or the Jewish state itself. This option did not envisage a Palestinian Arab state. Although the ambitions of King Abdullah are known, it is not apparent to what extent the authorities of Yishuv, the Arab Higher Committee or the Arab League knew of this decision.

=== United States turnabout ===
In mid-March, after the increasing disorder in Palestine and faced with the fear, later judged unfounded, of an Arab petrol embargo, the US government announced the possible withdrawal of its support for the UN's partition plan and for dispatching an international force to guarantee its implementation. The US suggested that Palestine instead be put under UN supervision. On 1 April, the UN Security Council voted on the US proposal to convoke a special assembly to reconsider the Palestinian problem; the Soviet Union abstained.

This U-turn by the US caused concern and debate among Yishuv authorities. They thought that after the withdrawal of British troops, the Yishuv could not effectively resist the Arab forces without the support of the US. In this context, Elie Sasson, the director of the Arab section of Jewish Agency, and several other personalities, persuaded David Ben-Gurion and Golda Meyerson to advance a diplomatic initiative to the Arabs. The job of negotiation was delegated to Joshua Palmon, who was prohibited from limiting the Haganah's liberty of action but was authorized to declare that "the Jewish people were ready with a truce."

=== Logistical support of the Eastern Bloc ===
In the context of the embargo imposed upon Palestinian belligerents—Jewish and Arab alike—and the dire lack of arms by the Yishuv in Palestine, Soviet ruler Joseph Stalin's decision to breach the embargo and support the Yishuv with arms exported from Czechoslovakia played a role in the war that was differently appreciated. However, Syria also bought arms from Czechoslovakia for the Arab Liberation Army, but the shipment never arrived due to Haganah intervention.

Possible motivations for Stalin's decision include his support of the UN Partition plan, and allowing Czechoslovakia to earn some foreign income after being forced to refuse Marshall Plan assistance.

The extent of this support and the concrete role that it played is up for debate. Figures advanced by historians tend to vary. Yoav Gelber spoke of 'small deliveries from Czechoslovakia arriving by air [...] from April 1948 onwards' whereas various historians have argued that there was an unbalanced level of support in favor of Yishuv, given that the Palestinian Arabs did not benefit from an equivalent level of Soviet support. In any case, the embargo that was extended to all Arab states in May 1948 by the UN Security Council caused great problems to them.

=== Arab leaders' refusal of direct involvement ===
Arab leaders did what they could to avoid being directly involved in support for the Palestinian cause.

At the Arab League summit of October 1947, in Aley, the Iraqi general, Ismail Safwat, painted a realist picture of the situation. He underlined the better organization and greater financial support of the Jewish people in comparison to the Palestinians. He recommended the immediate deployment of the Arab armies at the Palestinian borders, the dispatching of weapons and ammunition to the Palestinians, and the contribution of a million pounds of financial aid to them. His proposals were rejected, other than the suggestion to send financial support, which was not followed up on.

Nonetheless, a techno-military committee was established to coordinate assistance to the Palestinians. Based in Cairo, it was directed by Safwat, who was supported by Lebanese and Syrian officers and representatives of the Higher Arab Committee. A Transjordian delegate was also appointed, but he did not participate in meetings.

At the December 1947 Cairo summit, under pressure by public opinion, the Arab leaders decided to create a military command that united all the heads of all the major Arab states, headed by Safwat. They still ignored his calls for financial and military aid, preferring to defer any decision until the end of the Mandate, but, nevertheless, decide to form the Arab Liberation Army, which would go into action in the following weeks.

On the night of 20–21 January 1948, around 700 armed Syrians entered Palestine via Transjordan. In February 1948, Safwat reiterated his demands, but they fell on deaf ears: the Arab governments hoped that the Palestinians, aided by the Arab Liberation Army, could manage on their own until the International community renounced the partition plan.

== Balance of powers ==
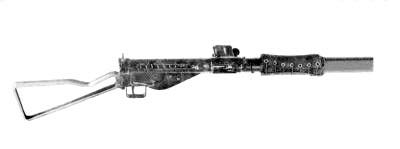
A Sten submachine gun

The Arab Liberation Army was, in theory, financed and equipped by the Arab League. A budget of one million pounds sterling had been promised to them, due to the insistence of Ismail Safwat. In reality, though, funding never arrived, and only Syria truly supported the Arab volunteers in concrete terms. Syria bought from Czechoslovakia a quantity of arms for the Arab Liberation Army but the shipment never arrived due to Hagana force intervention.

According to Lapierre & Collins, on the ground, logistics were completely neglected, and their leader, Fawzi al-Qawuqji, envisaged that his troops survive only on the expenses accorded to them by the Palestinian population. However, Gelber says that the Arab League had arranged the supplies through special contractors. They were equipped with different types of light weapons, light and medium-sized mortars, a number of 75 mm and 105 mm guns, and armoured vehicles but their stock of shells was small.

The situation that the Army of the Holy War and the Palestinian forces were in was worse. They could not rely on any form of foreign support and had to get by on the funds that Mohammad Amin al-Husayni could raise. The troops' armament was limited to what the fighters already had. To make things even worse, they had to be content with arms bought on the black market or pillaged from British warehouses, and, as a result, did not really have enough arms to wage war.

Until March, Haganah suffered also a lack of arms. The Jewish fighters benefitted from a number of clandestine factories that manufactured some light weapons, ammunition and explosives. The one weapon of which there was no shortage was locally produced explosives. However, they had far less than what was necessary to carry out a war: in November, only one out of every three Jewish combatants was armed, rising to two out of three within Palmach.

Haganah sent agents to Europe and to the United States, in order to arm and equip this army. To finance all of this, Golda Meir managed, by the end of December, to collect $25 million through a fundraising campaign set about in the United States to capitalize on American sympathisers to the Zionist cause. Out of the 129 million US dollars raised between October 1947 and March 1949 for the Zionist cause, more than $78 million, over 60%, were used to buy arms and munition.

A leased transport plane was used for the Operation Balak first arms ferry flight from Czechoslovakia on the end of March 1948. At the beginning of April 1948, a shipment of thousands of rifles and hundreds of machine guns arrived at Tel Aviv harbor. With this big shipment, Haganah could supply weapons to a concentrated effort, without taking over the arms of other Jewish territory and risking them being with no weapons. Haganah went into the offensive, although still lacking heavy weapons.

== Reorganisation of Haganah ==
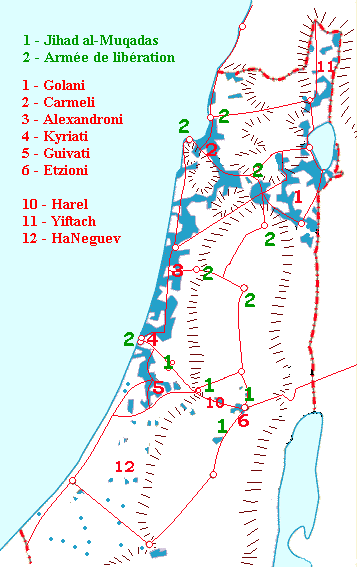
The Theatre of Operation of each Haganah brigade.

After 'having gotten the Jews of Palestine and of elsewhere to do everything that they could, personally and financially, to help Yishuv,' Ben-Gurion's second greatest achievement was his having successfully transformed Haganah from being a clandestine paramilitary organization into a true army. Ben-Gurion appointed Israel Galili to the position of head of the High Command counsel of Haganah and divided Haganah into 6 infantry brigades, numbered 1 to 6, allotting a precise theatre of operation to each one.

Yaakov Dori was named Chief of Staff. Yigael Yadin assumed the responsibility on the ground as chief of Operations. Palmach, commanded by Yigal Allon, was divided into 3 elite brigades, numbered 10–12, and constituted the mobile force of Haganah. Ben-Gurion's attempts to retain personal control over the newly formed IDF lead later in July to The Generals' Revolt.

On 19 November 1947, obligatory conscription was instituted for all men and women aged between 17 and 25. By end of March 21,000 people had been conscripted. On 30 March the call-up was extended to men and single women aged between 26 and 35. Five days later a General Mobilization order was issued for all men under 40.

"From November 1947, the Haganah, (...) began to change from a territorial militia into a regular army. (...) Few of the units had been well trained by December. (...) By March–April, it fielded still under-equipped battalion and brigades. By April–May, the Haganah was conducting brigade size offensive."

== War of the roads and blockade of Jerusalem ==
=== Geographic situation of the Jewish zones ===
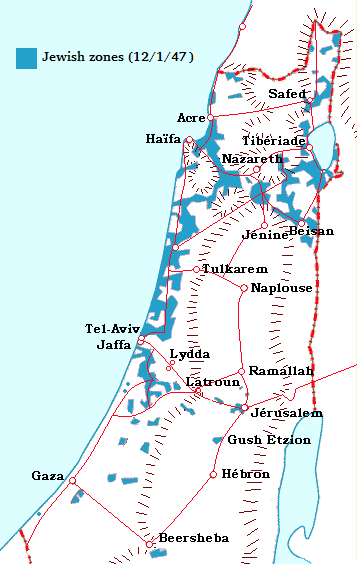
A map of Jewish settlements and roads in Palestine by 1 December 1947

Apart from on the coastline, Jewish yishuvim, or settlements, were very dispersed. Communication between the coastal area (the main area of Jewish settlements) and the peripheral settlements was by road. These road were an easy target for attacks, as most of them passed through or near entirely Arab localities. The isolation of the 100,000 Jewish people in Jerusalem and other Jewish settlements outside the coastal zone, such as kibbutz Kfar Etzion, halfway on the strategic road between Jerusalem and Hebron, the 27 settlements in the southern region of Negev and the settlements to the north of Galilee, were a strategic weakness for the Yishuv.

The possibility of evacuating these difficult to defend zones was considered, but the policy of Haganah was set by David Ben-Gurion. He stated that "what the Jewish people have has to be conserved. No Jewish person should abandon his or her house, farm, kibbutz or job without authorization. Every outpost, every colony, whether it is isolated or not, must be occupied as though it were Tel Aviv itself." No Jewish settlement was evacuated until the invasion of May 1948. Only a dozen kibbutzim in Galilee, and those in Gush Etzion sent women and children into the safer interior zones.

Ben-Gurion gave instructions that the settlements of Negev be reinforced in number of men and goods, in particular the kibbutzim of Kfar Darom and Yad Mordechai (both close to Gaza), Revivim (south of Beersheba), and Kfar Etzion. Conscious of the danger that weighed upon Negev, the supreme command of Haganah assigned a whole Palmach battalion there.

=== Siege of Jerusalem ===
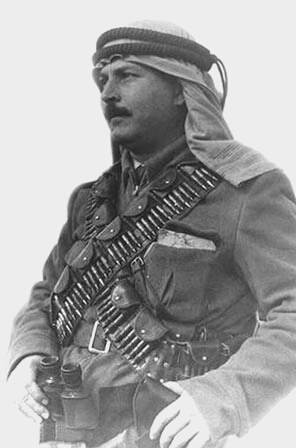
Abd al-Qadir al-Husayni, a prominent military leader during the Palestinian Civil War.

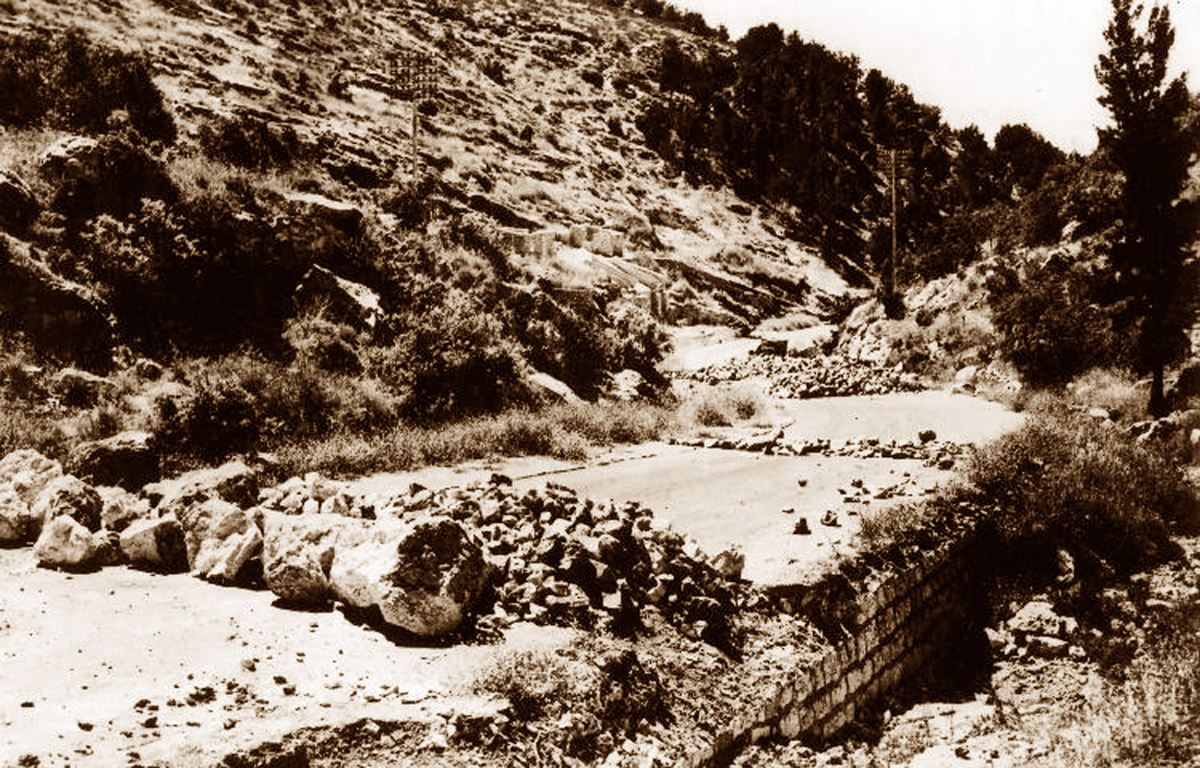
An Arab road block, at the main road to Jerusalem

Jerusalem and the great difficulty of accessing the city became even more critical to its Jewish population, who made up one sixth of the total Jewish population in Palestine. The long and difficult route from Tel Aviv to Jerusalem, after leaving the Jewish zone at Hulda, went through the foothills of Latrun. The 28-kilometre route between Bab al-Wad and Jerusalem took no less than three hours, and the route passed near the Arab villages of Saris, Qaluniya, Al-Qastal, and Deir Yassin.

Abd al-Qadir al-Husayni arrived in Jerusalem with the intent to surround and besiege its Jewish community. He moved to Surif, a village to the southwest of Jerusalem, with his supporters—around a hundred fighters who were trained in Syria before the war and who served as officers in his army, Jihad al-Muqadas, or Army of the Holy War. He was joined by a hundred or so young villagers and Arab veterans of the British Army. His militia soon had several thousand men, and it moved its training quarters to Bir Zeit, a town near Ramallah.

Abd al-Qadir's zone of influence extended down to the area of Lydda, Ramleh, and the Judean Hills where Hasan Salama commanded 1,000 men. Salama, like Abd al-Qadir, had been affiliated with Mufti Haj Amin al Husseini for years, and had also been a commander in the 1936–1939 Arab revolt in Palestine, participated in the Rashid Ali coup of 1941 and the subsequent Anglo-Iraqi War. Salama had re-entered Palestine in 1944 in Operation Atlas, parachuting into the Jordan Valley as a member of a special German—Arab commando unit of the Waffen SS. He coordinated with al-Husayni to execute a plan of disruption and harassment of road traffic in an attempt to isolate and blockade Western (Jewish) Jerusalem.

On 10 December, the first organized attack occurred when ten members of a convoy between Bethlehem and Kfar Etzion were killed.

On 14 January, Abd al-Qadir himself commanded and took part in an attack against Kfar Etzion, in which 1,000 Palestinian Arab combatants were involved. The attack was a failure, and 200 of al-Husayni's men died. Nonetheless, the attack did not come without losses of Jewish lives: a detachment of 35 Palmach men who sought to reinforce the establishment were ambushed and killed.

On 25 January, a Jewish convoy was attacked near the Arab village of al-Qastal. The attack went badly and several villages to the northeast of Jerusalem answered a call for assistance, although others did not, for fear of reprisals. The campaign for control over the roads became increasingly militaristic in nature, and became a focal point of the Arab war effort. After 22 March, supply convoys to Jerusalem stopped, due to a convoy of around thirty vehicles having been destroyed in the gorges of Bab-el-Wad.

On 27 March, an important supply convoy from Kfar Etzion was taken in an ambush in south of Jerusalem. They were forced to surrender all of their arms, ammunition and vehicles to al-Husayni's forces. The Jews of Jerusalem requested the assistance of the United Kingdom after 24 hours of combat. According to a British report, the situation in Jerusalem, where a food rationing system was already in application, risked becoming desperate after 15 May.

The situation in other areas of the country was as critical as the one of Jerusalem. The settlements of Negev were utterly isolated, due to the impossibility of using the Southern coastal road, which passed through zones densely populated by Arabs. On 27 March, a convoy of supplies (the Yehiam convoy) that was intended for the isolated kibbutzim north-west of Galilee was attacked in the vicinity of Nahariya. In the ensuing battle, 42–47 Haganah combatants and around a hundred fighters of the Arab Liberation Army were killed, and all vehicles involved were destroyed.

== Haganah offensive (1 April – 15 May 1948) ==
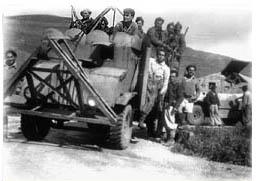
A shielded Jewish convoy during the blockade of the Tel Aviv–Jerusalem road

The second phase of the war, which began in April, marked a huge change in direction, as Haganah moved to the offensive.

In this stage, Arab forces were composed of around 10,000 men among which between 3,000 and 5,000 foreign volunteers serving in the Arab Liberation Army. Haganah and Palmach forces were steadily increasing. In March, they aligned around 15,000 men and in May around 30,000 who were better equipped, trained and organized.

The armed Palestinian groups were roundly defeated, Yishuv took control of some of the principal routes that linked the Jewish settlements, and as a consequence, Jerusalem was able to receive supplies again. Palestinian society collapsed. Many mixed cities were taken by the Haganah as well as Jaffa. A massive exodus was triggered.

=== Plan Dalet ===
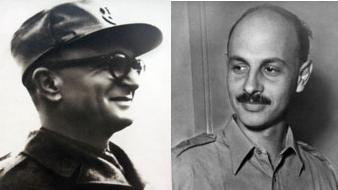
Yaakov Dori, Haganah's Chief of Staff, and his right-hand man, Yigael Yadin, Chief of Operations.

Plan Dalet was finalized on 10 March 1948, under the direction of Yigael Yadin. 75 pages long, it laid down the rules and the objects that were to be followed by Haganah during the second phase of the war. Its principal objective was to secure Yishuv's uninterrupted territorial connections, particularly in response to the war of the roads carried out by Al-Husayni and in preparation for the Arab states' declared intervention. Plan Dalet caused quite a controversy among historians. Some see it as a plan that was primarily defensive and military in nature and a preparation against invasion, whereas others think that the plan was offensive in nature and aimed at conquering as much of Palestine as possible, or enacted with the aim of ethnically cleansing Palestine.

=== Operation Nachshon (2–20 April) ===
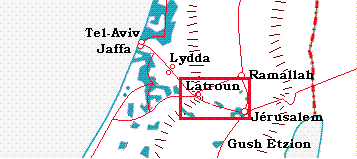
A map of Operation Nachshon's theatre of operations

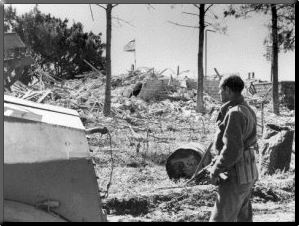
A Haganah soldier in Al-Qastal on 5 April 1948.

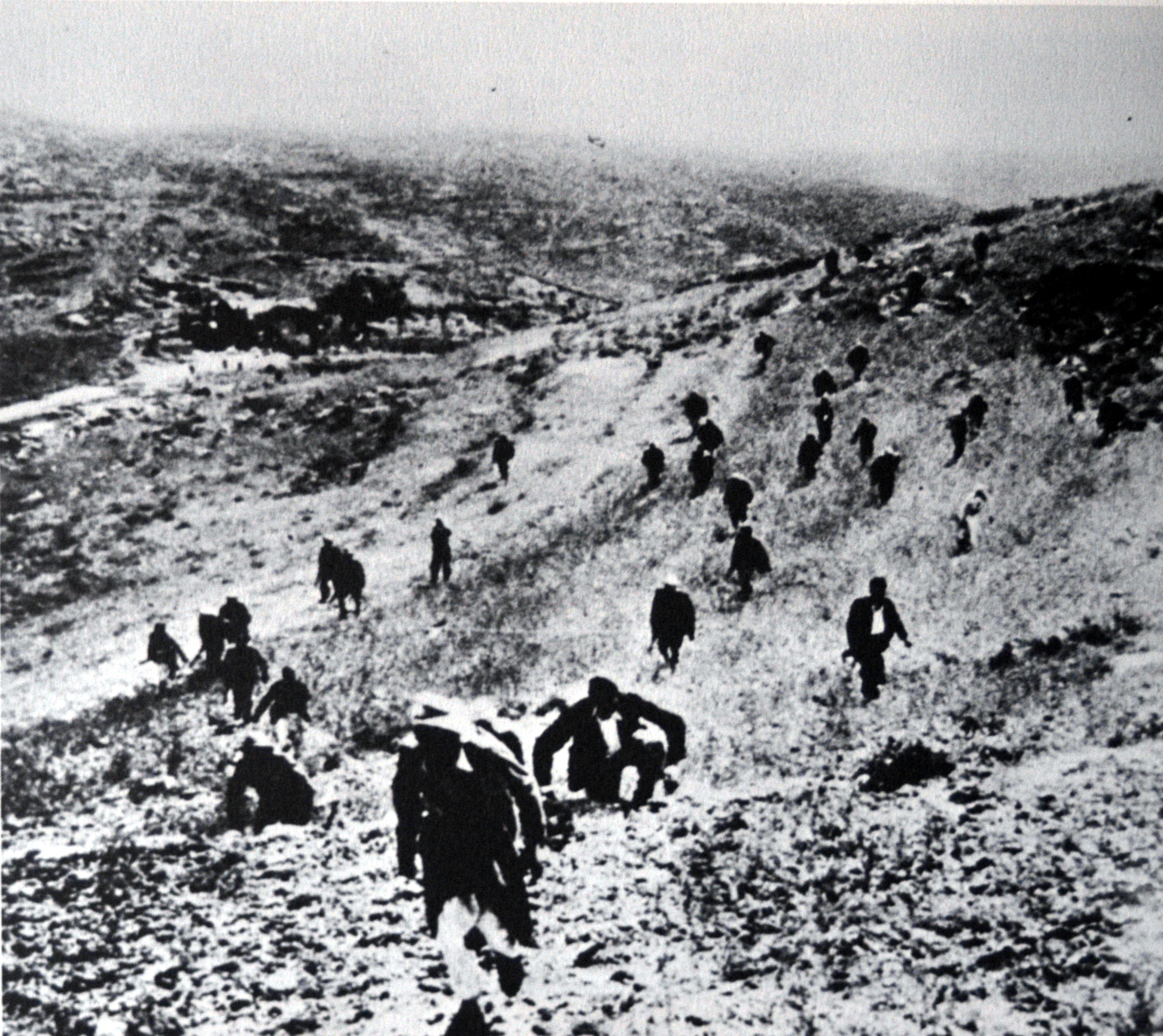
Palestinian irregulars of the Holy War Army, approaching al-Qastal village near Jerusalem to take it back from Palmach.

At the end of March 1948, Husayni's troops prevented supply convoys from reaching Jerusalem. The city was besieged and the Jewish population was forced to adhere to a rationing system. Ben-Gurion decided to launch the operation Nachshon to open up the city and provide supplies to Jerusalem. Operation Nachshon marked the Haganah shift to the offensive, even before launching plan D.

The first orders were given on 2 April 1948 with diversion attacks including Qastel. Between 5–20 April 1500 men from the Givati and Harel brigades took control of the road to Jerusalem and allowed 3 or 4 convoys to reach the city.

The operation was a military success. All the Arab villages that blocked the route were either taken or destroyed, and the Jewish forces were victorious in all their engagements. Nonetheless, not all the objectives of the operation were achieved, since only 1800 tonnes of the 3,000 envisaged were transported to the city, and two months of severe rationing had to be assumed.

Abd al-Qadir al-Husayni was killed during the night of 7–8 April, in the midst of the battles taking place in Al-Qastal. The loss of this charismatic Palestinian leader 'disrupted the Arab strategy and organization in the area of Jerusalem.' His successor, Emil Ghuri, changed tactics: instead of provoking a series of ambushes throughout the route, he had a huge road block erected at Bab al-Wad, and Jerusalem was once again isolated as a consequence.

Operation Nachshon exposed the poor military organization of the Palestinian paramilitary groups. Due to lack of logistics, particularly food and ammunition, they were incapable of maintaining engagements that were more than a few hours away from their permanent bases.

Faced with these events, the Arab Higher Committee asked Alan Cunningham to allow the return of the Mufti, the only person capable of redressing the situation. Despite obtaining permission, the Mufti did not get to Jerusalem. His declining prestige cleared the way for the expansion of the influence of the Arab Liberation Army and of Fawzi Al-Qawuqji in the Jerusalem area.

In April, Yishuv forces began to resort to biological warfare in a top-secret operation called 'Cast Thy Bread', whose aim was to prevent the return of Palestinians to the villages Yishuv forces had conquered, and, as the practice reached beyond the key Tel-Aviv-Jerusalem lines, make conditions difficult for any Arab armies that might retake territory. This consisted in poisoning village wells. In the final months of the ensuing 1948 Arab-Israeli war, as Israel gained the upper hand, orders were apparently given to extend the use of biological agents against the Arab states themselves.

=== Battle of Mishmar HaEmek (4–15 April) ===
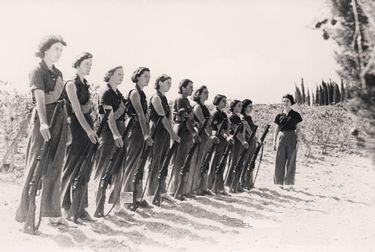
Women training at Mishmar HaEmek

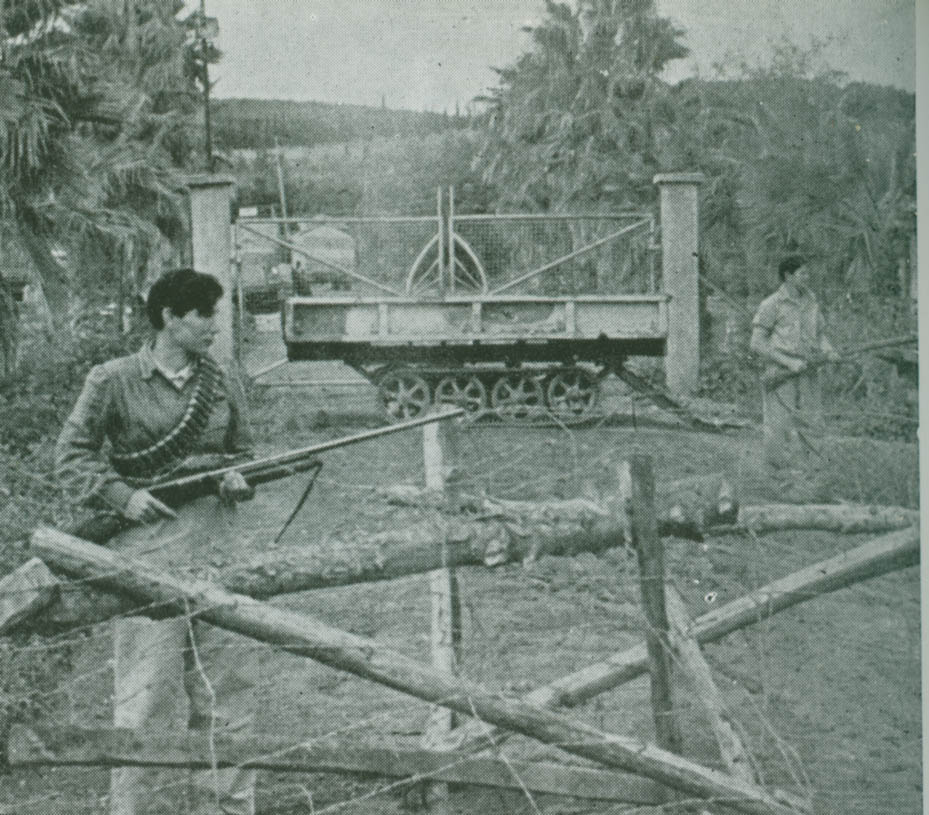
Jewish soldiers at the entry of the Mishmar Ha'emek, 1948

Mishmar HaEmek is a kibbutz that was founded by Mapam in 1930, in the Jezreel Valley, close to the road between Haifa and Jenin that passes the Megiddo kibbutz. It is situated in a place that Haganah officers considered to be on one of the most likely axes of penetration for a 'major Arab attack' against the Yishuv.

On 4 April, the Arab Liberation Army launched an attack on the kibbutz with the support of artillery. The attack was fought off by the members of the kibbutz, who were supported by Haganah soldiers. The artillery fire that had almost totally destroyed the kibbutz was stopped by a British column, who arrived on the scene by order of General MacMillan, and, on 7 April, Fawzi Al-Qawuqji accepted a 24-hour ceasefire, but required that the kibbutz be surrendered. The inhabitants of the kibbutz evacuated their children, and, after having consulted Tel Aviv, refused to surrender.

On 8 or 9 April, Haganah prepared a counter-offensive. Yitzhak Sadeh was put in charge of operations, with the order to 'clean out' the region. The battle lasted until 15 April. Sadeh's men besieged all the villages around the kibbutz, and the Arab Liberation Army had to retreat to its bases in Jabba. The majority of the inhabitants of the region fled, but those who did not were either imprisoned or expelled to Jenin. The villages were plundered by some Kibbutznikim and razed to the ground with explosives with accordance to Plan Dalet.

According to Morris, the Arab Liberation Army soldiers were demoralized by reports of the Deir Yassin massacre and the death of Abd al-Qadir al-Husayni. Throughout battle, they had generally been forced to withdraw and to abandon the people of the villages. Dominique Lapierre and Larry Collins report that Joshua Palmon, head of a unit of 6 men, failed to seize invaluable pieces of artillery, and they depict the events as a débâcle for which Fawzi Al-Qawuqji offered extravagant excuses, declaring in particular that the Jewish forces has 120 tanks, six squadrons of fighter and bomber aircraft and that they were supported by a regiment of Russian volunteers.

According to Morris, "according to Ben-Gurion, some 640 Haganah soldiers had faced about twenty-five hundred ALA troops, with superior firepower—and bested them". When the battle finished, Palmach forces continued 'cleaning' operations until 19 April, destroying several villages and forcing those who inhabited them to flee. Some villages were also evacuated under the instruction of Arab authorities.

In May, Irgun engaged in several operations in the region, razing a number of villages and killing some of their inhabitants, as did some detachments from the Golani and Alexandroni brigades.

=== Deir Yassin massacre ===
Deir Yassin is a village located 5 kilometres west of Jerusalem. On 9 April 1948, independently of operation Nachshon, around 120 Irgun and Lehi men attacked the village and ran into resistance, capturing it after a fierce battle with Palmach help. The Irgun and Lehi lost 4 dead and 35 wounded. Between 100 and 120 inhabitants of the village were killed in the attack, mostly civilians. The Haganah had approved the attack and assisted in it.

The operation led to indignation from the international community, the more so since the press of the time reported that the death toll was 254. Ben-Gurion roundly condemned it, as did the principal Jewish authorities: the Haganah, the Great Rabbinate and the Jewish Agency for Israel, who sent a letter of condemnation, apology and condolence to King Abdullah I of Transjordan.

According to Morris, "the most important immediate effect of the atrocity and the media campaign that followed it was how one started to report the fear felt in Palestinian towns and villages, and, later, the panicked fleeing from them." Another important repercussion was within the Arab population of neighbouring Arab states, which, once again, increased its pressure on the representatives of these states to intervene and come to the aid of the Palestinian Arabs.

=== Hadassah medical convoy massacre ===
On 13 April, partly in revenge for the Deir Yassin massacre, a convoy that was driving towards Jerusalem's Hadassah Hospital on Mount Scopus was attacked by hundreds of Arabs. In the seven-hour battle 79 Jews were killed including doctors and patients. Thirteen British soldiers were present, but they stood by, only putting in a perfunctory attempt at intervention in the last moments of the massacre.

Lieutenant-Colonel Jack Churchill was present at the scene, and later testified that he had attempted to assist the Hadassah convoy by radioing for support, only for the request to be turned down.

=== Battle of Ramat Yohanan and the defection of the Druze ===
Following the 'fiasco' of Mishmar HaEmek, Fawzi Al-Qawuqji ordered the Druze regiment of the Arab Liberation Army into action, to carry out diversion operations. Druze soldiers took position in several Arab villages 12 kilometres to the east of Haifa, whence they occasionally attacked traffic and Jewish settlements, including Ramat Yohanan.

The Kibbutznikim and the Haganah soldiers that supported them forced back their attacks and razed the villages from which they launched their attacks. Having run out of ammunition, the Druze withdrew to their base in Shefa-'Amr, with one hundred casualties. After an initial failure, a battalion-sized Carmeli force on the night of 15–16 April overran the two villages. The Druze Battalion, on 16 April assaulted the Carmeli positions nine times but the Carmeli troops fought back. By afternoon, the exhausted Druze troops retreated. A Haganah report praised "the well trained and very brave enemy forces."

The Druze had already made contact on several occasions with Yishuv agents and following their defeat at Ramat Yohanan, the Druze officers offered to defect and to join the ranks of Haganah. This proposition was discussed with Yigael Yadin, who refused the proposal but suggested that they could help to carry out sabotage operations behind the backs of the Arabs and to influence their comrades into deserting the army. By the start of May, 212 Wahab soldiers deserted. Taking into account the attitude of his men, Wahab met with Jewish liaison officers on 9 May and agreed to cooperate with Haganah. The two parties avoided clashes, and Wahab created a neutral enclave in the centre of Galilee. Wahab's army did not respond to calls for it to help fight Haganah's occupation of Acre, and avoided being present while Haganah occupied the police fortress of Shefa-'Amr during its evacuation by the British.

The position that the Druze took influenced their fate after the war. Given the good relationship between the Druze and Yishuv from 1930 onwards despite their collaboration with the Arab Higher Council and the Arab League, Ben-Gurion insisted that the Druze, as well as the Circassians and the Maronites benefit from a different position to that of the other Arabs.

=== Siege of mixed localities ===
In the context of Plan Dalet, mixed urban centres, or those on the borders of the Jewish state, were attacked and besieged by Jewish forces. Tiberias was attacked on 10 April and fell six days later; Haifa fell on 23 April, after only one day of combat (Operation Bi'ur Hametz), and Jaffa was attacked on 27 April but fell only after the British abandoned it (Operation Hametz). Safed and Beisan (Operation Gideon) fell on 11 May and 13 May respectively, within the framework of Operation Yitfah, and Acre fell on 17 May, within the framework of Operation Ben-Ami.

The Arab inhabitants of these towns fled or were expelled en masse. In these 6 cities, only 13,000 of the total of 177,000 Arab inhabitants remained by the end of May. This phenomenon ricocheted also in the suburbs and the majority of the zone's Arab villages.

Despite the deteriorating situation for the Arabs, a representative of the Arab Higher Committee Representative stated to UN Security Council on April 16 that the Arabs would reject any ceasefire that does not undo the Partition plan.

=== Operation Yiftah (20 April – 24 May) ===
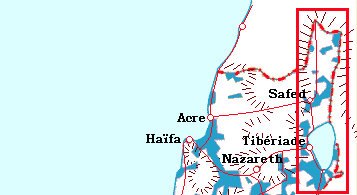
A map of Operation Yiftah's theatre of operations

The Galilee Panhandle, a zone in northeastern Galilee, between the Lake Tiberias and Metula, was the Jewish-controlled area that was the most distant and isolated from the area most densely populated by Jews, the coastal plain. The presence of the Lebanese border to the north, the Syrian border to east and the Arab presence in the rest of Galilee made it a probable target for intervention of the Arab armies. Within the framework of the Dalet plan, Yigael Yadin entrusted Yigal Allon, commander of the Palmach, with the responsibility of managing Operation Yiftah, whose objectives were to control all the aforementioned area and consolidate it ahead of the Arab attack that was planned for 15 May.

Allon was in charge the 1st and 3rd Palmach battalions, which had to face the populace of Safed and several dozen Arab villages. The situation was made more problematic by the presence of the British, although they began their evacuation of the area. According to his analysis, it was essential that they empty the zone of any Arab presence to completely protect themselves; the exodus would also encumber the roads that the Arab forces would have to penetrate.

On 20 April, Allon launched a campaign that mixed propaganda, attacks, seizing control of strongholds that the British had abandoned, and destroying conquered Arab villages. On 1 May, a counter-offensive was launched by Arab militiamen against Jewish settlements but was ultimately unsuccessful. On 11 May, Safed fell, and the operation finished on 24 May after the villages of the valley of Hula were burnt down. Syrian forces' planned offensive in the area failed and, by the end of June, Galilee panhandle from Tiberias to Metula, incorporating Safed, was emptied of all its Arab population.

=== Meeting of Golda Meir and King Abdullah I of Transjordan (10 May) ===
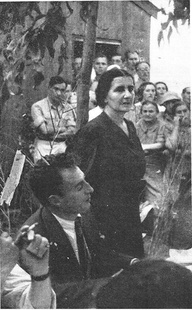
Golda Meir in 1943

On 10 May, Golda Meir and Ezra Danin secretly went to Amman, to the palace of King Abdullah to discuss the situation with him. The situation that Abdullah found himself in was difficult. On one hand, his personal ambitions, the promises made by the Yishuv in November 1947 and the British approval of these promises pushed him to consider annexing the Arab part of Palestine without intervening against the future state of Israel. On the other hand, the pressure exerted by his people in reaction to the massacre of Deir Yassin, combined with their feelings with regard to the Palestinian exodus and his agreements with other members of the Arab League pushed him to be more strongly involved in the war against Israel. He also found himself in a position of power, having the benefit of military support from not only the Arab League, but the British. In his diary, Ben-Gurion wrote about Golda Meir's reaction to the meeting:

We met [on 10 May] amicably. He was very worried and looks terrible. He did not deny that there had been talk and understanding between us about a desirable arrangement, namely that he would take the Arab part [of Palestine]. (...) But Abdullah had said that he could now, on 10 May, only offer the Jews "autonomy" within an enlarged Hashemite kingdom. He added that while he was not interested in invading the areas allocated for Jewish statehood, the situation was volatile. But he voiced the hope that Jordan and the Yishuv would conclude a peace agreement once the dust had settled.

Historical analyses of the motivations and conclusions of this meeting differ. According to Dominique Lapierre and Larry Collins – as well as Israeli historiographers – the intention behind the Yishuv's negotiation was to obtain a peace treaty and avoid an attack by Arab forces. At that time, the balance of power was not favourable for them, but Meir did not manage to convince the King.

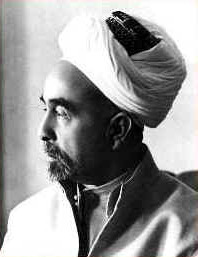
King Abdullah of Transjordan

According to Morris, Abdullah 'reconsidered the promises that he made in November to not be opposed to the partition plan,' but left Meir with the impression that he would make peace with the Jewish state once the civil war had finished.

Avi Shlaim spoke of a 'tacit' agreement to prevent the division of Palestine with the Palestinians, arguing the idea that there was a collusion between the Hashemite Kingdom and Yishuv. The historian Yoav Gelber, however, rejected this idea and devoted an entire work to dismounting it.

Pierre Razoux indicated that 'the majority of experts consider it probable' that Ben-Gurion and King Abdullah had an understanding over dividing Palestine, and that only the pressure from the Arab states on Abdullah constrained him from following up on his promise. According to Razoux, this idea explains the attitude of the British, who, following this plan, would thereby fulfill the promises made by Arthur Balfour to the Yishuv and the Hashemite empire at the same time. He states that the presence of Arab Legion troops, before 15 May, near strategic positions held by the British is in this way easy to understand.

Ilan Pappé stressed that neither Abdullah's ministers, nor the Arab world itself, seemed to be privy to the discussions held between him and the Yishuv, even if his ambitions on Palestine were widely known. He also stated that Sir Alec Kirkbride and Glubb Pasha thought at the time that, at the very least, Azzam Pasha, the Secretary of the Arab League, must have known about Abdullah's double game.

It is certain, on the other hand, that Golda Meir and King Abdullah did not come to an agreement on the status of Jerusalem. On 13 May, the Arab Legion took Kfar Etzion, strategically located halfway along the road between Hebron and Jerusalem. On 17 May, Abdullah ordered Glubb Pasha, commander of the Arab Legion, to launch an attack against the Holy City.

=== Kfar Etzion massacre ===
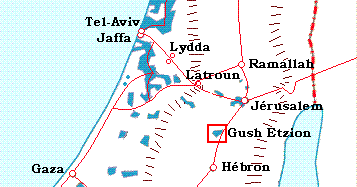
The location of Gush Etzion, highlighted in red

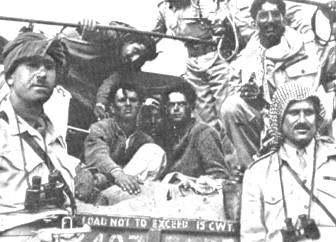
Jewish prisoners taken after the fall of Gush Etzion

Kfar Etzion is a group of four settlements established on the strategic route between Hebron and Jerusalem, right in the middle of Arab inhabited territory. It had 400 inhabitants at the end of 1947. After the adoption of Resolution 181(II), it was the object of Arab attacks. Ben-Gurion reinforced it on 7 December, protecting it with a Palmach division, but on 8 January, he authorized the evacuation of the women and children of the settlements.

After 26 March, the last date on which a supply convoy successfully reached it, despite heavy losses of life, the defenders were completely isolated.

On 12 May, Arab Legion units started to attack the settlements. The motivations advanced include their desire to protect one of their last supply convoys before the embargo took effect, which had to travel down the road by Kfar Etzion. Another theory is that the block of settlements obstructed the deployment of the Legion in the area around Hebron, whose attack was one of Abdullah's principal objectives.

External defences fell quickly, and, on 13 May, the first kibbutz was captured. Those who were taken prisoner were massacred; only four survived. Of the 131 defenders, 127, including 21 women, were killed, or massacred after they surrendered. The other three establishments surrendered, and the kibbutzim were first plundered, then razed to the ground. In March 1949, 320 prisoners from the Etzion settlements were released from the "Jordan POW camp at Mafrak", including 85 women.

The events that took place at Kfar Etzion made apparent the limitations of the policy prohibiting evacuation. Although it was effective during civil war, when facing militias, isolated Jewish settlements could not resist the firepower of a regular army, and an evacuation could have made it possible to avoid the captivity or death of those who defended the settlements.

According to Yoav Gelber, the fall and massacre of Kfar Etzion influenced Ben-Gurion's decision to engage the Arab Legion on its way to Jerusalem, although the Haganah General Staff were divided about whether the Legion should be challenged inside Jerusalem itself as such a move could harm the Jews in the city. Ben-Gurion left the final decision to Shaltiel. The battle for Jerusalem was thus set in motion.

=== Jerusalem: Operations Yevusi and Kilshon ("Pitchfork") (13–18 May) ===
Jewish fighters in Katamon

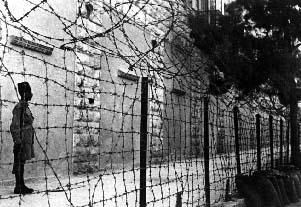
The Jerusalem "Bevingrad" zone, centre of the British security operations

Operation Yevusi lasted two weeks, from 22 April 1948 to 3 May 1948. Not all objectives were achieved before the British enforced a cease-fire. A Palmach force occupied the strategically located San Simon monastery in Katamon. Arab irregulars attacked the monastery and a heavy battle evolved. Both sides had a lot of wounded and killed fighters. The Palmach considered a retreat while the wounded fighters would blow themselves up, but then it was realized that the Arab force was exhausted and could not continue the fighting. As a result, the Arab residents left the suburb and the southern besieged Jewish suburbs were released.

The Haganah intended to capture the Old City during the final days of the Mandate. Its attacks on the seam between East and West Jerusalem from 13 to 18 May (known as Operation Kilshon) were planned as the initial phase of this conquest.

In Jerusalem, the British held several strategically located security zones named "Bevingrads", at its centre. The city's radio station, telephone exchange and government hospital were located there, along with a number of barracks and the Notre Dame hostel, which dominated the city. One of the main objectives of Operation Kilshon was to take control of these zones of strategic importance while the British withdrew. On 13 May the Haganah extended its control of the Old City's Jewish Quarter and on 14th (having obtained the precise schedule of the evacuation with British complicity) took control of the Bevingrads, including the central post office and the Russian Church compound at 04:00. They surprised the Arab troops, who offered no resistance.

A secondary objective of Operation Kilshon was to simultaneously create a continuous frontline between the various isolated Jewish localities. For this aim, Brigadier General David Shaltiel, Haganah's former envoy to Europe, was deployed along with a troop of 400 Haganah soldiers and 600 militia soldiers. Emil Ghuri, the new leader of the Army of the Holy War, also envisaged taking these districts and mobilized 600 soldiers for the mission, but prepared no specific operation.

The secondary aim was also successful. In the North of the city, Jewish forces seized Arab-populated Sheikh Jarrah, made a connection with Mount Scopus, and took the villages surrounding the American colony. In the South, they ensured the connection of the German and Greek colonies with Talpiot and Ramat Rahel, after having taken the Allenby barracks. A Palmach unit even re-established contact with the Jewish district in the Old City via the Zion Gate.

The irregular Arabic forces were rendered impotent and yielded to panic, calling the situation hopeless and announcing the imminent fall of the city.

=== Operation Ben-Ami (13–22 May) ===
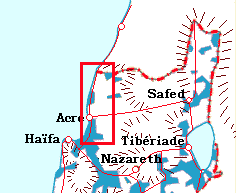
A map of Operation Ben-Ami's theatre of operations

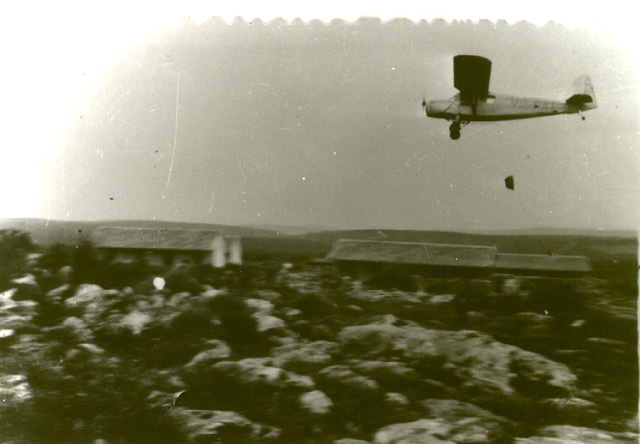
A Haganah plane dropping supplies to besieged Yehiam, January 1948

Within the framework of Plan Dalet, Yigael Yadin intended to make a breakthrough in the west of Galilee, wherein a number of isolated Jewish settlements were situated. This zone, which covers the land from Acre all the way to the Lebanese border, was allocated to the Arabs by the Partition plan, but was on the road through which Lebanese forces intended to enter into Palestine.

The command of this operation was entrusted to Moshe Carmel, head of the Carmeli brigade. It consisted of two phases: the first began on the evening of 13 May, when a column of Haganah's armoured vehicles and lorries advanced along the coast with no resistance. The forces of the Arab Liberation Army fled without entering battle, and the first phase of the operation finished when Acre was taken on 18 May. In the second phase, from 19 to 21 May, troops went as far as the Yehi'am kibbutz by the Lebanese border, connecting it and conquering and destroying a number of Arab villages on the way.

=== Main wave of the Palestinian Arab exodus ===
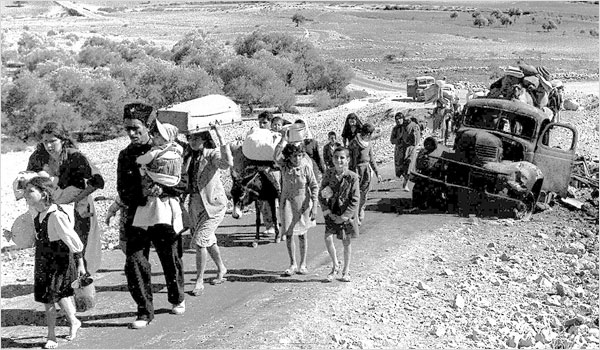
Palestinian Arab refugees in 1948

Haganah's move to offensive operations during the second phase of the war was accompanied by a huge exodus that involved 350,000 Arab refugees, adding to the 100,000 displaced during the First wave. The term 'Palestinian exodus' is often used to refer to both these and two subsequent waves. These two waves gained a considerable amount of press interest and were widely relayed in the press of the time, more so than most other Palestine-related events.

The causes of and responsibility for this exodus are highly controversial topics among commentators on the conflict and even historians who specialize in this era. Among the various possible causes, Efraim Karsh attributes the exodus mainly to Arab authorities' instructions to escape, whereas others argue that a policy of expulsion had been organized by the Yishuv authorities and implemented by Haganah. Others yet reject these two assumptions and see the exodus as the cumulative effect of all the civil war's consequences.

=== Preparations made by the Arab League ===
During the last meeting of the Arab League in February 1948, the Arab leaders expressed their convictions in the capacity of the Arab Liberation Army to help the Palestinians and to force the international community to give up on the UN-backed partition plan. The following summit took place in Cairo on 10 April, with the situation having clearly developed with the death of Al-Husayni and the debacle at Mishmar Ha'emek.

Once again, Ismail Safwat called for the immediate deployment of the Arab state armies at the borders of Palestine, and for the need to go beyond the established policy of participating in little more than small-scale raids towards taking part in large-scale operations. For the first time, the Arab leaders discussed the possibility of intervening in Palestine.

Syria and Lebanon declared themselves ready to intervene immediately, but King Abdullah refused to let the Arab Legion forces intervene immediately in favour of the Palestinians, a move which irritated the Secretary-General of the League, who declared that Abdallah only cedes to the British diktat.

Nonetheless, Abdullah declared himself ready to send the Legion to assist the Palestinian cause after 15 May. In response, Syria insisted that the Egyptian army also take part, and, in spite of the opposition of Egypt's prime minister, King Farouk responded favourably to the Syrian request, but due to his aim of curbing the Jordanians' hegemonic goals rather than his desire to help the Palestinians.

Later on, following the visit of several Palestinian dignitaries in Amman, and despite the opposition of Syria and the Mufti, Haj Amin al-Husseini, Azzam Pasha accepted Abdullah's proposition and sent Ismail Safwat to Amman to organize a coordination between the Arab Liberation Army and Jordan's Arab Legion. It was decided that command over the operations would be reserved for King Abdullah, and that the Iraqis would deploy a brigade in Transjordan to prepare for intervention on 15 May.

On 26 April, the 'intention to occupy Palestine' was officially announced at the Transjordanian parliament and the Jewish people were 'invited to place themselves beneath King Abdullah's jurisdiction.' The intention to spare their lives was also promised. Yishuv perceived this declaration as being one of war and encourages the Western world to pressure the King, through diplomatic means, to prevent his intervention.

On 30 April, Jordanians, Egyptians and Iraqis disputed the command of Abdullah. Abdullah received the honorary title of Commander-in-Chief, while the Iraqi general, Aldine Nur Mahmud, was named Chief of Staff. Despite this show of unity, it was agreed that each army would act independent of each other in the theatre of operations.

On 4 May, the Iraqi task force arrived at Mafraq. It was composed of a regiment of armoured tanks, a regiment of mechanized infantry, and twenty-four artillery weapons, and included 1500 men. The Egyptians formed two brigades, deploying around 700 men into the Sinai. The Syrians could not put together a better force, whereas the Lebanese announced that they could not take part in military operations on 10 May.

It was only two days before, on 8 May, that the British Foreign Office was certain of the Arab invasion. Whereas British analysts considered that all Arab armies, except the Arab Legion, were not prepared for the engagements to come, the Egyptian officers claimed that their advance would be 'a parade with the least risk,' and that their army 'would be in Tel Aviv after just two weeks.'

The state of preparation of the army was such that they did not even have maps of Palestine. At the time, the final plans of invasion had not even been established yet. British leaders tried in vain to make the Arab leaders reconsider their decision, and Ismail Safwat resigned in indifference, but the Arab states seemed resolute. On 15 May 1948, the Arab League announced officially that it would intervene in Palestine to guarantee the security and right to self-determination of the inhabitants of Palestine in an independent state.

== Results and aftermath ==
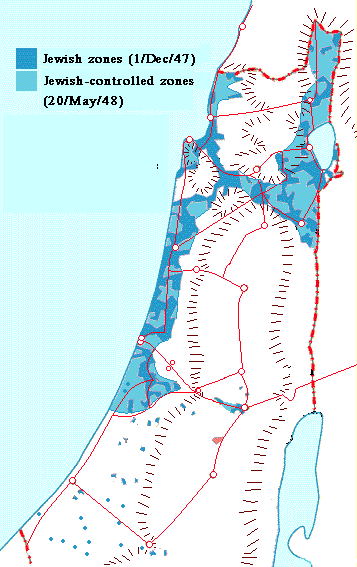
Zones controlled by Yishuv by 20 May 1948, with comparison to zones held some five months earlier.

According to Benny Morris, the result of these five and a half months of fighting was a "decisive Jewish victory". On one side, the "Palestinian Arab military power was crushed" and most of the population in the combat zones was fleeing or had been driven out. On the other side, the "Haganah transformed from a militia into an army" and succeeded "in consolidating its hold on a continuous strip of territory embracing the Coastal Plain, the Jezreel Valley, and the Jordan Valley." The Yishuv proved it had the capability to defend itself, persuading the United States and the remainder of the world to support it and the "victory over the Palestinian Arabs gave the Haganah the experience and self-confidence [...] to confront [...] the invading armies of the Arab states."

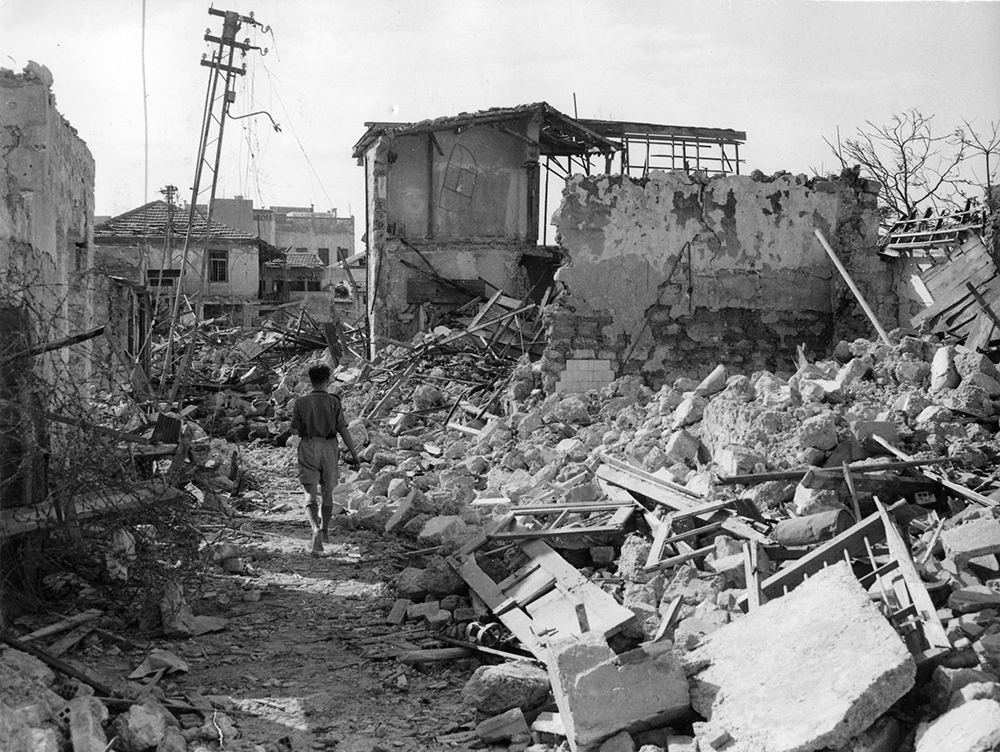
Destroyed buildings in the Manshiya quarter of Jaffa, May 1948

According to Yoav Gelber, during the six weeks between the Haganah offensive on 1 April and the invasion of the Arab armies, the Arabs were defeated in almost every front. The Jewish forces captured four cities (Tiberias, Jaffa, Safed, and Haifa) and 190 villages; most of their residents fled. The refugees flooded Samaria, central Galilee, Mount Hebron region, Gaza region, as well as Transjordan, Lebanon, and southern Syria. With the defeat of the Palestinian forces and the ALA, the Arab League saw no other option than to invade at the end of the British Mandate. The process of deciding to invade and preparing for the attack began two or three weeks before the end of the Mandate, when the level of the defeat was revealed and it was clear the ALA could not prevent it.

Although the Haganah was somewhat poorly armed, its offensive of the last weeks went well, because Arab villages did not come to the help of their neighboring Arab villages or towns. Moreover, only a few young Arab men from untouched areas (e.g. Nablus, Hebron) participated in the fighting in Jerusalem, Haifa, etc. Anwar Nusseibeh, a supporter of the Mufti, said the Mufti refused to issue arms to anyone except his political supporters and only recruited his supporters for the forces of the Holy War Army. This partially accounts for the absence of an organized Arab force and for the insufficient amount of arms, which plagued the Arab defenders of Jerusalem.

On 14 May 1948, David Ben-Gurion, on behalf of the Jewish leadership, declared the establishment of the State of Israel. The 1948 Palestine war entered its second phase with the intervention of the Arab state armies and the beginning of the 1948 Arab–Israeli War.

== See also ==
- List of modern conflicts in the Middle East
