= Army of the Holy War =

Palestinian Arab irregular force active during the 1947–1949 Palestine war

- جيش الجهاد المقدس; Jaysh al-Jihād al-Muqaddas
- Palestinian flag of 1938
- Leaders: Abd al-Qadir al-Husayni; Hasan Salama
- Founded: December 1947
- Dates active: 1947–1948
- Dissolved: May 1949
- Country: (All-Palestine Protectorate) Palestinian Arabs (All-Palestine Protectorate) All-Palestine
- Allegiance: Arab High Committee
- Headquarters: Bir Zeit, Palestine
- Active regions: Mandatory Palestine
- Ideology: Palestinian nationalism Arab nationalism Pan-Arabism; Anti-Zionism; Islamism
- Size: At least 1,306

The Army of the Holy War or Holy War Army (Arabic: جيش الجهاد المقدس; Jaysh al-Jihād al-Muqaddas) was a Palestinian Arab irregular force in the 1947–1948 civil war in Mandatory Palestine led by Abd al-Qadir al-Husayni and Hasan Salama. The force has been described as Husayni's "personal" army. The Arab League set up the Arab Salvation Army (Jaysh al-Inqadh al-Arabi) as a counter to the Army of the Holy War while, in practice, the Arab governments prevented thousands of volunteers from joining either force.

Abd al-Qadir al-Husayni arrived in the Jerusalem sector in December 1947 and by March 1948 had about 128 men. He established his headquarters at Bir Zeit and started to conduct a blockade of Jerusalem by attacking the Jewish convoys to the city. Hasan Salama, with 950 men of the Jihad and 228 irregulars, took responsibility for the operations in the Lydda and Ramle sectors, at the entry of the Tel Aviv-Jerusalem road.

The Army of the Holy War had over 50,000 Palestinian Arabs available for local defense but a force of only 5,000 to 10,000, both foreign fighters from Arab states and Palestinian Arab militiamen, available to be sent where needed during the 1947–1949 Palestine war.

Husayni was killed during the battle for control of Qastal Hill on the Tel Aviv-Jerusalem road, on 8 April 1948. His forces captured Qastal from the Haganah, which had occupied the village at the start of Operation Nachshon six days earlier with a force of about 100 men. They retreated to the Jewish settlement of Motza. Palmach troops recaptured the village on the night of 8–9 April; most of the houses were blown up and the hill became a command post. Husayni's death was a factor in the loss of morale among his forces.

When the All-Palestine Protectorate was formed on 22 September 1948, during the 1948 Arab-Israeli War, it revived the Holy War Army, with the declared aim of "liberating Palestine". However, the government had no money of its own, and operated only under the supervision of Egypt, and was generally ineffective.

In October 1948, Jordan gave an order to its forces, the Arab Legion, to surround and forcibly disarm various units of the Holy War Army.

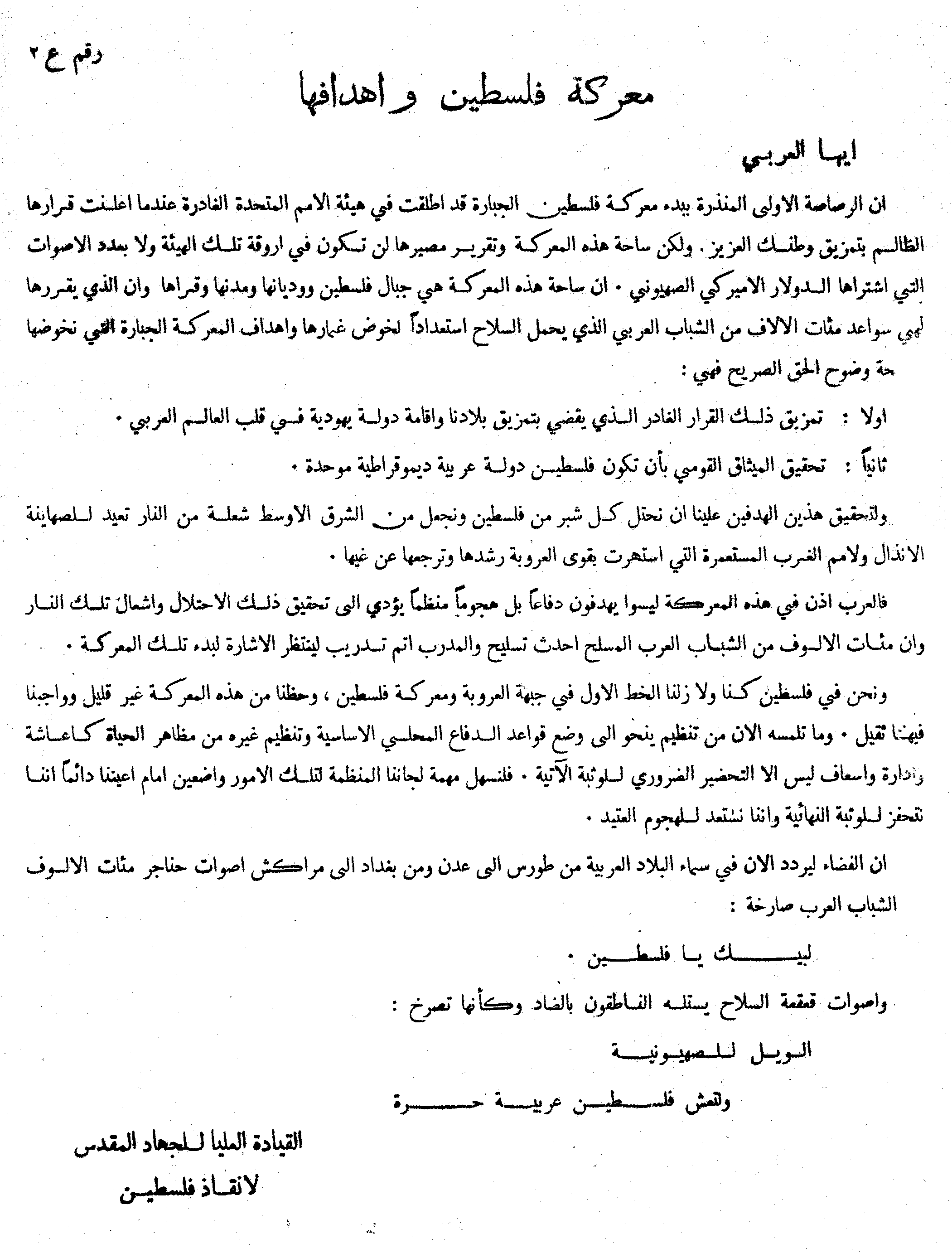
A leaflet, distributed after the U.N. partition resolution, by the Mufti High Command, which calls the Arabs to attack and conquer all of Palestine, to ignite all of the Middle East and to curtail the U.N. partition resolution

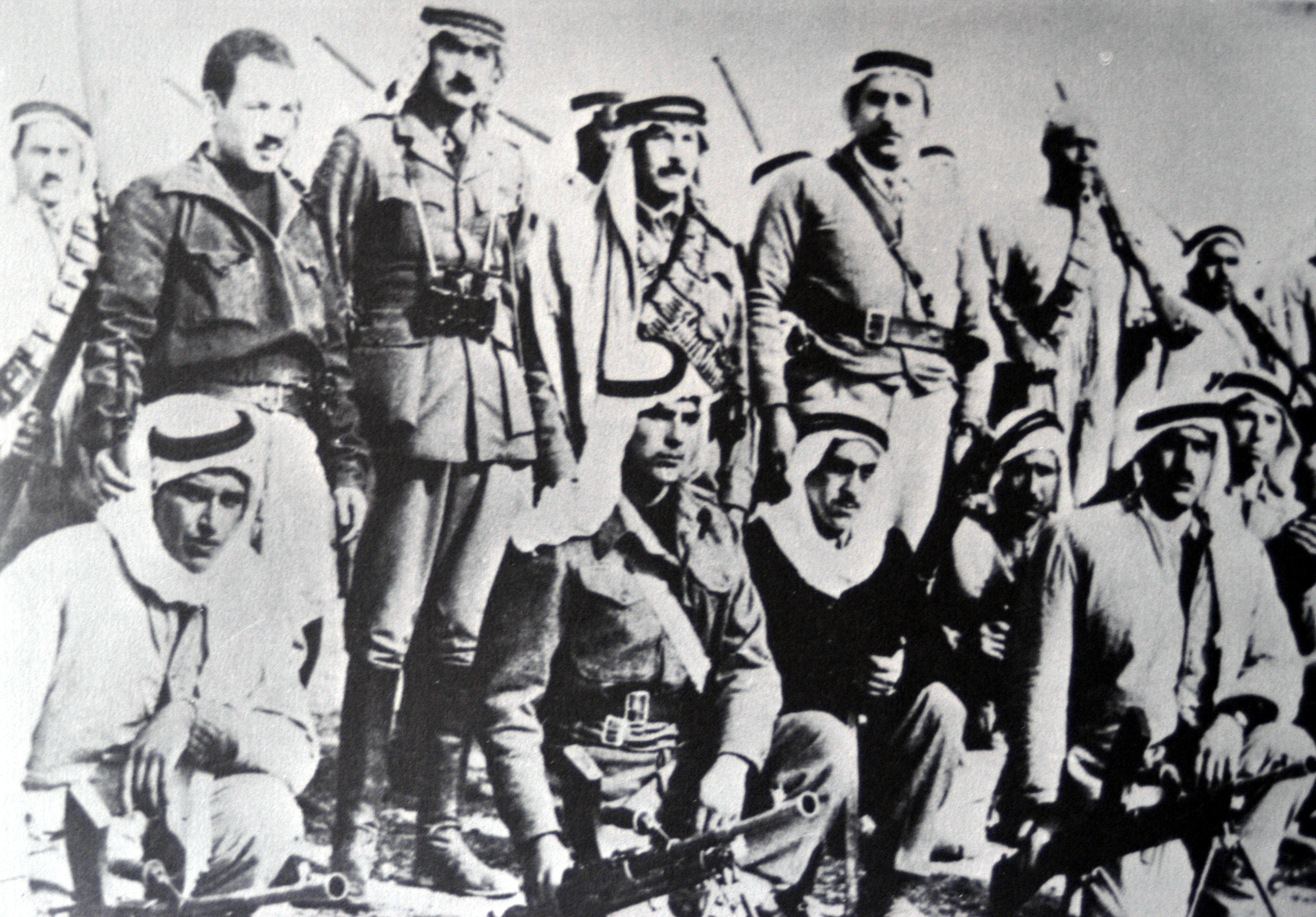
Abd al-Qadir al-Husayni returned to Palestine after an exile of ten years, and began organizing Arab resistance to forcible partition of the country. He is seen here (standing center) with aides and Palestinian irregulars, Jerusalem district, February 1948

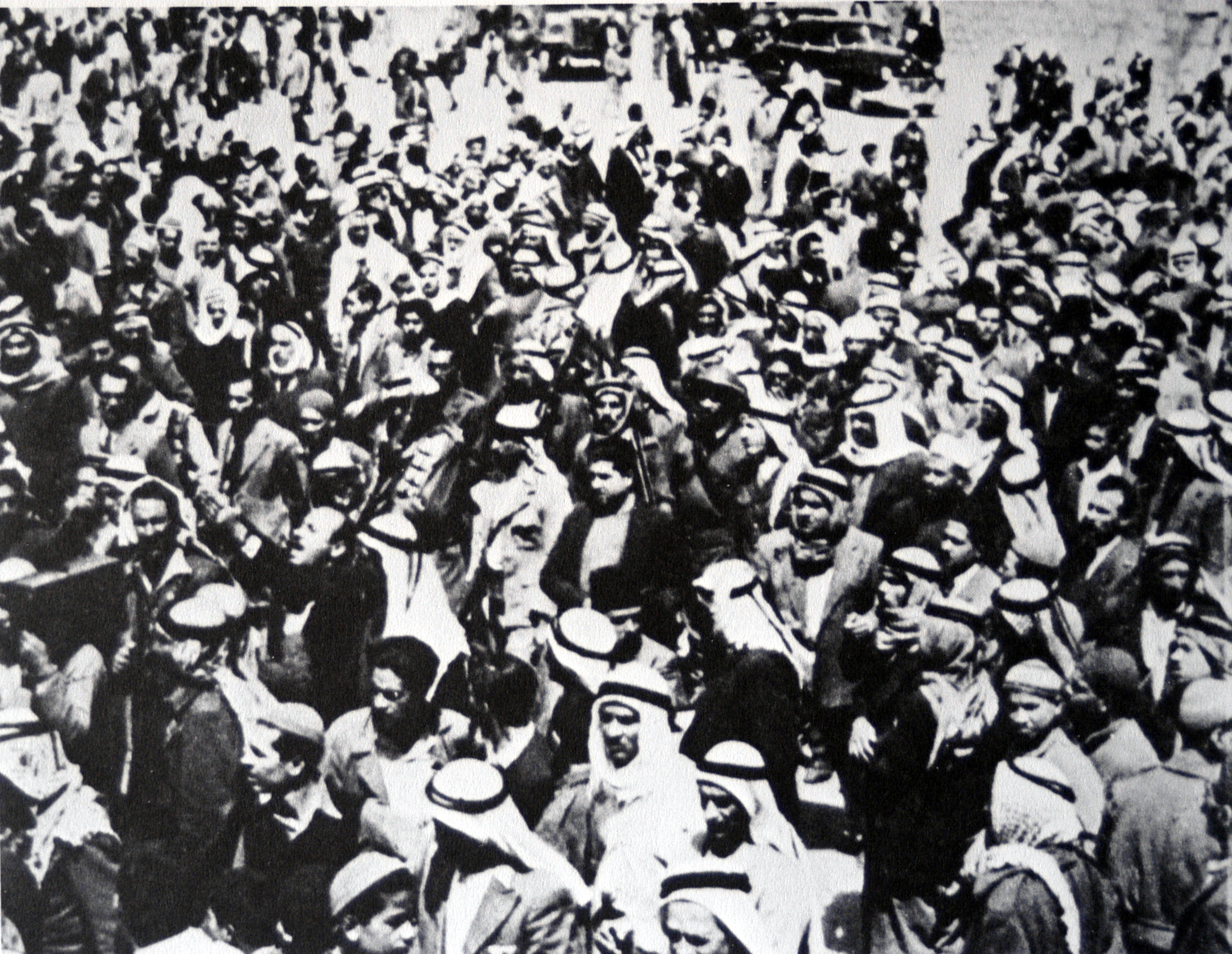
Husayni's funeral at the Al-Aqsa Mosque in Jerusalem.

== Bibliography ==
- Gelber, Yoav (1997). Jewish-Transjordanian Relations 1921–48: Alliance of Bars Sinister. London: Routledge. ISBN 978-0-7146-4675-6
- Gelber, Yoav (2004). Israeli-Jordanian Dialogue, 1948–1953: Cooperation, Conspiracy, or Collusion?. Sussex Academic Press.
- Gelber, Yoav (2004) Independence Versus Nakba; Kinneret Zmora-Bitan Dvir Publishing, ISBN 965-517-190-6
- Gelber, Yoav (2006). Palestine 1948: War, Escape and the Emergence of the Palestinian Refugee Problem. Sussex Academic Press. ISBN 978-1-84519-075-0
- Morris, Benny (2003). The Birth of the Palestinian Refugee Problem Revisited. Cambridge University Press. ISBN 0-521-00967-7
- Morris, Benny (2008). 1948: A History of the First Arab-Israeli War. Yale University Press. ISBN 978-0-300-12696-9
