= Hasan Salama =

Palestinian commander (1912–1948)

Hasan Salama حسن سلامة
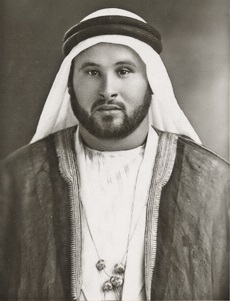
- Hasan Salama, 1939
- Born: 1913; Qula, Ottoman Palestine
- Died: 2 June 1948 (aged 34–35); Ras al-Ein
- Relatives: Ali Hassan Salameh (son)
- Military career
- Allegiance: Arab Higher Committee; Golden Square (Iraq); Nazi Germany; Holy War Army
- Branch: Army of the Holy War
- Service years: 1936–1948
- Conflicts: 1936–39 Arab revolt in Palestine; Second World War; (Mediterranean and Middle East theatre of World War II); Anglo-Iraqi War; Operation ATLAS; 1947–1948 civil war in Mandatory Palestine; 1948 Arab-Israeli War

Hasan Salama (also spelled Hassan Salameh; Arabic: حسن سلامة, Ḥasan Salāmah; 1913 – 2 June 1948) was a Palestinian Arab nationalist guerrilla leader and commander who led the Palestinian Holy War Army (Jaysh al-Jihad al-Muqaddas, Arabic: جيش الجهاد المقدس) in the 1948 Palestine War along with Abdul Qadir al-Husseini.

== Biography ==
=== Palestine ===
Salama was born in the village Qula in 1913 during the Ottoman rule over Palestine. He was one of the leaders of armed Arab groups who fought against British authorities and the Yishuv. He participated in the violent 1933 Jaffa demonstrations during the 1933 Palestine riots, and became a leader of the 1936–39 Arab revolt in Palestine.

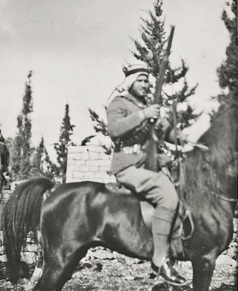
Salama with rifle in hand and on horseback during the revolt in Mandatory Palestine, 1939

At the beginning of the Revolt in early May 1936 he was assigned to command the Lydda - al-Ramla - Jaffa area. He planned and led a number of successful operations against the British mandatory forces and the Yishuv. These operations included blowing up railway tracks and electrical power poles, severing lines of communication, and burning Yishuv orchards. In 1938 Salama was wounded when he blew up a train on the Lydda-Haifa line. Salama fought under nom de guerre Abu Ali.

=== Kingdom of Iraq ===
After the Arab revolt collapsed in Palestine and the breaking of World War II, in October 1939, Salama fled via Beirut and Damascus to Baghdad, together with the mufti of Jerusalem Hajj Amin al-Husseini, Arab High Committee members Jamal al-Husayni, Rafiq al-Tamimi and the revolt military leaders Fawzi al-Qawuqji and Arif Abd al-Razzaq. When he was in Damascus, Syria in 1939, according to British records, Salama "approached indirectly" the British and offered his services to round up his past comrades. The British declined. In Iraq Salama had graduated the Military College at Baghdad together with other Army of the Holy War commanders including Abd al-Qadir al-Husayni and 'Abd-al-Rahim Mahmud. The military training was possible due to the special relationship between the mufti and the Iraqi government. Salama supported Rashid Ali al-Gaylani and led a group of 165 Palestinian fighters. He participated in the Rashid Ali coup of 1941 and the subsequent Anglo-Iraqi War.

=== World War II and Operation Atlas ===
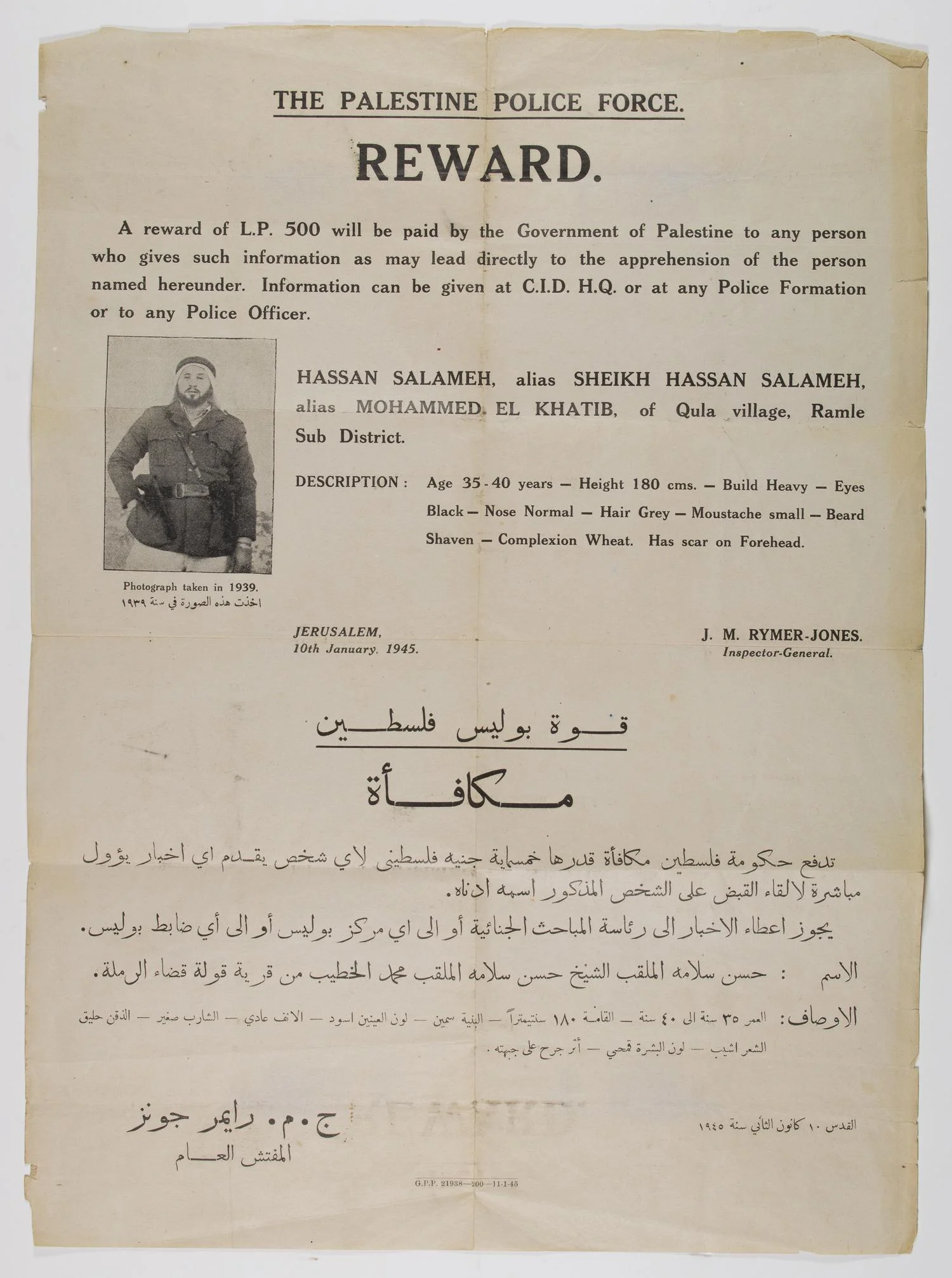
1945 reward poster

Salama followed the grand mufti al-Husseini to Nazi Germany and became his senior aid and a virtual covert operative of the Germans." Salama fled to Berlin from Iraq as a member of the mufti's entourage which included also Fawzi al-Qawuqji. The mufti and his aids were put on payroll by Nazis and were provided with office and living space for the duration of the war. Salama took a German wife and went through commando and sabotage training, and served a member of a special commando unit of the German foreign intelligence organization Amt VI. He participated in Operation ATLAS: on the night of October 6, 1944, Salama and four other commandos (three German Templars and one Palestinian Arab) parachuted from a German plane into mandatory Palestine over Wadi Qelt. Their equipment reportedly included explosives, submachine guns, dynamite, radio equipment and 5,000 Pound sterling. They had some poison capsules intended to liquidate locals believed to be collaborating with the mandatory authorities One of the Germans and Salama evaded capture, and he took refuge in Qula, where a physician treated his injured foot. The operation was intended to supply local Palestinian Arab resistance groups with resources and arms, and to direct sabotage activity primarily at Jewish (rather than British) targets.

=== 1947–1948 Palestine War ===
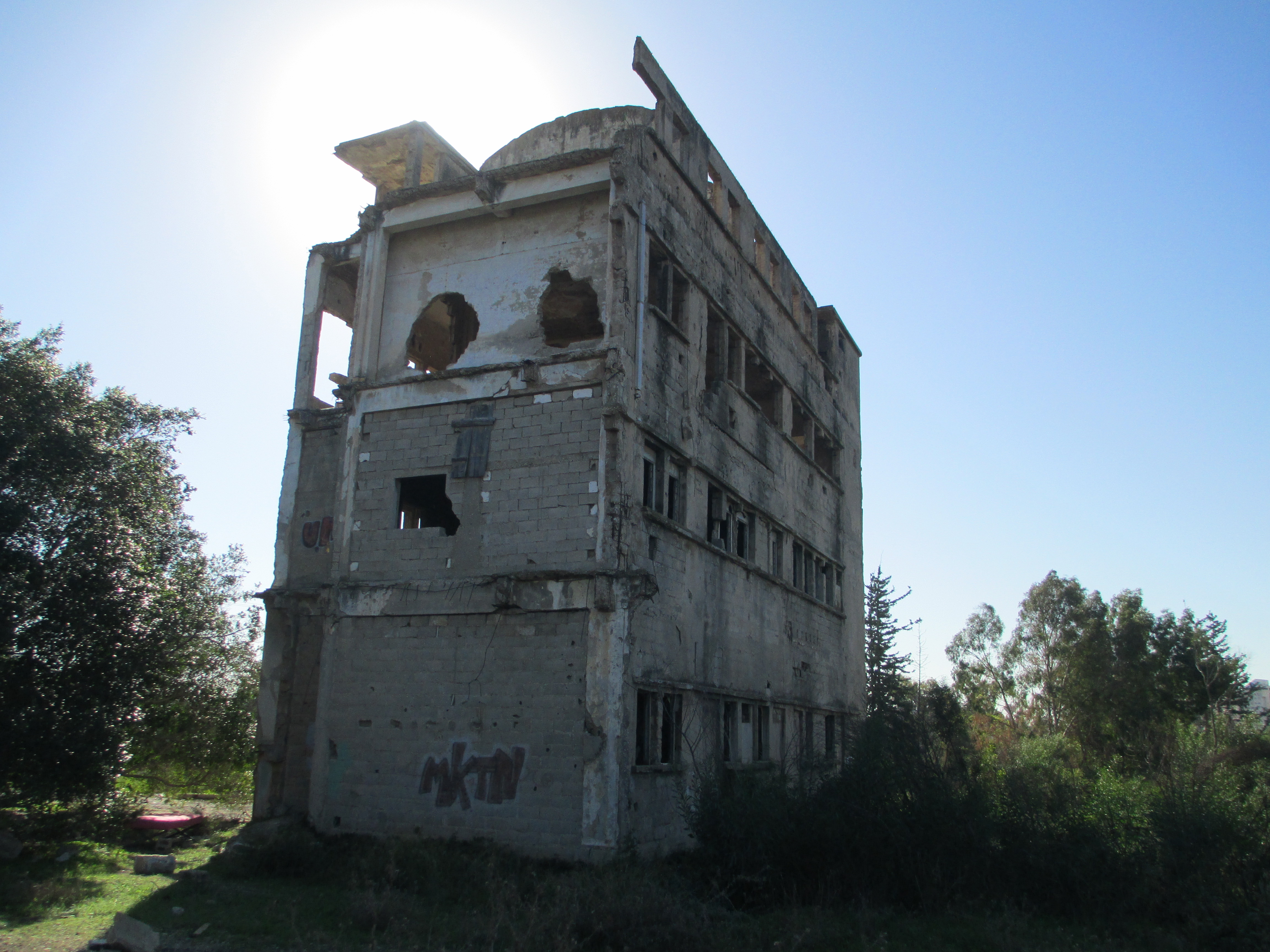
North face (breached by sappers) of HQ building of Hasan Salama near Al-Ramla in 2015

In 1947 Salameh re-emerged as second-in-command of the Army of the Holy War, a force of Palestinian irregulars in the 1947–48 Civil War associated with Grand Mufti al-Husseini. The force has been described as Abd al-Qadir al-Husayni's "personal" army. Salama had retrieved Nazi arms that had been hidden in the Egyptian desert during WWII, and on December 8, 1947, used them to attack Tel Aviv's Hatikva Quarter. Haganah had prior information and were expecting the attack. After three-hour battle Palestinians retreated, Salama lost about one hundred men killed. The mufti assigned Salama to the Lydda district, the appointment acknowledged by the Military Committee of the Arab league, however after Jaffa's commander Al-Hawwari, who was appointed at December 1947, had openly met with Haganah intelligence service officers to discuss cease-fire, Al-Hawwari was abolished from Jaffa. At January 22, Salama had arrived at Jaffa commanding forty Bosnian Yugoslavian troops, who were experienced soldiers familiar with preparing, using explosives and building fortifications, probably veterans of the Muslim division of Waffen SS recruited by the mufti for Nazis. Salama remained in Jaffa for ten days. Salama was partially successful in organizing militia of five hundred men from the armed groups active in Jaffa, though some joined "only nominally". At a meeting held in Damascus on 5 February 1948, Salama was removed from Jaffa by the Military Committee of the Arab league and his assignment to the Lydda district was reconfirmed. As a regional commander Salama organised activity along the roads in his region along Al-Ramla - Jaffa road. About five hundred Bosnian volunteers joined Salama and Abd al-Qadir al-Husayni ranks. Salama may have known Bosnian Waffen SS 13th Handžar (’Knife’) veterans who joined from his training in Germany during World War II. Foreign volunteers were important part of Salama force, since local Arabs avoided taking part in fighting. For instance, Salama had to use foreign volunteers to carry out an attack he planned on Jewish transport to Rishon Letzion, since Bayt Dajan residents refused to help him. During March 1948 Haganah intelligence had learned that Salama together with Iraqi commander of Al-Ramla established command headquarters in a four-storey building near al-Ramla. On April 5, Givati Brigade's company infiltrated and destroyed the compound, 25 Arabs were killed. Salama was not harmed, however his escape was deemed "disgraceful". However Salama returned to the destroyed building, retrieved the equipment and established his new command headquarters at Yehudia village. There are reports that Salama used ex-Nazi advisors in his fight in Palestine.

Salama was a member of the Palestine Arab Party.

Salama was injured in the battle of Ra's al-‘Ayn and died on 2 June 1948. He was the father of Ali Hassan Salameh, chief of Black September and the man chiefly responsible of the Munich massacre at the 1972 Olympics.
