= Gad Shimron =

Israeli journalist (born 1950)

Gad Shimron גד שימרון
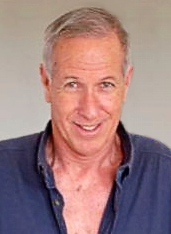
- Gad Shimron, 2009
- Born: 1950 (age 75–76); Tel Aviv, Israel
- Occupations: Mossad Agent, journalist, author and military affairs commentator
- Writing career
- Language: Hebrew

Gad Shimron (Hebrew: גד שימרון; born 1950) is an Israeli journalist, author and military affairs commentator.

== Biography ==
Shimron was born in Tel Aviv. He is a graduate of the Hebrew University of Jerusalem in History and the study of Southeast Asia.

During the 1970s and 1980s, Shimron was a member of various operative units of the Mossad for ten years.

During the 1990s, Shimron served as the European correspondent for the Israeli daily newspaper Ma'ariv, worked as a journalist in the news department of Israel's public domestic and international radio service Kol Yisrael and presented the morning show on the Israeli Channel 1. Shimron continued to work for Ma'ariv until he was fired from the newspaper in 2008.

In addition, Shimron has published seven fiction and non-fiction books on intelligence, security and the history of the Crusaders, in Hebrew, English, French and German.

Between 1984 and 1991 Shimron was instrumental in the rescue of the Ethiopian Jews out of Sudan and Ethiopia by bringing them to Israel.

The script for The Red Sea Diving Resort, a 2019 spy thriller film, was loosely based ("inspired") on an actual undercover mission (part of Operation Brothers) that moved Ethiopian Jews to Israel. Most of the information about this operation was first revealed in Shimron’s book Mossad Exodus: The Daring Undercover Rescue of the Lost Jewish Tribe. As Time magazine points out, however, the film is not associated with the book. Shimron discussed the mission with journalists in 2019, and commented about the risks involved in an undercover operation in the Sudan. "So much happened: We were shot at; I was arrested and interrogated by Sudanese security. Thank goodness nobody was killed or seriously wounded, but the operations moving the immigrants were definitely dangerous."

== Publications ==
- Shimron, Gad (2019). DND גורלי [Fateful DNA] (in Hebrew). Gefen.
- Shimron, Gad (1996). המוסד והמיתוס [The Mossad and the Myth] (in Hebrew). Keter. ISBN 9789650705886. - the book has been translated into French under the name "Mossad's secret hysteria."
- Künzle, Anton; Shimron, Gad (1997). חיסול התליין מריגה [The Execution of the Hangman of Riga] (in Hebrew). Keter. ISBN 9789650706876. - The full story of the only Mossad operation which was aimed at eliminating a Nazi war criminal (Herberts Cukurs). Translated to English, German and Latvian.
- Shimron, Gad (1998). ״הביאו לי את יהודי אתיופיה״ [Bring me the Ethiopian Jews] (in Hebrew). Hed Artzi. - the book focuses on the Mossad's covert operation which brought the Ethiopian Jews to Israel from Sudan. Translated into English under the name Mossad Exodus (Gad Shimron (2007). Mossad Exodus: The Daring Undercover Rescue of the Lost Jewish Tribe. Gefen Publishing House Ltd. ISBN 978-965-229-403-6.).
- Shimron, Gad (1998). השטן בארץ הקודש [Devil in the Holy Land] (in Hebrew). Alfa communications. - a historic novel based on the Crusader period in the region of Palestine.
- Shimron, Gad (1999). לא יכול להיות: רומן מתח פוליטי על מציאות סהרורית [Can Not Be] (in Hebrew). Aviv. - a political thriller about the Israeli Prime Minister blackmailed by his wife.
- Shimron, Gad (2007). צבא אחר: יחידות מיוחדות בצבאות העולם [Another Army] (in Hebrew). Ministry of Defense. ISBN 978-965-05-1340-5. - the book focuses on Special forces in the armies of the world.
- Shimron, Gad; Levit, Anat (2009). אהובת הטמפלר מעמק רפאים [The Sweetheart of the Templar From the Valley of Rephaim] (in Hebrew). Matar. - a historical novel based on a true story.
