= Operation Atlas =

1944 SS operation

- Part of Middle East theatre of World War II and the intercommunal conflict in Mandatory Palestine
- Location: Mandatory Palestine
- Planned by: Sicherheitsdienst
- Objective: Attacking the British rule and fomenting tensions among Jews and Arabs.
- Date: October 1944
- Executed by: A special commando unit under the Sicherheitsdienst
- Outcome: Operation failed
- Casualties: 1 Arrested; Nazi-Arab Soldier killed 3 members injured injured

Operation Atlas was the code name for a failed operation carried out by a German special commando unit under the command of the SD which took place in October 1944. It involved five soldiers: three who were previously members of the Templer religious sect in Mandatory Palestine, and two Palestinian Arabs who were close collaborators of the mufti of Jerusalem, Amin al-Husseini.

Atlas aimed at establishing an intelligence-gathering base in Mandatory Palestine, radioing information back to Germany, and recruiting and arming anti-British Palestinians by buying their support with gold.

The plan utterly failed, and no meaningful action could be undertaken by the commandos. Three of the participants were arrested by the Transjordan Frontier Force a few days after their landing. The German commander was captured in 1946 and the fifth, Hasan Salama, succeeded in escaping.

One version of the incident advanced by Michael Bar-Zohar and Eitan Haber alleges that the mission included a plan to poison the drinking water resources of the residents of Tel Aviv. British and German archives have yet to reveal any evidence for this story, and the mufti's biographers ignore it.

== Background ==
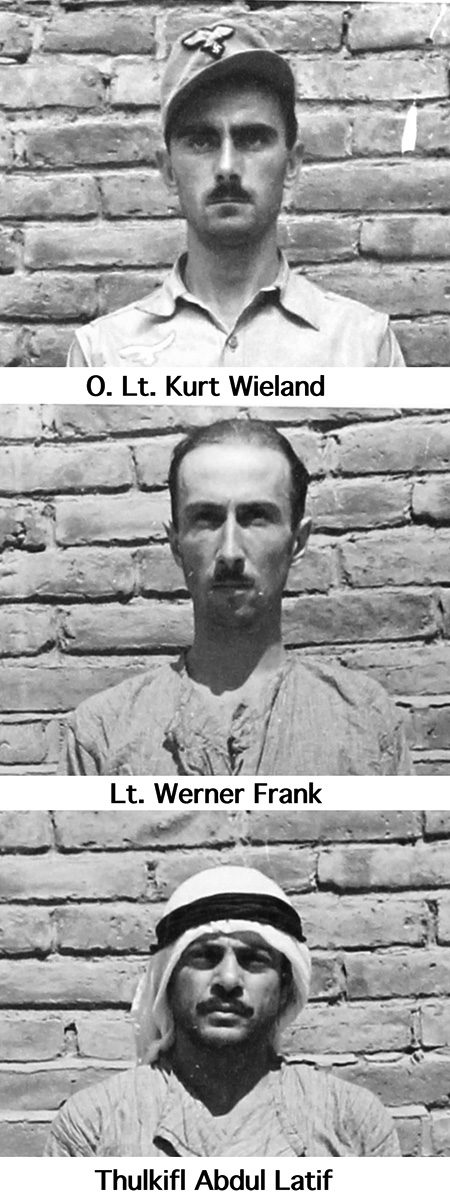
Three captured parachutists

Numerous German-Arab commando operations were conducted over 1943-1944 from North Africa to Syria and Iraq, in order to collect intelligence, conduct sabotage operations against the Allies, and to foment uprisings. Haj Amin al-Husseini was one of prominent Palestinian Arabs leaders who fled Mandatory Palestine in 1937 during 1936–1939 uprising and spent World War II period as a collaborator of the Axis powers.

As the Allied forces closed in on Germany from the west of the Rhine and from the east through Prussia, operations were devised to disrupt and divert Allied forces on Germany's southern and eastern flanks. One such operation in the Middle Eastern theatre consisted of at least one sabotage operation in Palestine. The unit members were ordered to contact pro-Nazi agents in Palestine and set up secret bases in the region.

The operation, originally developed out by Walter Lorch and named Elias, was redesigned by his nephew Kurt Wieland in the summer of 1944 as Operation Atlas. A similar plan had been hatched by Abdullatif Zul el-Kifel, a member of the circle around Amin al-Husayni. (Note: al-Husayni attribuited to Zul el-Kifel the paternity of operation Atlas (Biddiscombe 2018, pp. 795–796, 800).) Al-Husayni argued that were the Jewish insurgency against British authorities in Palestine to fail, they would redirect their anger against Palestinian Arabs who would stand in need of leadership. The Palestine Arab Party (PAP) in Palestine was also pressing for action to retaliate for Arabs deaths incurred by the Jewish revolt. (Note: "Within the homeland itself, the most radical elements in the PAP were already pushing for a campaign of retaliation in response to Arab deaths occurring as a by-product of Palestinian Jewish terrorism. Thus, tactical operations would replicate the anti-Jewish outrages of the interwar period. The focus was on prospective bombings of synagogues and burnings of shops owned by Palestinian Jews, and the Mufti suggested that his fighters be equipped with incendiary devices." (Biddiscombe 2018, p. 797)) al-Husayni imagined preparing the ground by such an operation so that they could take over the leadership in what would be a defensive operation. He also insisted that the Palestinian commandos in such a raiding operation avoid any confrontations with the British Mandatory power, envisaging that desistence would improve his future negotiating power in the region.

To obtain Nazi support for his version of the plan, al-Husayni had to overcome his reluctance to allow Palestinian Germans to participate in the operation. On the other hand, the anti-Jewish focus suited the SS, and one original proposal by Karl Tschierschky to include an Atlas attack on the Haifa Oil Refinery that would provoke British reprisals was scuppered for that reason.

== Commando members ==
The implementation of this particular plan was assigned to Kurt Wieland, an intelligence operative, whose background in the region would enable him to make use of his operational experience, his familiarity with Palestine and his connections with the locals. Wieland was a Palestine-born German from the Templer community in Sarona and had developed a personal animus against the Yishuv after his family business had suffered as a result of a local Jewish anti-Nazi boycott. He became head of the Palestinian Hitler Youth in 1938. He joined the Brandenburg regiment in 1940, and took part in the SSF covert German mission to Iraq in 1941. Wieland was assigned to the military intelligence corps due to his knowledge of languages. He advanced rapidly in the ranks and was soon appointed major, serving in the special commando unit of the Waffen-SS under the command of Otto Skorzeny. The unit involved belonged to Amt V1, the Third Reich's civilian foreign intelligence agency. Wieland was in charge of the technical side of the operation.

In addition to Wieland, two more German Templars, from the Brandenburg division: were assigned to the unit. Werner Frank, born in Haifa and a member of the Hitler Youth organization since 1934, was a radio-operator born in Haifa. Friedrich Deininger, born in Waldheim. Deininger had assisted the Palestinian Arab forces during the Palestinian uprising and, as a result, had been imprisoned at Bat Yam..

Two Palestinian Arabs, attached to Amin al Husseini's milieu in Germany, were also assigned to the unit: Hasan Salama, and Abdul Latif, a native of Jerusalem, who had been sent into exile for involvement in the 1936-9 uprising and became the Berlin editor of the mufti's Arabic radio addresses. He was delegated to look after political connections. All five members of the unit were briefed by al-Husseini before the mission.

== The operation ==
The operation was a failure from the start due to intelligence gathered earlier by the local authorities about German operations in the area due to the defection of Abwehr agent Erich Vermehren earlier in February 1944, mismanagement of the parachute drop, and the cold reception their presence in the area encountered from local Palestinian Arabs.

On the night of 6 October 1944, the five unit members parachuted from a captured B-17 Flying Fortress flown by Luftwaffe KG 200 over the Jericho region in Wadi Qelt. Their equipment included submachine guns, dynamite, radio equipment, a duplicating machine, a German-Arabic dictionary, 5,000 Pound sterling in different currencies and explosives. It was the discovery of these dispersed cargo boxes on 9 October that alerted the British to the fact an operation was underway.

The unit was dropped in different locations near Jericho, and most of their equipment scattered around those locations. Hasan Salama, who was injured during the parachuting, began heading towards Jerusalem after he landed. Abdul Latif and two Germans hid in a cave in Wadi Qelt.

Both local people recommended by the Mufti, Nafith and Ali Bey al-Husseini, refused to provide any support to the commando. Later, during his interrogation by the police, Abdul Latif claimed that Ali Bey had stated that "he was not mad enough to provide them any support". He added that Nafith Bey had explained to him that they were not aware of the political relationship between Arabs and British and that it was a terrible mistake to participate to such an adventure with Germans.

== Aftermath ==
Kurt Wieland, Werner Frank and Abdul Latif were captured. The information about their capture was revealed to the inhabitants of Palestine in October 1944. On 16 October the British Mandate authorities published the following official statement:

Police information led to a combined military and police operation in the Wadi Qelt area and resulted in an important arrests by the Trans Jordan Frontier Force

On 27 October a full report of the capturing of the enemy parachutists was published in the Davar newspaper under the title:

Enemy parachutists were captured nine days after parachuting in the region. two Germans and one Arab. – They came equipped with money, Arab dictionaries and weapons.

The newspaper stated that on 8 October, the Jericho police chief learned that gold coins were being circulated in the city. As a result, an investigation was initiated which resulted in the seizure of gold coins from five local shepherds. The shepherds told the policemen of the site in which they discovered the coins. As a result, a manhunt began which involved military and local police forces, as well as members of the Arab Legion and the Transjordan Frontier Force. On 16 October a sergeant in the Jordanian Frontier Force discovered a man dressed in traditional Arab clothing, standing at the entrance to a cave and holding a gun. The man surrendered without a fight and soon afterwards two additional people were discovered inside the cave, a German and an Arab.

Hasan Salama and Frederick Deininger were not captured, and several days afterwards, the search for them was halted. Deininger was not caught until 1946, when he attempted to renew contact with his family in Wilhelma. Hasan Salama managed to flee to a house of a doctor in a small village near Qula, where he had a foot injury treated.

== Historiography ==
=== Document release ===
On 4 July 2001, about 200 secret documents from the British MI5 Archives were released to the public, most of which were related to Germany from the years 1939–1944. Among the documents released, was detailed information relating to the German Operation Atlas and the German and Palestinian Arab unit members who were parachuted into Palestine to carry out the operation.

=== The mission to poison Tel Aviv story ===
In 1983, Michael Bar-Zohar and Eitan Haber published The Quest for the Red Prince, a book about the hunt by Mossad agents for Ali Hassan Salameh, son of Hasan Salama, the Black September's head of operations who had been responsible for the execution of the 1972 Munich massacre.

They allege that the project included a plan, specifically thought up by al-Husseini, to poison the water supply of Tel Aviv. The drop is said to have included several cardboard boxes containing a fine white powder consisting of a strong water-soluble poison. Each box is said to have contained poison sufficient to kill about 25,000 people. This part of the parachuted cargo is said to have gone astray, with the unit failing in attempts to recover them.

This Bar-Zohar/Haber story is repeated uncritically in several sources. Historian Klaus Gensicke in his book Der Mufti von Jerusalem und die Nationalsozialisten. (The Mufti of Jerusalem and the Nazis) where he also asserts that al-Husseini was "a genocidal player in the Holocaust". The story reappears also in Youssef Aboul-Enein and Basil H. Aboul-Enein's The Secret War for the Middle East: The Influence of Axis and Allied Operations During World War Two, and in Alan Dershowitz The Case for Israel.

Historian Wolfgang G. Schwanitz has cast doubts on the story:

The claim that the mufti got "ten containers with poison" to kill a quarter of a million people via the water system of Tel Aviv in exchange for the five Palestinian paratroopers in late 1944 (61) is not substantiated in British or German sources. If the authors can now show really hard proof, this would be a discovery, since the British police report of 1944 on file is very detailed.

In his Beyond Chutzpah: On the Misuse of Anti-Semitism and the Abuse of History, Norman Finkelstein notes that this claim has not been reported by the scholarly literature or by many other works that target the Mufti:

The major biographies of the Mufti are The Mufti of Jerusalem by Palestinian historian Philip Mattar and The Grand Mufti by Israeli historian Zvi Elpeleg. (...). Neither mentions a German-Arab commando unit en route to poison Tel Aviv's wells.

Historian Christian Destremau points out that the cargo contained no such quantities of toxic material, but only poison capsules, probably to be of service in attempts to liquidate locals believed to be collaborating with the Mandatory Authorities. According to MI5 files, the parachutists brought three types of poison to Palestine: some suicide pills for themselves, six tubes of powder to put tracking dogs off their scent (they didn't realise this was poisonous and kept it with their food) and an envelope of "arseneous oxide". Regarding these latest, Wieland said that the mufti insisted it be brought for the purpose of eliminating Arab traitors but Latif denied it was the mufti's idea. The 400-page files do not mention any intention to poison population or enough quantities for such a plan.

=== In popular fiction ===
In 2009, the Israeli journalist and military affairs commentator, Gad Shimron, published the fictional novel "The Sweetheart of the Templar From the Valley of Rephaim", which incorporated the story of Operation Atlas while making several changes to the plot, the exact period in which the parachuting was carried out, the names, and their fate.

== Sources ==
- Aboul-Enein, Youssef H.; Aboul-Enein, Basil H. (2013). The Secret War for the Middle East: The Influence of Axis and Allied Intelligence Operations During World War II. Naval Institute Press. ISBN 978-1-612-51309-6.
- Adams, Jefferson (2009). Historical Dictionary of German Intelligence. Historical Dictionaries of Intelligence and Counter-Intelligence. Scarecrow Press. ISBN 978-0-810-86320-0.
- Bar-Zohar, Michael; Haber, Eitan (2002) [First published 1983]. The Quest for the Red Prince. The Lyons Press. ISBN 978-1-58574-739-9.
- Biddiscombe, Perry (July 2018). "The Mufti's Men: Haj Amin al-Husayni and SS Parachute Expeditions to Palestine and Iraq, 1944–1945". Journal of Military History. 82 (3): 783–815 – via GWonline: Bibliography, Filmography and Webography on Gender and War since 1600.
- Dershowitz, Alan (2003). The Case for Israel. Wiley. ISBN 978-0-471-67952-3.
- Destremau, Christian (2011). Le Moyen-Orient pendant la Seconde Guerre mondiale. Perrin. ISBN 978-226203880-9.
- Finkelstein, Norman (2008) [First published 2005]. Beyond Chutzpah. University of California Press. p. 322. ISBN 978-0-520-24989-9 – via Internet Archive.
- Fountain, Rick (5 July 2001). "Nazis planned Palestine subversion". BBC News.
- "Kurt Wieland, alias Heinz Hecht, Frederick Baksen, Abu Yassin". London: The National Archives. 11 May 2001.
- Mallmann, Klaus Michael; Cüppers, Martin (2006). Halbmond und Hakenkreuz: das Dritte Reich, die Araber und Palästina (2nd ed.). Wissenschaftliche Buchgesellschaft. ISBN 978-3-534-19729-3.
- Mallmann, Klaus Michael; Cüppers, Martin (2010). Matthäus, Jürgen; Mallmann, Klaus-Michael (eds.). Nazi Palestine: The Plans for the Extermination of the Jews in Palestine. Enigma Books. ISBN 978-1-936-27418-5.
- Schwanitz, Wolfgang G. (November 2010). "Benny Morris: 1948". Sehepunkte. 10 (11).
- Schwanitz, Wolfgang G. (Spring 2009). "Review: The Mufti of Jerusalem". Jewish Political Studies Review. 21 (1/2): 182–187. JSTOR 25834834.
- Zohar, Gil (20 December 2020). "The führer of the Arabs". The Jerusalem Post.
