= Walhalla (colony) =

German Templer colony in Ottoman and British Palestine

Walhalla/Valhalla was a German Templer Colony located east of Tel Aviv and north of Jaffa, next to Neve Tzedek. It was established during the Ottoman Era.

== History ==
The German Templers established a small neighborhood in the late 1890s and early 1900s adjacent to the Neve Tzedek neighbourhood, between the Turkish railroad and the road to nearby Jaffa. The present location of the settlement is on the side of Eilat Street. The Templers believed that establishing a colony in the Holy Land was vital to perfecting the second coming of Christ. The population grew from 250 inhabitants in 1885 to around 300 people later in the decade according to the Warte.

This neighborhood was home to a number of German families who were involved in trade and crafts in Jaffa. "Walhalla" was the neighborhood's name, derived from the name of the Germanic paradise of the Gods in Asgard.

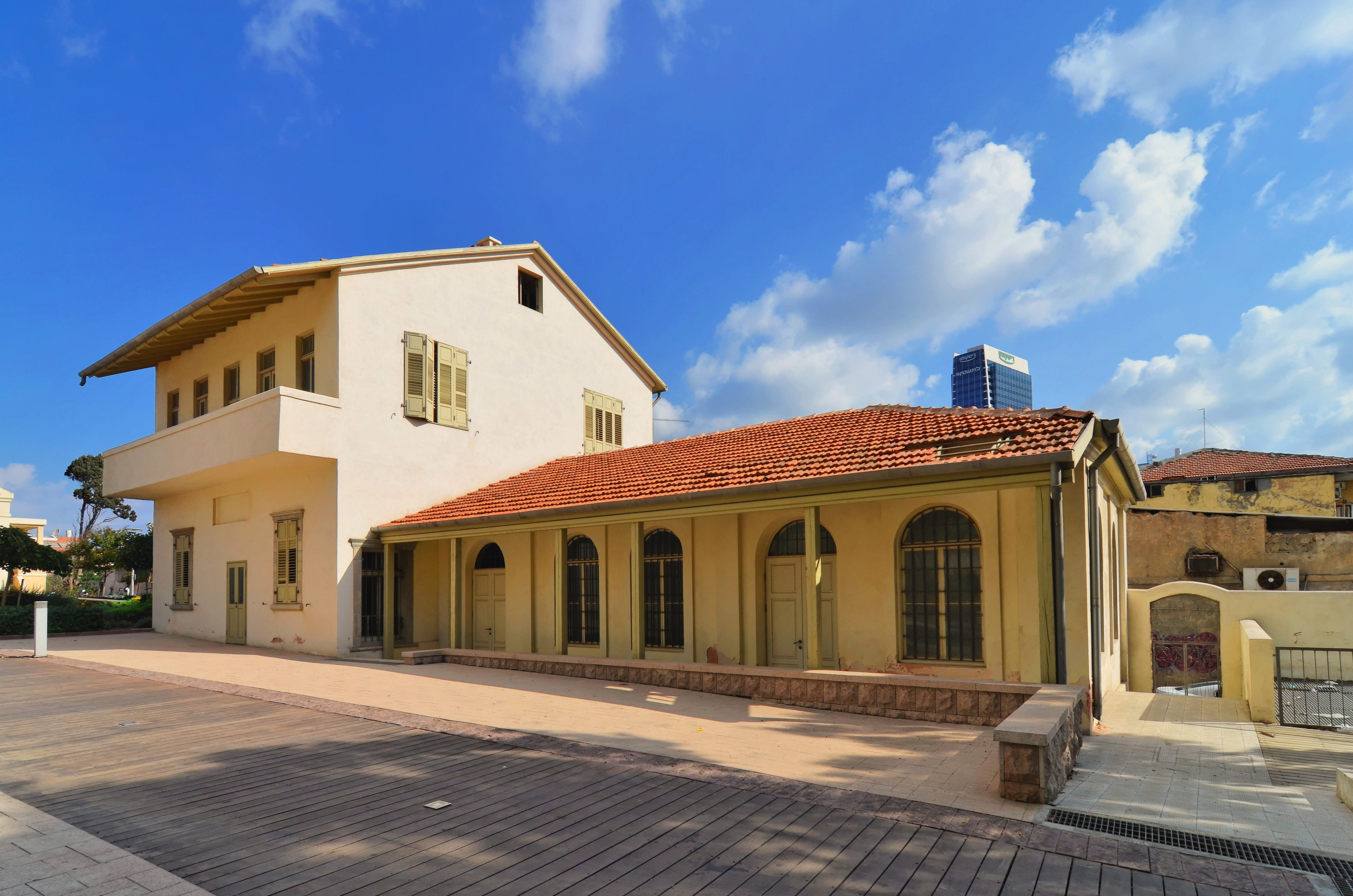
The Wagner Iron foundry

In this neighborhood was the residence of the German consulate and the "Wagner" iron foundry named after its owner Gotthilf Wagner. (later the mayor of Sarona) The Wagner factory produced weapons for the Turkish and German troops who were camped in the land during World War I. The Germans mainly knew Valhalla, while most residents in the area called it the "Wagner neighborhood."

Another settler, Hugo Wieland who belonged to the messianic movement "The Templers" settled in the Holy Land, purchased land in Walhalla and built his house and the "Wieland" factory on it for the production of painted tiles and concrete construction elements inside the Ottoman Railway Station in Jaffa.

In 1898, Kaiser Wilhelm II visited the Holy Land, his ship anchored in the port of Haifa facing the Templer colony. The Kaiser saw the colonists as a boost to German colonial interest and loans were given to colonists who set up new colonies and settlements in the region.

Nearby was the restaurant and nightclub Café Lorenz, named after Franz Lorenz. There is a modern Café with the same name which is a homage to the original Café Lorenz. The modern Café Lorenz is a centre for Jewish culture, being refurbished and reopened in 2010.

During World War II, the German residents of Walhalla were removed and placed in a detention camp due to being considered “enemy nationals”. The British took over the houses for their own needs. Several of these houses remain in Valhalla, one of which houses the Ministry of Industry and Trade, and another house is the shanty house.

A couple of the buildings of the colony have been renovated, including Café Lorenz, the former German consulate and the Wagner factory.
