= Bank of the Temple Society =

Defunct bank in Palestine

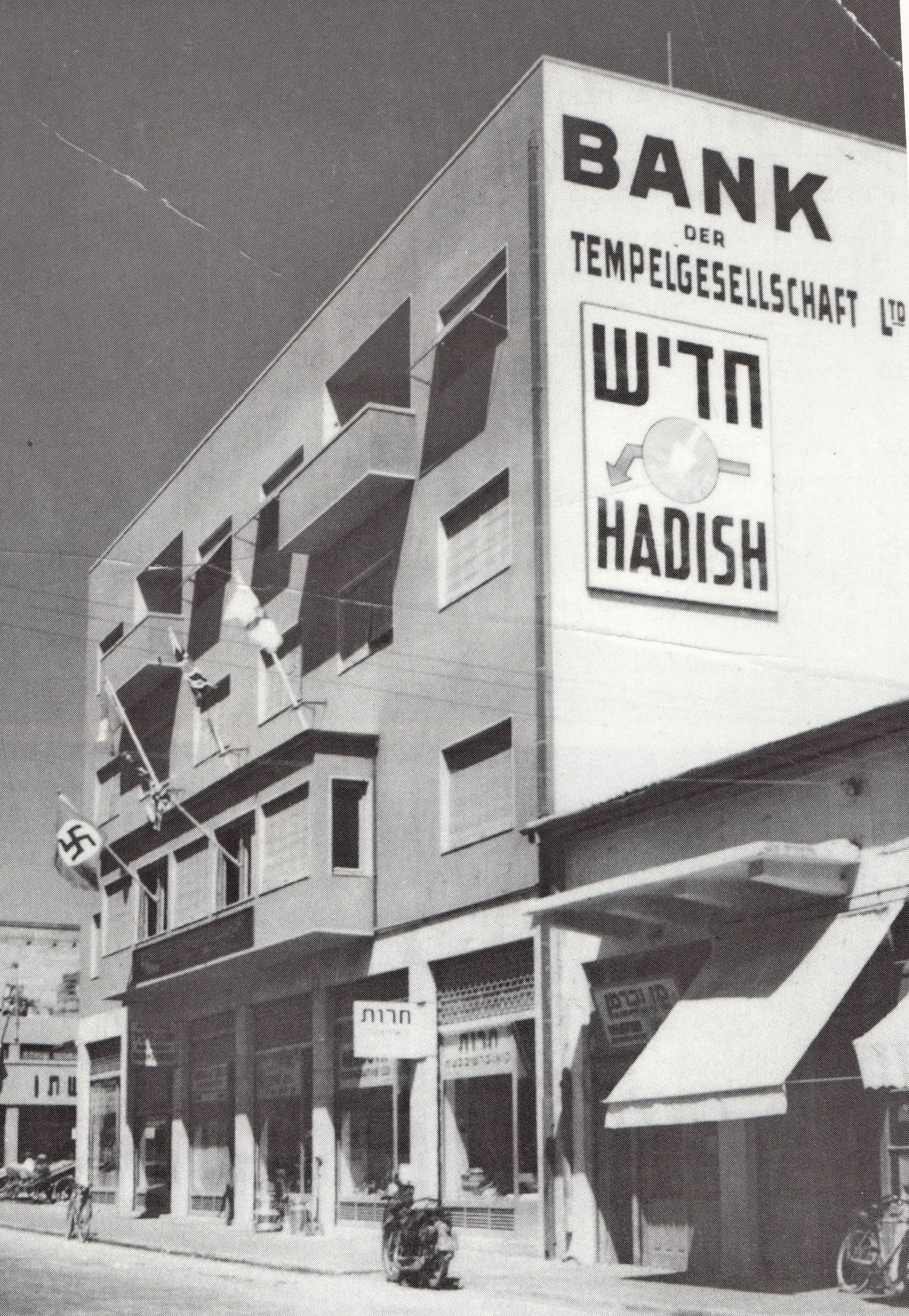
- The Bank in Jaffa, 1935–1939
- Native name: Bank der Tempelgesellschaft Ltd.
- Type: Private company
- Industry: Financial services
- Founded: 1924
- Founders: German Pietist Templer society
- Defunct: September 1939
- Fate: Liquidated by the British government of Palestine
- Headquarters: Jaffa, Mandatory Palestine
- Area served: Palestine
- Products: Banking services
- Owner: German Pietist Templar society

The Bank of the Temple Society (Bank der Tempelgesellschaft Ltd.) was a bank in Mandatory Palestine.

== History ==
=== Origins and Formation ===
Under the direction of Christoph Hoffmann and Georg David Hardegg, the German Pietist Templer society, which had established itself in Palestine since 1868, founded the Bank of the Temple Society in 1925.

Many Templers experienced economic instability, property confiscation, and deportation under the British occupation of Palestine following World War I. The bank was established by the community to aid in the reconstruction of the economy, offer financing, and promote commercial, industrial, and agricultural businesses in the Templer colonies and the larger Palestinian economy. It was registered a limited company in August 1924 with a capital of 10,000 pounds. The initial directors, elected in February 1925, were Christoph Hoffmann, Gotthilf Wagner, Wilhelm Aberle, Hermann Imberger and Emil Kirchner.

=== Growth of operations ===
With branches in Haifa and Jerusalem to serve the main Templer colonies, the main office was in Jaffa.

The bank had a diversified workforce that included Arab, Jewish, and German workers. It had more than forty German individuals working for it.

The bank collaborated with organizations like the Trust and Transport Office (Haavara) to promote international trade and Jewish emigration from Germany, and it was instrumental in funding important enterprises like the export of Jaffa oranges from Sarona.

The Bank of the Temple Society was a bank in Mandatory Palestine. Founded by members of German Pietist Templer society in 1925, the bank was intended to support economic reconstruction in Templer colonies. Its main office was in Jaffa with branches in Haifa and Jerusalem.

The bank collaborated with organizations like the Trust and Transport Office (Haavara) to promote international trade and Jewish emigration from Germany, and it was instrumental in funding important enterprises like the export of Jaffa oranges from Sarona.

=== Influence and Economic Role ===
Through loans, investments, and trade facilitation, the Bank of the Temple Society supported the local economy and Templer settlers, becoming one of Palestine's top credit institutions during its existence.

Individual shareholders from the Templer diaspora as well as founding shares owned by the core Society of the Temple Society, which served as the community's core fund, were included in its capital structure.

=== Decline and Liquidation ===
As World War II began, the Templers in Palestine, being German nationals, were regarded as enemy aliens by British officials. The bank’s activities were hindered, and the Government of Palestine began formally liquidating it in September 1939, a process that concluded around the time of the creation of the State of Israel in 1948.

The Bank of the Temple Society stands as a critical financial institution during the Mandate for Palestine, outlining how a devout settlement community utilized fund to maintain and grow its social, rural, and mechanical nearness some time recently geopolitical occasions driven to its closure.

=== Relations with the local economy ===
The bank's activities extended beyond the Templer community itself. A 1926 letter of recommendation written by the bank's director, Christoph Hoffmann, on behalf of the Jewish industrialist Shaul Levi, indicates that the bank was also used by non-Templer businesspeople active in Jaffa and Jerusalem, and had a reputation as a stable and dependable institution in Mandate-era Palestine.
