= Old German Consulate building (Tel Aviv) =

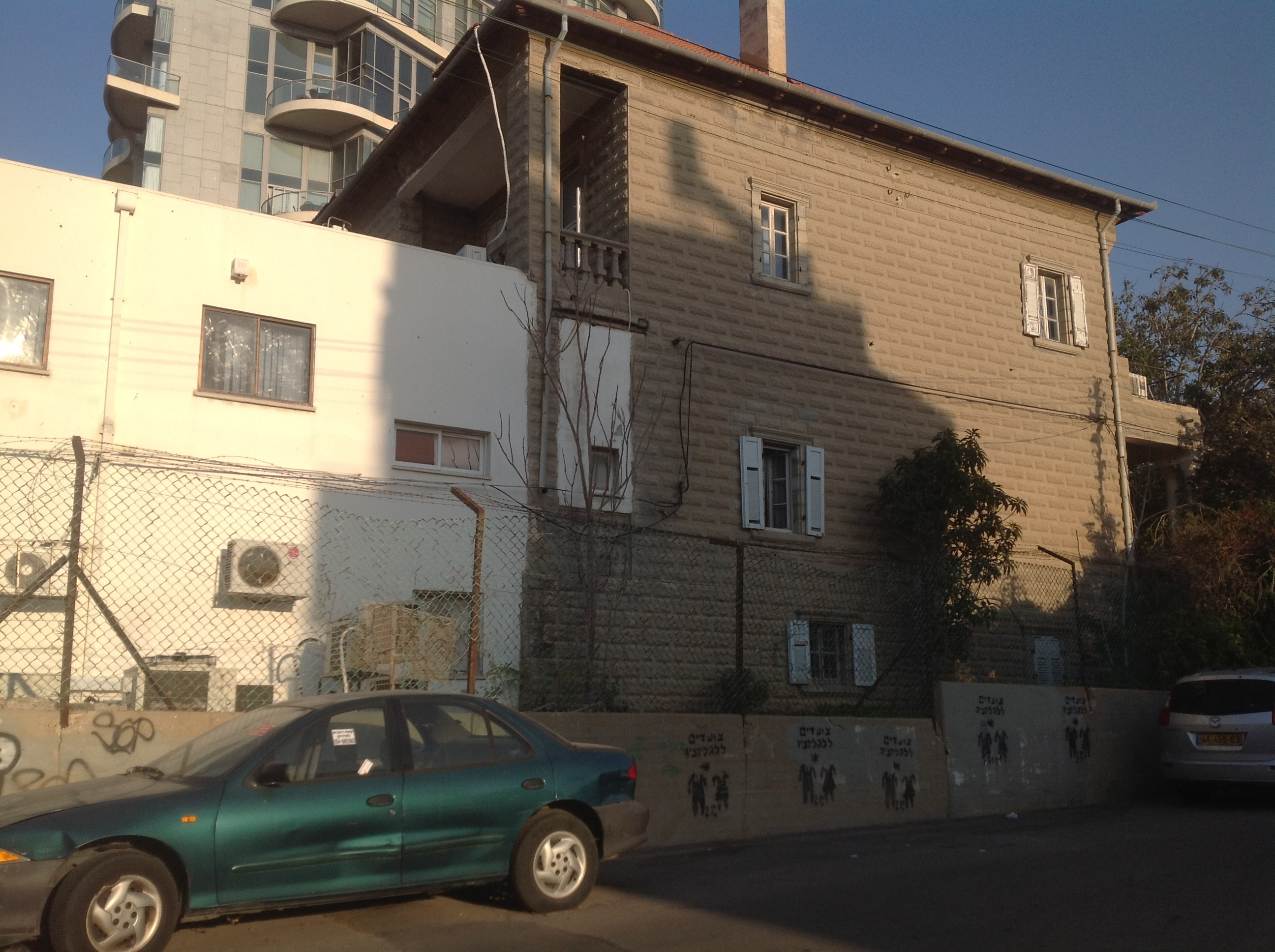

General information
- Address: Eilat street 59, Tel Aviv
- Town or city: Tel Aviv
- Country: Israel
- Coordinates: 32.05946°N 34.76684°E
- Completed: 1916
- Owner: State of Israel

The Old German Consulate building is a historic building, built as the Consulate of the German Empire in the Templar neighborhood of "Walhalla" in Jaffa, nowadays part of Tel Aviv. Its construction began in 1913, next to Nablus Road (today, Eilat street 59 in Tel Aviv).

The professionals who designed the building and its surroundings were the architect Karl Appel (from Germany) and the local Templer Johann Martin Wennagel, and the garden designer was Johannes Laemmle. The construction was done in cooperation with the head of the German Templer colonies in Palestine. The ending of the construction was delayed due to World War I, which broke out in the middle of 1914. As such, the building was inaugurated only in 1916, by the German consul Walter Rößler (Rössler; 1871–1929).

The Consulate building and the well-tended garden around it served as a social center for the members of the German Templer colonies in Palestine. With the occupation of Jaffa by the British in World War I, the building was temporarily used as the central canteen and as an occasional residence for British soldiers.

Afterwards, it resumed its function as the Consulate of Germany. According to local Jewish reports, non-Jewish members of local German community used to proudly wave the flags of Nazi Germany with the swastika starting from 1937 until the outbreak of World War II, on the building and the adjacent Wagner factory.

The German consulate was closed in the early 1940s and non-Jewish German residents were deported to Australia, as they were subjects of an enemy country.

After the establishment of the State of Israel, the building became a property of the Israeli government.
