= Yossi Ben-Artzi =

Israeli Historian and Geographer

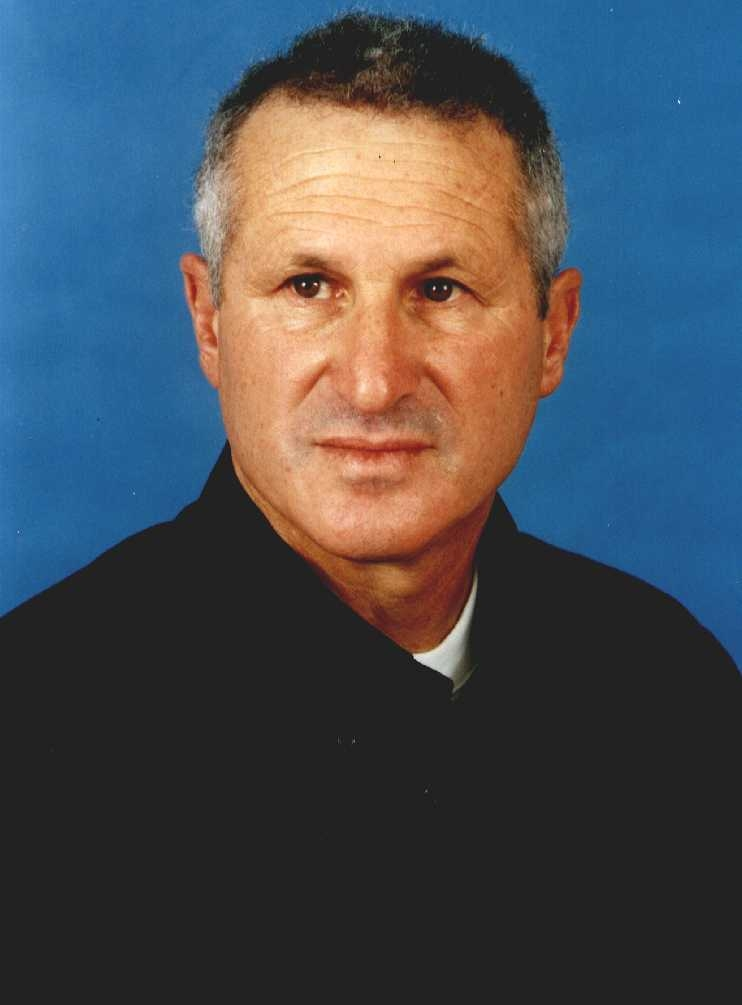
Image of Yossi Ben-Artzi

Yossi Ben-Artzi (Hebrew: יוסי בן ארצי; born July 4, 1949) is an Israeli historian and geographer. He is a professor in the Department of Israel Studies at the University of Haifa, where he served as Rector from 2004 to 2010. Ben-Artzi currently serves as the academic head of the IDF Military Colleges administration, chairman of the board of The Society for the Protection of Nature in Israel, and chairman of the Street Names Committee of Haifa.

== Biography ==
Ben-Artzi was born and raised in Haifa. His family on his father's side were among the founders of the settlement of Hartuv in the Judaean Mountains(near modern-day Beit Shemesh) in 1895. The family left Hartuv following the 1929 Hebron massacre, in which the settlement was attacked and destroyed by Arabs from the neighboring village of Dayr Aban. The family was among the founders of Even-Yehuda in the Sharon plain. Ben-Artzi graduated from the Hebrew Reali School in Haifa in 1967. He served for 4 years in the Israel Defense Forces (IDF) and was discharged with the rank of Lieutenant. He joined the Carmeli Brigade in the reserves, where he served as a Company Commander, a Deputy Battalion Commander during 1982 Lebanon War, and a Battalion Commander with the rank of lieutenant colonel. He attended the graduate course for Brigade Commanders in 1992. Since then, he has served as the deputy commander of the Central Unit for Searching Israeli MIAs, (EITAN) in the IDF from 1992 to 2009.

Ben-Artzi earned a Bachelor's degree in Geography and Middle Eastern history at the University of Haifa, as well as MA and PhD degrees in geography from the Hebrew University of Jerusalem. His Master's thesis Residential Distribution and Internal Migration of Arab Residents in Haifa was approved in 1979. His doctoral thesis Planning and Development of the Physical Pattern of Jewish Settlements in Israel, 1882–1914 was approved in 1984. He spent his post-doctoral studies at the University of Tübingen in Germany, where he researched the cultural landscape of the German Templer villages that emigrated to Palestine and settled there in the 19th century.

== Academic career ==
Ben-Artzi was appointed as a lecturer at the University of Haifa in 1984. He was promoted to senior lecturer in 1989, associate professor in 1995, and full professor in 2004. He served as the Head of the Department of Israel Studies for five years and as the Dean of the Faculty of Humanities for four years. Between 2004 and 2010, he served as the Rector of the University of Haifa. As rector, he was among the founders of the Havatzalot Program, the flagship program of the Intelligence Corps, in 2004. In 2010, he took a sabbatical at Emmanuel College, Cambridge, UK, and at The Taub Center for Israel Studies at New York University. As of May 2018, he serves as the head of the IDF Military Colleges Administration at the University of Haifa.

== Public positions and activism ==
Ben-Artzi held numerous voluntary public positions and was a member of many public bodies. He served on the Council for a Beautiful Israel's Haifa and Northern branch, where he compiled the first list of historical sites worthy of preservation in Haifa. This list was adopted by the municipality and serves as the basis for the list of conservation sites in the city. From 1979, he has been a member of the Haifa Municipality's Street Names Committee, and from 2004 to 2018, he served as its chairman. He was the Chairman of the Kishon River Council and Chairman of several Border Division Committees between Local Authorities on behalf of the Ministry of the Interior, including Chairman of the Commission of Inquiry into the Boundaries of Kiryat Shmona from 1997 to 1998. Ben-Artzi served for many years as a representative of the public on the Haifa Municipality's Committee for the Preservation of Sites from 1993 to 2018. He also served as a member of the Heritage Committee of the plenum of the Israel Nature and Parks Authority, the Dukhifat Foundation, the Hamizgaga Association in Nahsholim, and the Heritage Preservation Committee of the Israel Antiquities Authority. Since January 2018, he has served as Chairman of the Executive Committee of the Society for the Protection of Nature in Israel.

Ben-Artzi was a member of the Democratic Movement for Change Council for a short period when it was established in 1977. He was one of the founders of the Peace Now movement and a key activist in it from 1978 to 1989. In 1979, before the Egypt–Israel peace treaty, the leaders of the movement visited Cairo at the personal invitation of Egyptian President Anwar Sadat. He has been active in the protest movement in Israel against the judicial overhaul plan since January 2023. During the Gaza war, Prof. Ben Artzi, alongside renowned academics such as Prof. Yuval Noah Harari, Prof. David Harel, Prof. Benjamin Z. Kedar, Prof. Benny Morris, and Prof. Anita Shapira, publicly advocated for the creation of temporary centers to house Palestinians displaced by the fighting. Their collective appeal emphasized the need to address the humanitarian crisis and provide immediate shelter for those affected by the violence.

== Research ==
- Residential Patterns and Intra-Urban Migration of Arabs in Haifa (1980)
- Early Jewish Settlements Patterns in Palestine, 1882–1914
- From Germany to the Holy Land: Templer Settlement in Palestine
- The Creation of the Carmel as a Segregated Jewish Residential Space in Haifa, 1918–1948
- Mount Carmel of Graf von Mülinen
- Rural Jewish Settlement in Cyprus 1883–1939
