= Wilhelma, Palestine =

German Templer colony in Ottoman Palestine

Coordinates: 32°1′24″N 34°54′49″E

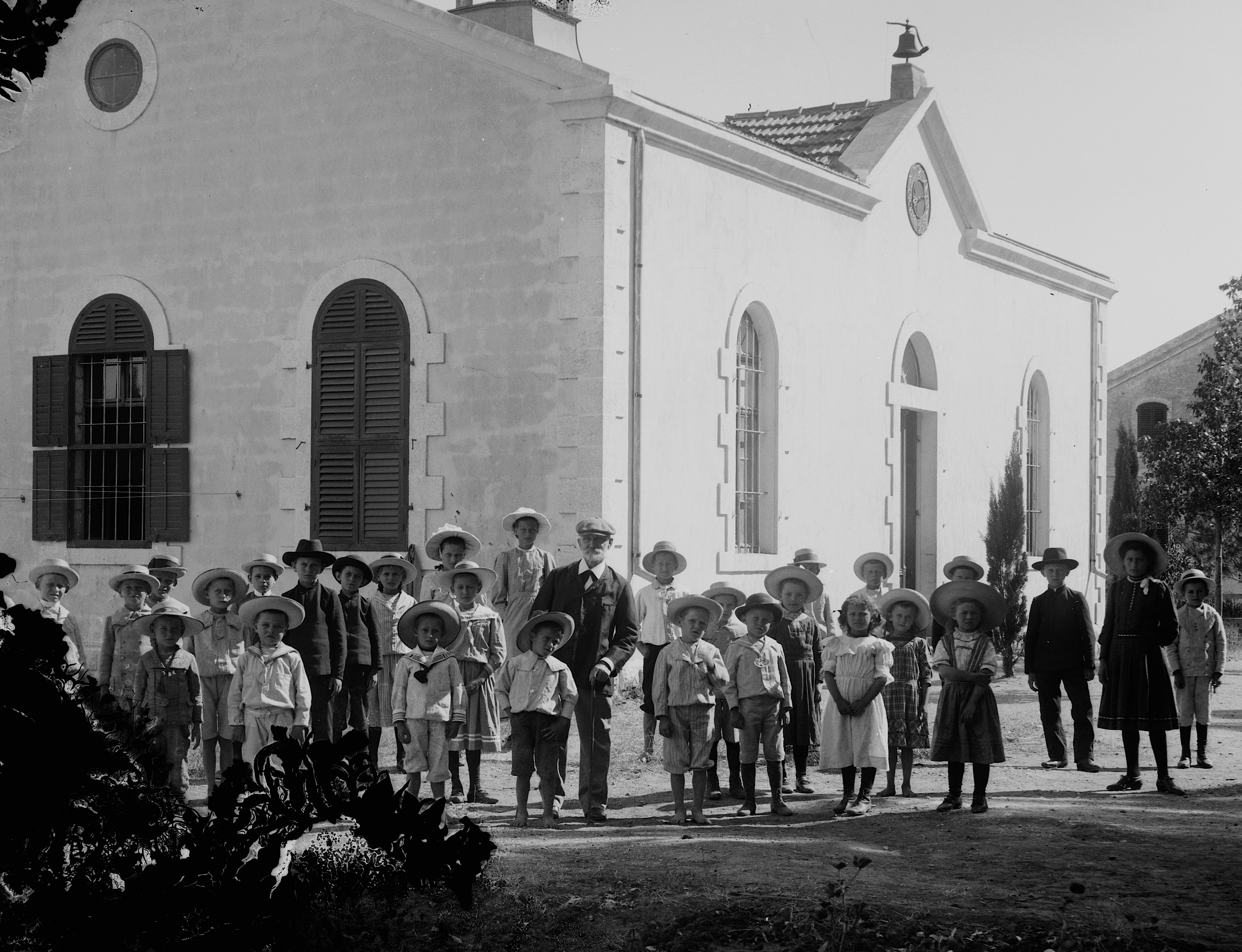
The Templers outside their community centre

Wilhelma (Hebrew: וילהלמה), originally Wilhelma-Hamîdije, was a German Templer Colony in Palestine, located southwest of al-'Abbasiyyah near Jaffa.

== History ==
Wilhelma was established by German settlers in 1902 in Palestine then under Ottoman rule. Wilhelma-Hamîdije was named in honour of King William II of Württemberg, Emperor Wilhelm II and Sultan Abdul Hamid II, however, only the first half of the name prevailed.

In July 1918 the German residents of Wilhelma were interned at Helouan, near Cairo in Egypt. They were returned to Palestine in January 1921.

During the inter-war years the colony produced dairy goods and wine in collaboration with the German colony at Sarona.

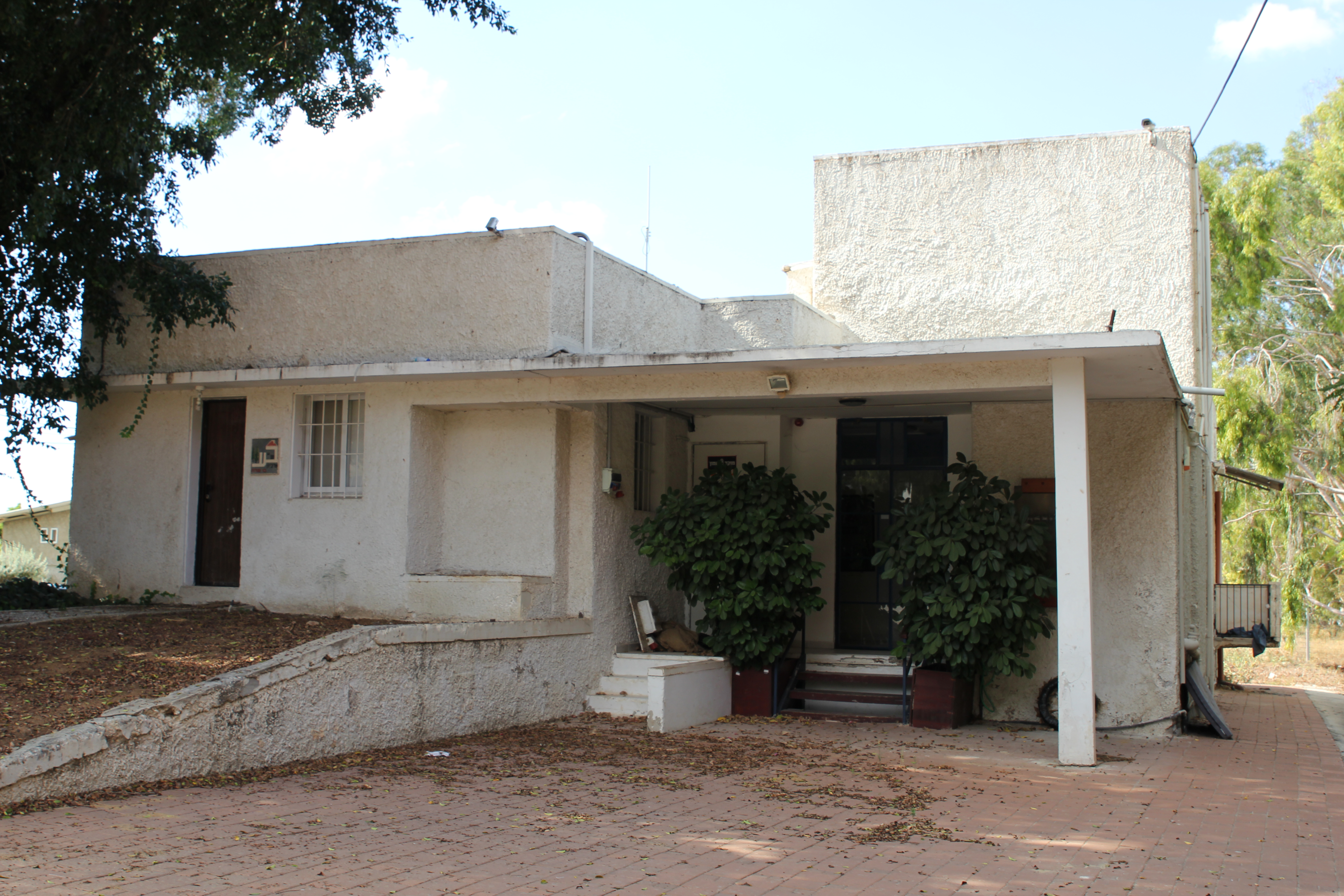
The first dairy building was constructed in 1936 and used to process milk for sale.

At the time of the 1922 census of Palestine, Wilhelma had a population of 186 Christians, 36 Muslims and 1 Jew. By the 1931 census, there were 319 residents in 65 occupied houses, the population consisted of 231 Christians, 84 Muslims, and 4 Jews.

During World War II, Wilhelma was transformed into an internment camp by the British Mandatory authorities where German settlers from Wilhelma and other localities such as Sarona as well as other enemy aliens (such as Hungarians and Italians) were concentrated and held. In World War II, guarded by Jewish police, the camp was under an early night curfew. Detainees were held there until April 1948 when the last of them were moved out to Germany or resettled in Australia.

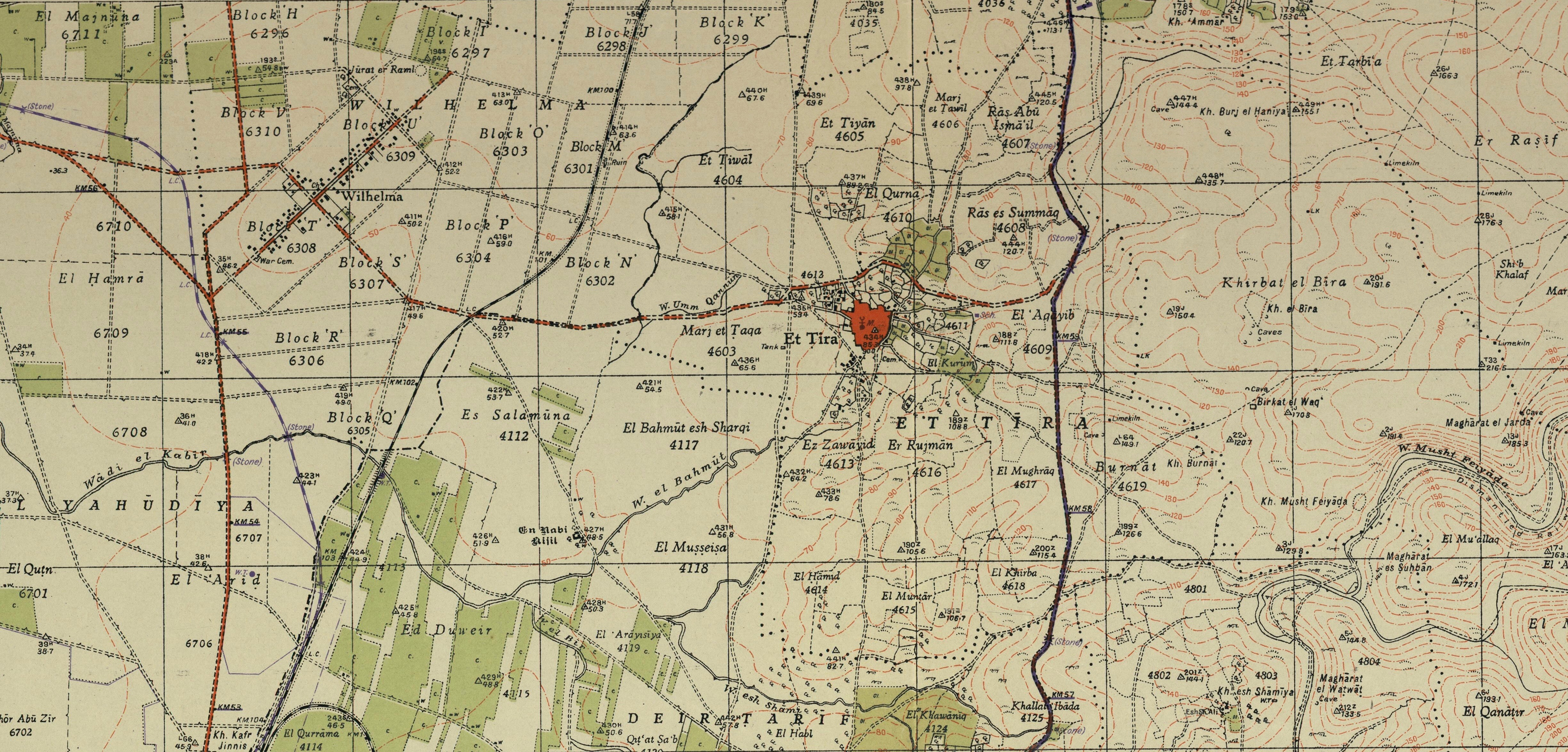
Wilhelma 1942 1:20,000

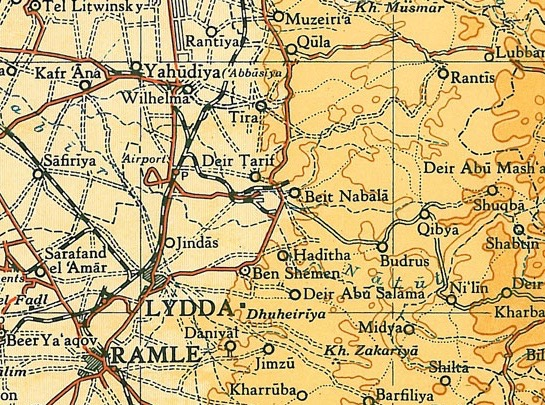
Wilhelma 1945 1:250,000

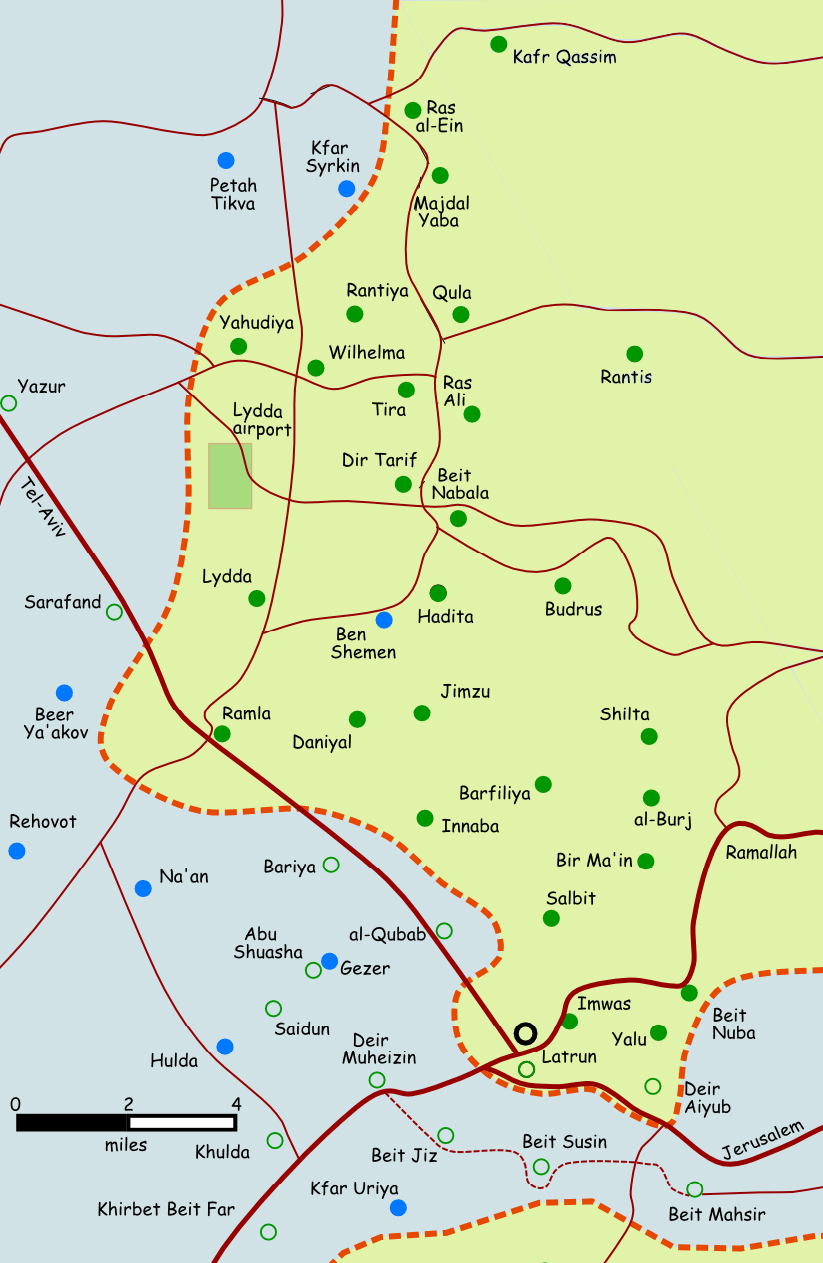
Depopulated villages in the Ramle Subdistrict

Three Jewish moshavim were established on the village's land in 1948. The first was abandoned on 15 May 1948, after being overrun by the Arab Legion. The second was established by a Hapoel HaMizrachi group. The third was established by the Tehiya group of Hapoel HaMizrachi. Wilhelma is now the site of the Israeli locality of Bnei Atarot.

In 1949 an attempt was made to re-establish Kibbutz Be'erot Yitzhak on the remains of Wilhema. Then the kibbutz moved to its present site in central Israel in 1952.

Ben Gurion International Airport was originally named "Lydda Airport" when it was built in 1934 near the Templar community. It was renamed RAF Station Lydda in 1943. During World War II it served as a major airfield for military air transport and aircraft ferry operations between military bases in Europe, Africa, the Middle East (mainly Iraq and Persia) and South/Southeast Asia.

== Bibliography ==
- Glenk, Helmut; Blaich, Horst; Haering, Manfred (2005), From Desert Sands to Golden Oranges: The History of the German Templer Settlement of Sarona in Palestine 1871-1947 (Illustrated ed.), Trafford Publishing, ISBN 9781412035064
