= Assassination of Gotthilf Wagner =

1946 murder of German Templer leader

On 22 March 1946, Gotthilf Wagner, the leader of the German Templer colonies in Palestine, was assassinated by the Haganah as part of the Jewish Resistance Movement.

The British Criminal Investigation Department concluded that the assassination was influenced by Wagner's decision to instruct the population of Sarona not to sell any land to Jews. Wagner had previously been a member of the Nazi Party; this was given as a motive by some press reports at the time.

The assassination was intended to drive the Germans out of Palestine; it "sent shockwaves" through the community and was followed by two subsequent assassinations in 1948.

== Events ==
On March 22, 1946, five members of the Palmach, acting on the orders of Yitzhak Sadeh, ambushed Wagner and shot him while driving with a police escort from the Wilhelma Detention Camp near the Lydda airport. As his car entered the outlying streets of Tel Aviv, it slowed down on account of heavy traffic. Two men darted out from each side and approached the car. One of them fired a shot which mortally wounded Wagner who then collapsed over the steering wheel of the car. Four men were seen running away through the crowd.

Wagner had been heading for Sarona to pay the wages of Arabs laborers and even though he had £800 with him, none of the money was taken.
