= German Templer colonies in Palestine =

Historic Templers community

The German Templer colonies in Palestine were the settlements established in Ottoman Palestine and Mandatory Palestine by the German Pietist Templer movement in the late 19th and early 20th century. During and shortly after World War II, these colonies were depopulated, and its German residents deported to Australia.

At its height, the Templer community in Palestine numbered 2,000.

== History ==
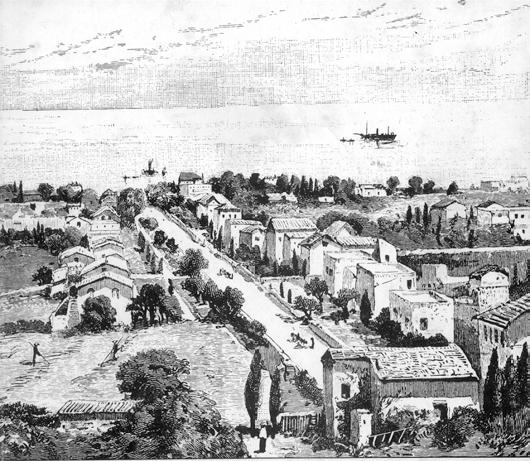
German colony in Haifa, 1875.

=== Templer Colony in Haifa ===
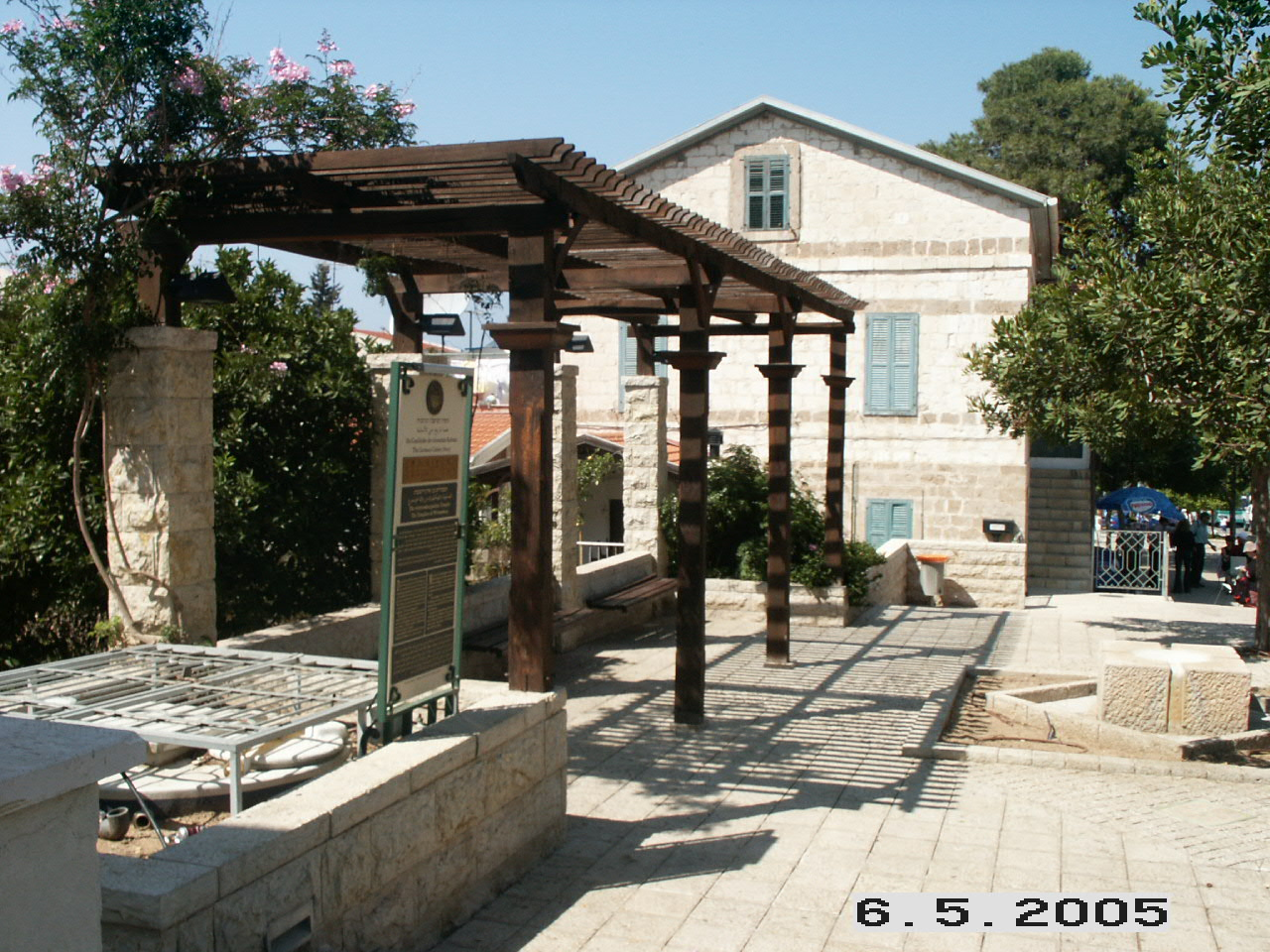
One of the Templer restored house on David Ben Gurion BLVD.

On 6 August 1868, the founders of the Templers, Christoph Hoffmann and Georg David Hardegg, their families and a group of fellow Templers, left Germany for Palestine, landing in Haifa on 30 October. They had already come to the conclusion that basing themselves in Jerusalem wouldn't be practical, planning to settle nearby, close to Nazareth, but during their journey they were advised that Haifa would be more suitable, having a good harbor and climate.

Hoffmann and Hardegg purchased land at the foot of Mount Carmel and established a colony there in 1868. At the time, Haifa had a population of 4,000. The Templers are credited today with promoting the development of the city. The colonists built an attractive main street that was much admired by the locals. It was 30 meters wide and planted with trees on both sides. The houses, designed by architect Jacob Schumacher, were built of stone, with red-shingled roofs, instead of the flat or domed roofs common in the region. Hard work, the harsh climate and epidemics claimed the lives of many before the colony became self-sustaining. Hardegg stayed in Haifa, while Hoffmann moved on to establish other colonies.

In the same year, Bahá'u'lláh, the prophet-founder of the Baháʼí Faith, arrived in the Haifa-Akka region as a prisoner of the Ottoman Empire. Years later, after his release from strict confinement, he visited the Templer Colony on Mount Carmel several times and wrote a letter to Hardegg. He asked his son, ‘Abdu’l-Baha, to build, on the alignment of the Templer Colony road (Carmel Avenue) with the shrine to the forerunner of the religion, known as "the Bab," halfway up the mountain. The conjunction of the Templer buildings and the Shrine have become the most significant landmark in the modern city of Haifa.

The Templer Cemetery Haifa

In the Haifa cemetery are mainly buried the dead of the nearby "German Colony" (established in 1868) as well as the dead of the daughter colony "Carmelheim" (today the Carmel Center). The cemetery began operating in 1869. From the main path (east-west) a path branches off on a north-south axis, which divides the Templer complex in two and leads to a large monument in memory of the German dead from Haifa who fell in WWI.

=== Jaffa colony ===
Hoffman established a German colony in Jaffa (today part of Tel Aviv-Yafo) in 1869. It was built at the site of a former settlement by United States Christians, which had been abandoned by then, for which reason the area is known today as the American-Germany colony of Tel Aviv. A Protestant church – Immanuel Church – and a German Consulate were built in the colony by the local German Templer residents.

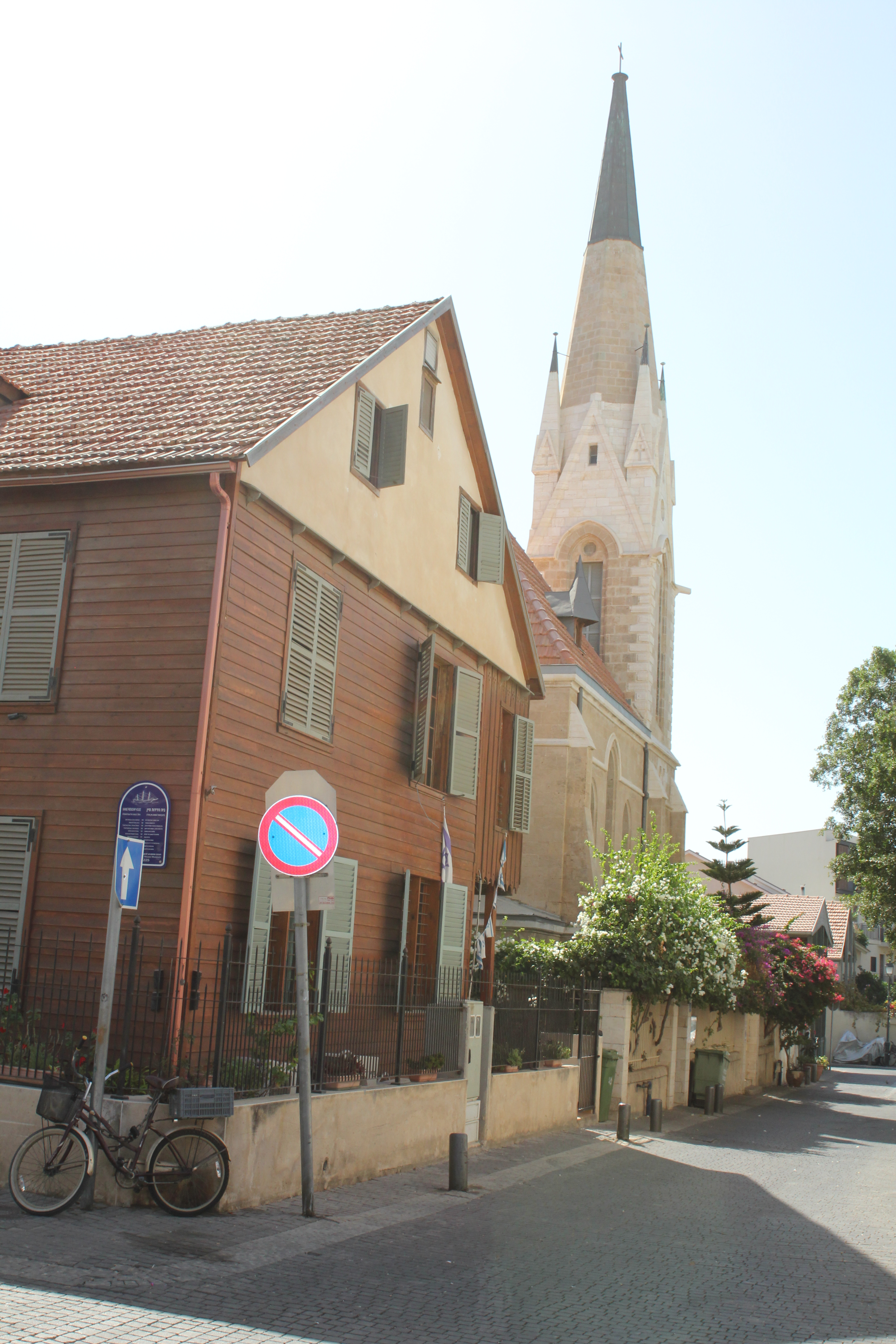
Maine Friendship House part of the first American Colony in Jaffa sold to the German Colony.

Maine Friendship House is a historic building made of wood and stone in the American-German colony in Jaffa, which currently stands at 10 Auerbach Street.

The colony's oranges were the first to carry a "Jaffa" label, one of the better known agricultural brands* in Europe, used to market Israeli oranges to this day.

*"The “Jaffa Oranges” brand now enjoys explicit and specific protection under a joint global and local legal regime. But its origins emerged under a complex economic-legal setting saturated with commercial and national rivalries."

=== Sarona and Jerusalem ===
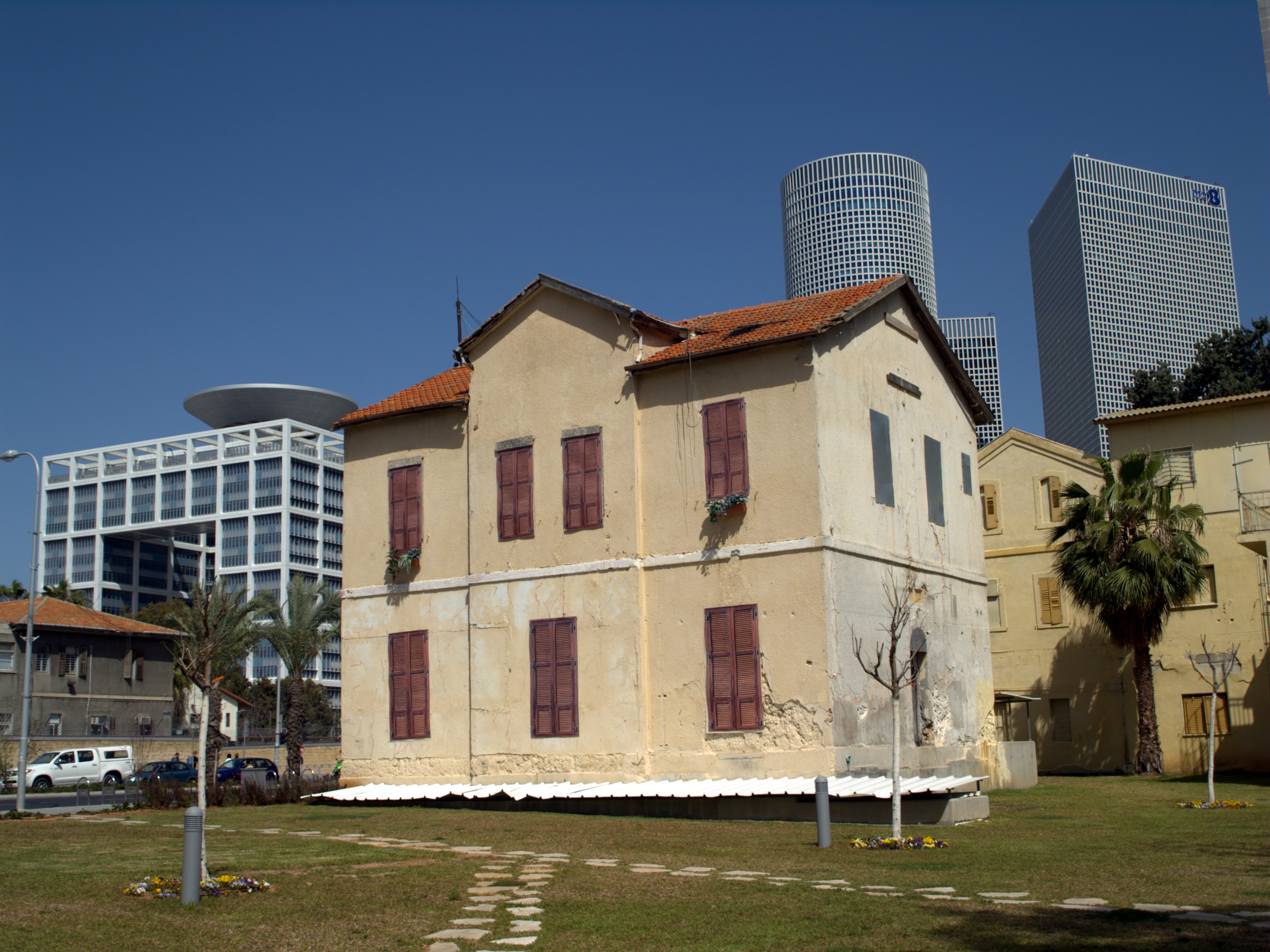
The remains of Templer buildings of Sarona in HaKirya, Tel Aviv

In 1871, a third colony was set up in Sarona, as the Templers' first agricultural colony, on the road from Jaffa to Nablus. In 1873 a fourth colony was established in the Valley of Refaim outside Jerusalem's Old City.

The Templers established a regular coach service between Haifa and the other cities, promoting the country's tourist industry, and made an important contribution to road construction.

=== Kaiser Wilhelm visit and the founding of Wilhelma, Walhalla, Bethlehem of Galilee and Waldheim ===
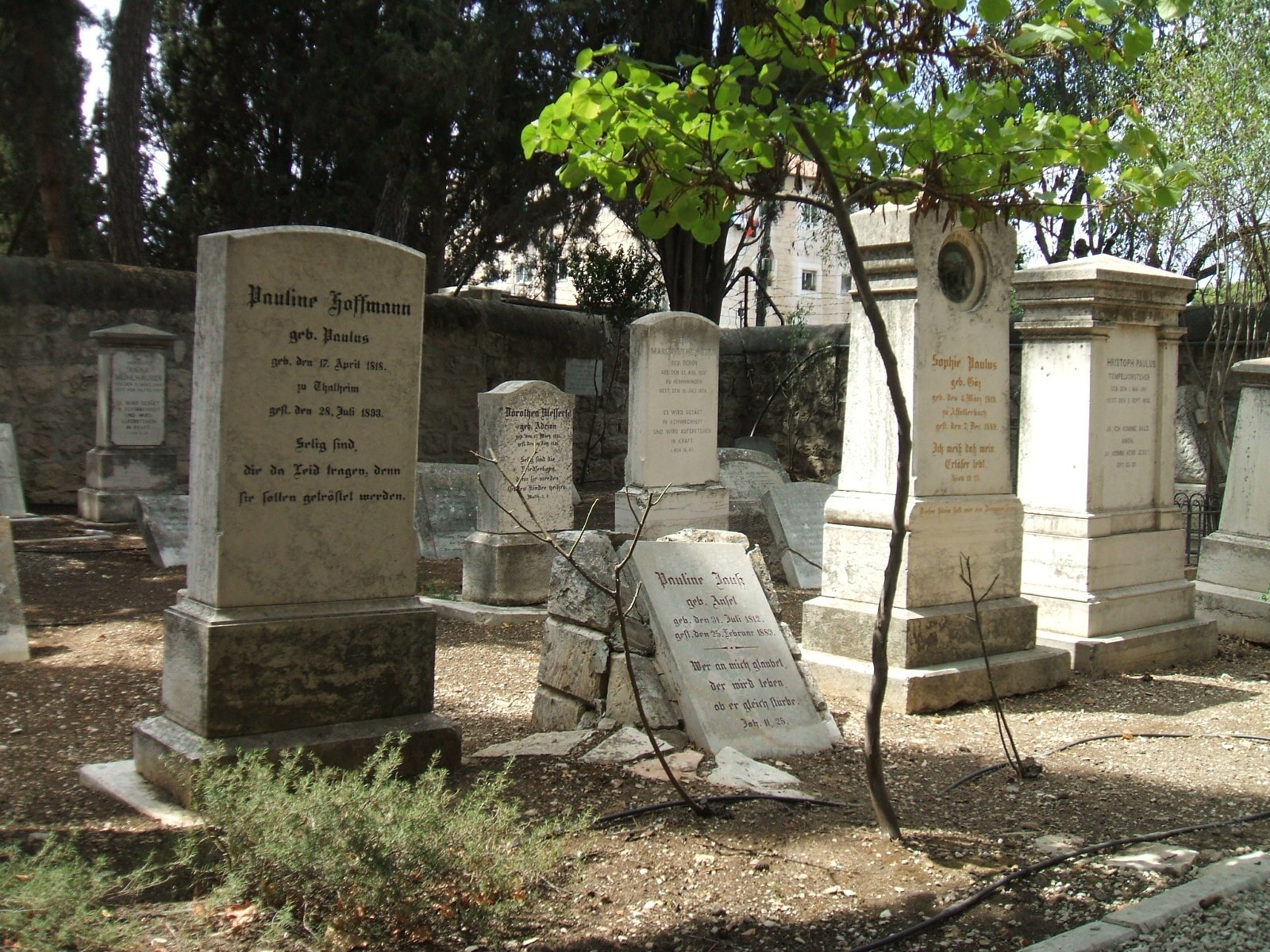
Templer Cemetery in the German Colony, Jerusalem

After the 1898 visit of Kaiser Wilhelm II of Germany, one of his traveling companions, Colonel Joseph von Ellrichshausen, initiated the formation of a society for the advancement of the German settlements in Palestine, named the Gesellschaft zur Förderung der deutschen Ansiedlungen in Palästina, in Stuttgart. It enabled the settlers to acquire land for new settlements by offering them low interest loans.

A second wave of pioneer settlers founded Wilhelma (now Bnei Atarot) in 1902 near Lod, Walhalla (1903) near the original Jaffa colony, followed by Bethlehem of Galilee (1906).

The German Settlement Society successfully encouraged some of the Templers to return into the official, national Protestant Church. The non-Templer colony of Waldheim (now Alonei Abba) was subsequently founded next to Bethlehem of Galilee in 1907 by proselytized Templers now affiliated with the Old-Prussian State Church.

=== WWI internment ===
In July and August 1918 the British authorities sent 850 Templers to an internment camp at Helwan near Cairo in Egypt. In April 1920, 350 of these internees were deported to Germany. All the property of the Templers of enemy nationality (thus except of that of a few US citizens among them) was taken into public custodianship. With the establishment of a regular British administration in 1918 Edward Keith-Roach became the Public Custodian of Enemy Property in Palestine, who rented out the property and collected the rents.

In April 1920 the Allies convened at the Conference of San Remo and agreed on the British rule in Palestine, followed by the official establishment of the civil administration on 1 July 1920. From that date on Keith-Roach transferred the collected rents for property in custodianship to the actual proprietors. On June 29, 1920, the British Foreign Secretary, Lord Curzon, informed the British Upper House that Great Britain agreed in principle to their return to Palestine.

The 1922 census of Palestine lists 724 German Templers (listed as "Templars Community"), with 697 in Jerusalem-Jaffa and 27 in Northern. Census data on church membership lists 117 in Jerusalem, 196 in Jaffa, 6 in Mas'udiyeh, 202 in Sarona, 176 in Wilhelma, 9 in Nev Herduf, 1 in Nazareth, and 17 in Tiberias.

The League of Nations legitimised the British administration and custodianship by granting a mandate to Britain in 1922, which Turkey, the Ottoman successor, finally ratified by the Treaty of Lausanne, signed on 24 July 1923 and becoming effective on 5 August 1925. Thus the public custodianship ended in the same year and the prior holders achieved the fully protected legal position as proprietors.

The Mandate government and the Public Custodian of Enemy Property paid them 50% restitution for war losses of livestock and other property. The Bank of the Temple Society, formed in 1925 with its head office in Jaffa and branches in Haifa and Jerusalem, became one of the leading credit institutions in Palestine.

=== Nazi influence ===
After the Nazi takeover in Germany the new Reich's government streamlined foreign policy according to Nazi ideals, imposed and regulated financially. The Nazi emphasis was on creating the image that Germany and Germanness were equal to Nazism. Thus, all non-Nazi aspects of German culture and identity were discriminated against as un-German. All international schools of German language subsidised or fully financed by government funds were obliged to redraw their educational programs and to solely employ teachers aligned to the Nazi Party. The teachers in Bethlehem were financed by the Reich government, so Nazi teachers also took over there.

In 1933 Templer functionaries and other Germans living in Palestine appealed to Paul von Hindenburg and the Foreign Office not to use swastika symbols for German institutions, though without success. Some German Gentiles from Palestine pleaded with the Reich government to drop its plan to boycott Jewish owned shops, in April 1933. Some Templers enlisted in the German Army. By 1938, 17% of the Templers in Palestine were members of the Nazi Party. According to historian Yossi Ben-Artzi, "The members of the younger generation to some extent broke away from naive religious belief, and were more receptive to the Nazi German nationalism. The older ones tried to fight it."

=== Internment, deportation and exchanges ===
At the beginning of World War II colonists with German citizenship were rounded up by the British authorities and sent, together with Italian and Hungarian enemy aliens, to internment camps in Waldheim and Bethlehem of Galilee. On 31 July 1941, 661 Templers and other Germans in Palestine were deported to Australia via Egypt, leaving behind 345 in Palestine. Likewise the British authorities declared the Templers enemy nationals, arresting and deporting many of them to Australia. During the war the British government brokered the exchange of about 1,000 Templers for 550 Jews under German control. These Jews were mostly Palestinian or residents with relatives in Palestine.

=== Assassinations ===
On 12 March 1946 a team from the Zionist Haganah assassinated the leader of the community, Gotthilf Wagner, considered by Palestinian Jews to be an ardent member of the Nazi Party, although his family and the wider Templer community argued otherwise. Later four more members of the sect were murdered in order to drive the group from Palestine. The former Templer colonies were re-settled by Jews.

=== Creation of Israel ===
After its foundation, the State of Israel—with the fresh memory of the Holocaust—was adamant in not permitting any ethnic Germans of a community which had expressed pro-Nazi sympathies to remain in or return to its territory.

In 1962 the State of Israel paid DM54 million in compensation to property owners whose assets were nationalized. Sarona was incorporated into Tel Aviv, part of it becoming the compound of the Israeli Ministry of Defense and the IDF High Command Headquarters, while the other part housed various civil offices of the Israeli government, using the original German houses. In the early 21st century the civil offices were evacuated, and the area extensively renovated, becoming a pedestrian shopping and entertainment area.

== Timeline ==
- 1861: Plans for a move to Palestine were considered were immediately on establishment of the Temple Society
- 1867: An independent settlement at Samunieh had tragic consequences: of the 25 persons in the group 15 died within a year, 7 in Medjedel and 8 in Samunieh.
- 1869-70: German Colony, Haifa, became a settlement of mixed denominational affiliation
- 1869-70: German Colony, Jaffa
- 1872: Sarona, became a settlement of mixed denominational affiliation
- 1874: The Temple denomination underwent a schism.
- 1878: German Colony, Jerusalem, became a settlement of mixed denominational affiliation. First settlers in 1873, became a colony in 1878.
- 1903: Walhalla in Jaffa, north of the first colony.
- 1902: Wilhelma, a monodenominational settlement of only Templer colonists
- 1906: Bethlehem of Galilee, a monodenominational settlement of only Templer colonists
- 1907: Waldheim, a monodenominational settlement of only Protestant-church affiliated colonists
- 1921: Templers who had been interned in Helouan, Egypt, towards the end of World War I returned to their settlements in Palestine, now a British Mandate. The settlements soon flourished again.
- 1939: German Templers were interned in Palestine at the outbreak of World War II.
- 1941: Over 500 Templers from Palestine were transported to Australia, where internment continued in Tatura, Victoria, until 1946–7. In December, 65 persons take part in an exchange program from Palestine to Germany.
- 1942: 302 persons take part in an exchange program from Palestine to Germany.
- 1944: 112 persons take part in an exchange program from Palestine to Germany.
- 1948: Formation of the State of Israel. Templers were not allowed return there, those left had to leave.

== Overview ==
=== Table ===
Colony	Established	Location	Population (1945)			Maps	
Colony	Established	Location	Christians	Muslims	Total	Close up	Wider area
City colonies
German Colony, Haifa	1869	Haifa	Unknown			A map	A map
German Colony, Jaffa	1869	Jaffa	Unknown			A map	A map
Germany Colony, Jerusalem	1878	Jerusalem	Unknown			A map	A map
Agricultural colonies
Sarona	1872	Jaffa outskirts	150		150	A map	A map
Wilhelma	1902	Jaffa outskirts	240		240	A map	A map
Bethlehem of Galilee	1906	Haifa outskirts	160	210	370	A map	A map
Waldheim (non-Templer)	1907	Haifa outskirts	110	150	260	A map	A map

=== Maps ===
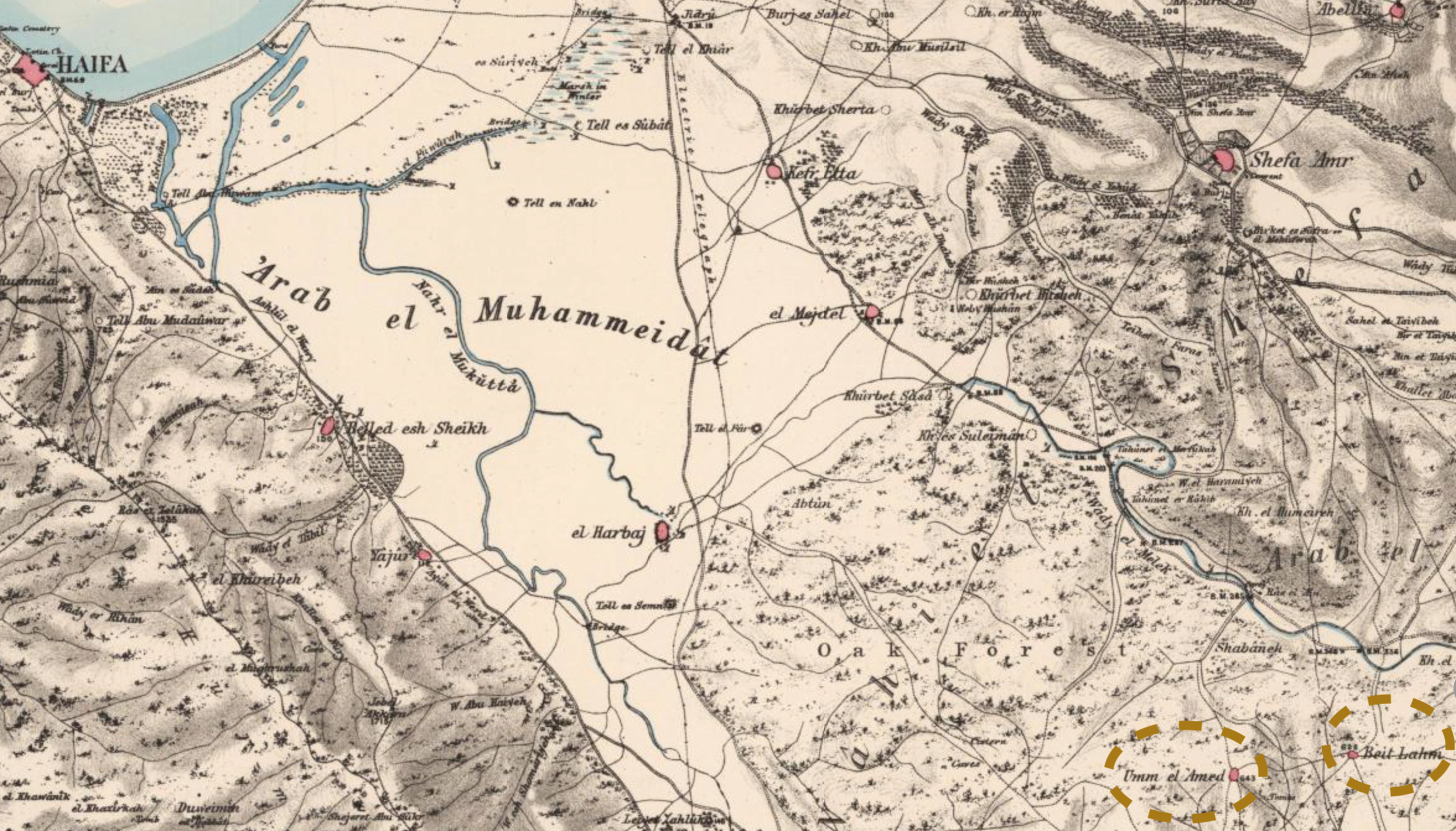
Location of Beit Lahm (Bethlehem) and Waldheim (see khaki circles), two later-established German colonies from the hinterland of Haifa, on the PEF Survey of Palestine

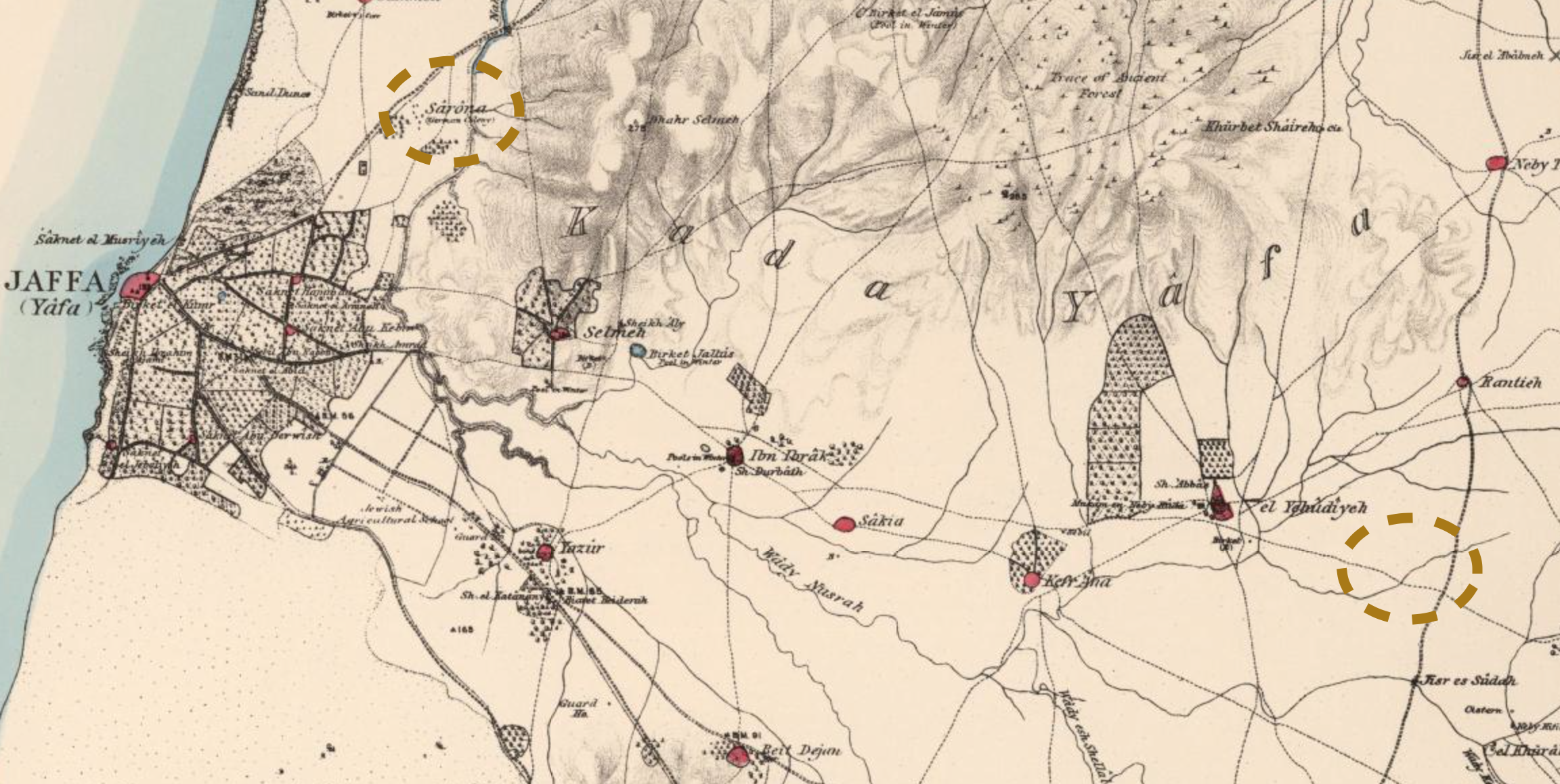
Location of Sarona and Wilhelma (see khaki circles), later-established German Templer colonies from the hinterland of Haifa, in the PEF Survey of Palestine

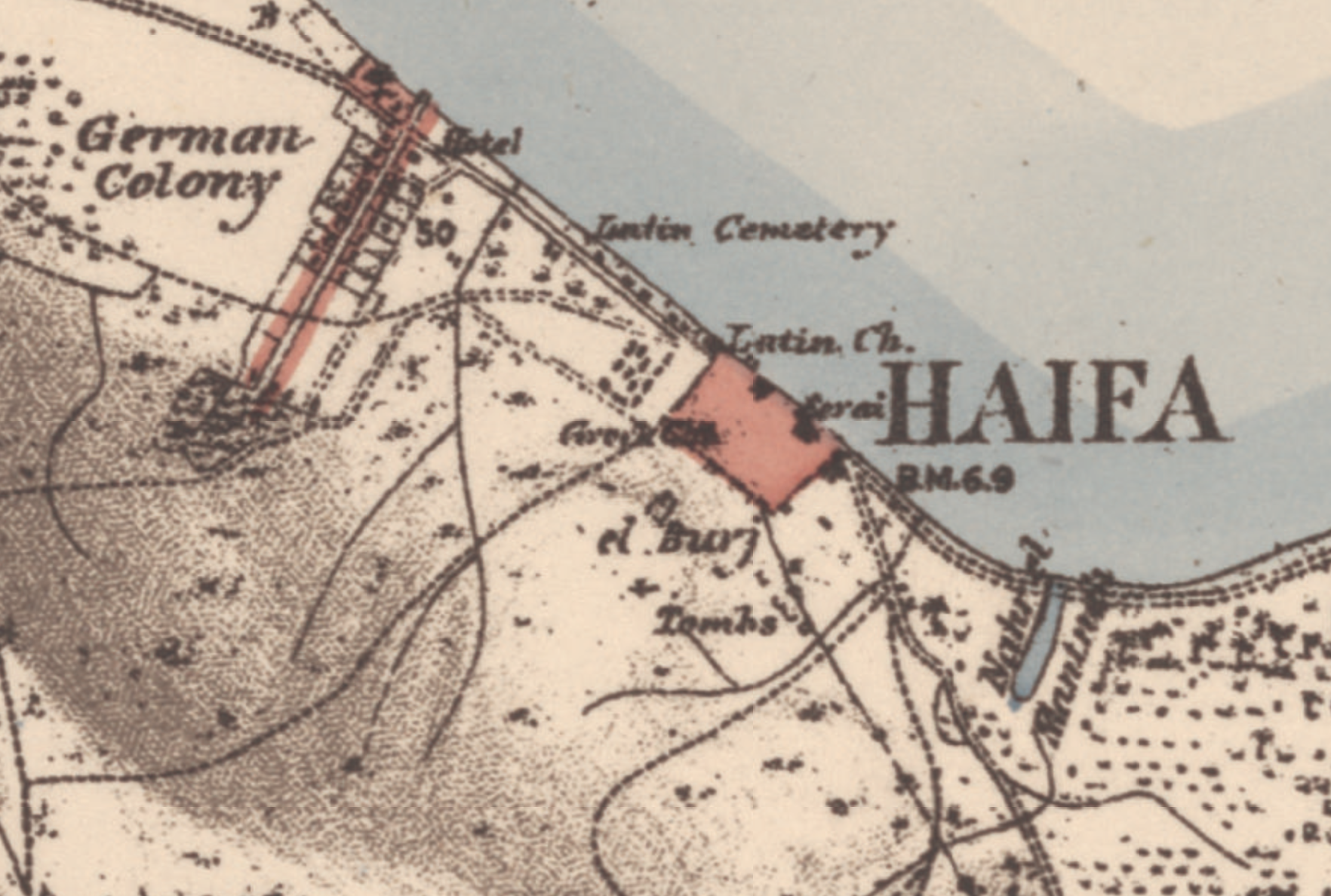
Haifa colony in the PEF Survey of Palestine

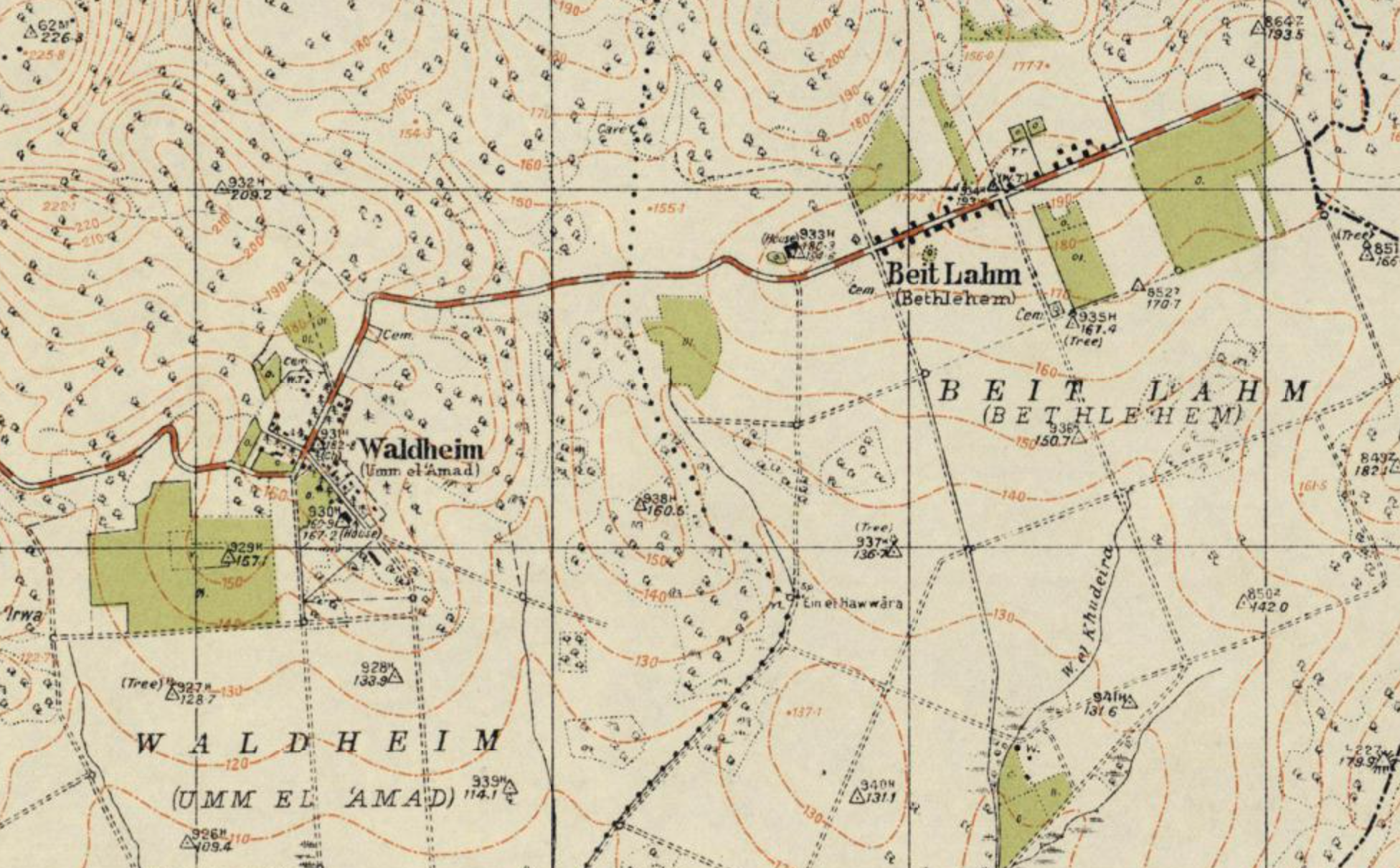
Waldheim and Beit Lahm (Bethlehem)

== See also ==
- Anglo-Prussian bishopric in Jerusalem (1841-1886)
- Christ Church, Jerusalem, oldest Protestant church in the Middle East, established together by German and British Protestants
- Evangelical Lutheran Church in Jordan and the Holy Land, post-1948 church organisation
- Schneller Orphanage, German Protestant "Syrian Orphanage" in Jerusalem
- British Israelism

== Bibliography ==
- The Templers: German settlers who left their mark on Palestine, Raffi Berg, BBC News Magazine, 12 July 2013
- Footprints of the Templers: The Württemberg Templers in the Holy Land
- The Architecture of the Templers in their Colonies in Eretz-Israel, 1868-1948, and their Settlements in the United States, 1860-1925, PhD Thesis, August 2003
- Alex Carmel (1973). Die Siedlungen der württembergischen Templer in Palästina 1868-1918: ihre lokalpolitischen und internationalen Probleme. W. Kohlhammer. ISBN 978-3-17-001636-1.
