= Sarona, Tel Aviv =

Neighborhood in Tel Aviv, Israel, originally built by the German Templers

Sarona Hebrew: שָׁרוֹנָה, German: Sarona
- Neighborhood of Tel Aviv
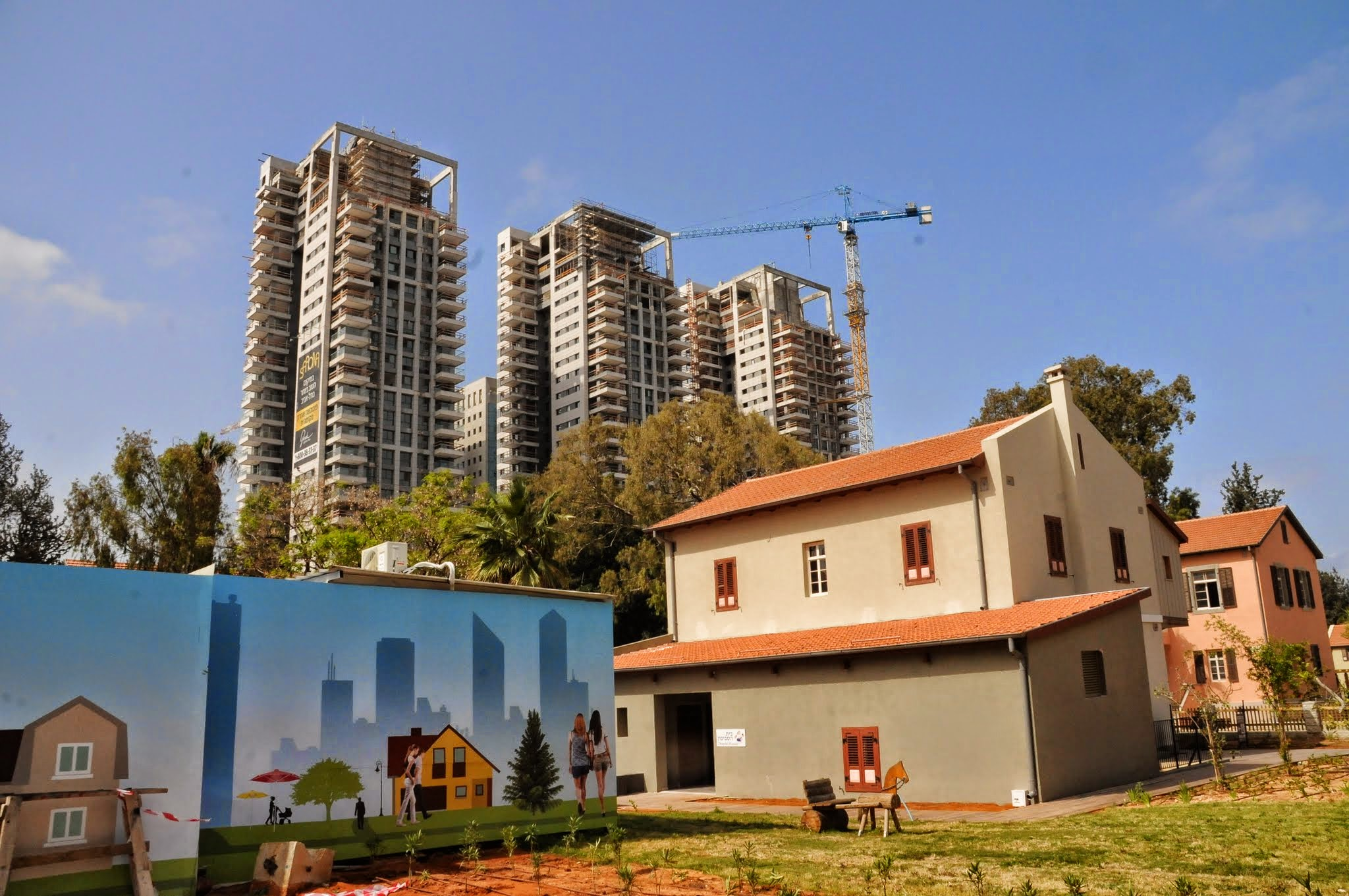
- Sarona under restoration (2014)
- Interactive map of Sarona
- Coordinates: 32°4′21″N 34°47′19″E
- Country: Israel
- District: Tel Aviv
- Foundation: 1871
- Founder: German Templer Society

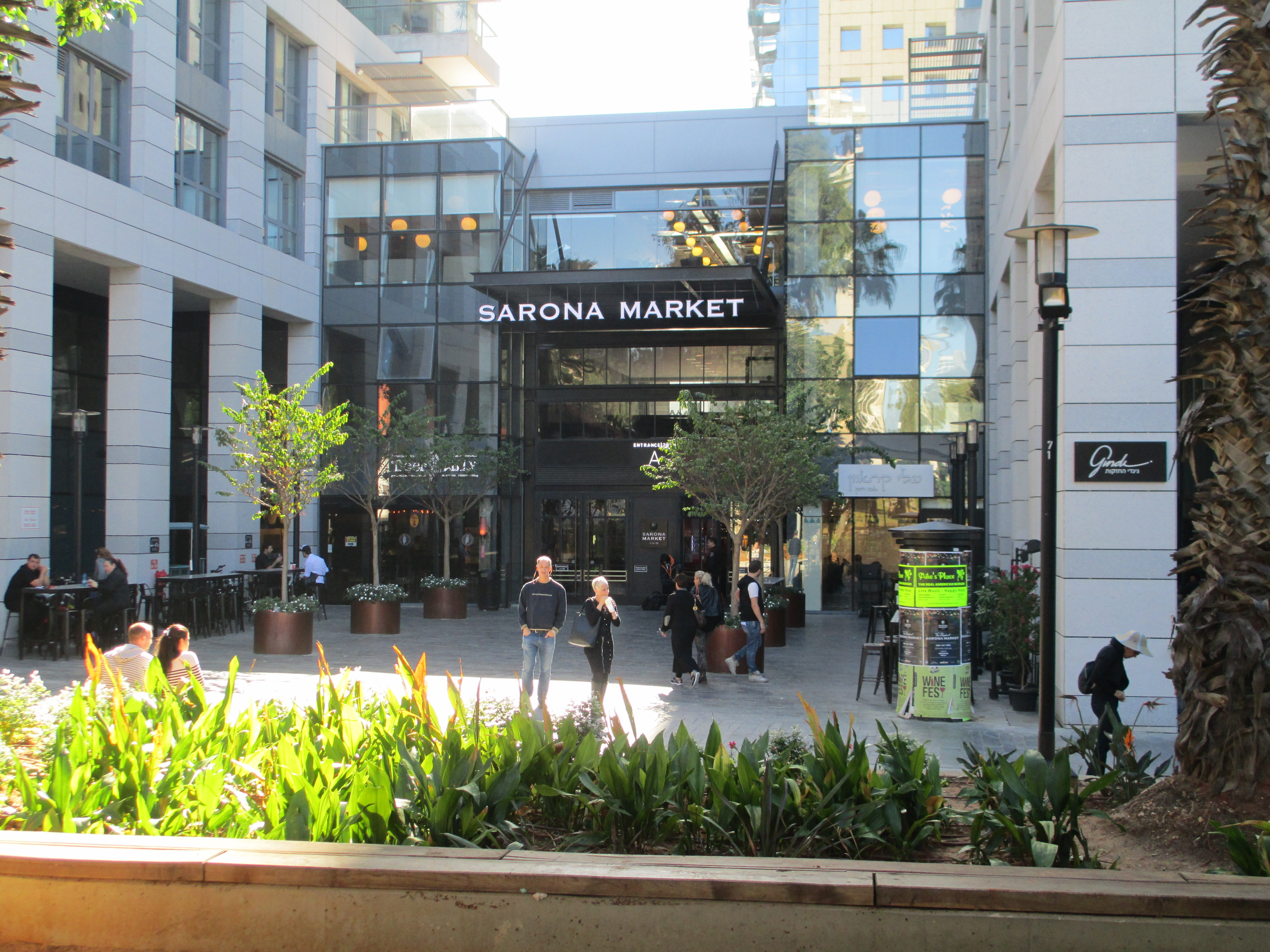
Sarona Market

Sarona (Hebrew: שָׁרוֹנָה) is a neighborhood of Tel Aviv, Israel which started as a German Templer colony in Ottoman Palestine in 1871. It was one of the earliest modern villages established by Europeans in Ottoman Palestine. In July 1941, the British Mandate authorities deported 188 residents of Sarona, who were considered ardent Nazi sympathisers. By the 2000s, the area had fallen into disrepair and was a haven for drug users. However, since 2003, the area has undergone massive renovation, which involved moving and relocating historical buildings before their restoration. The area is now a popular shopping district, as well as home to museums, cultural artifacts centering on its history, and IDF complexes.

== Beginnings in Late Ottoman period ==
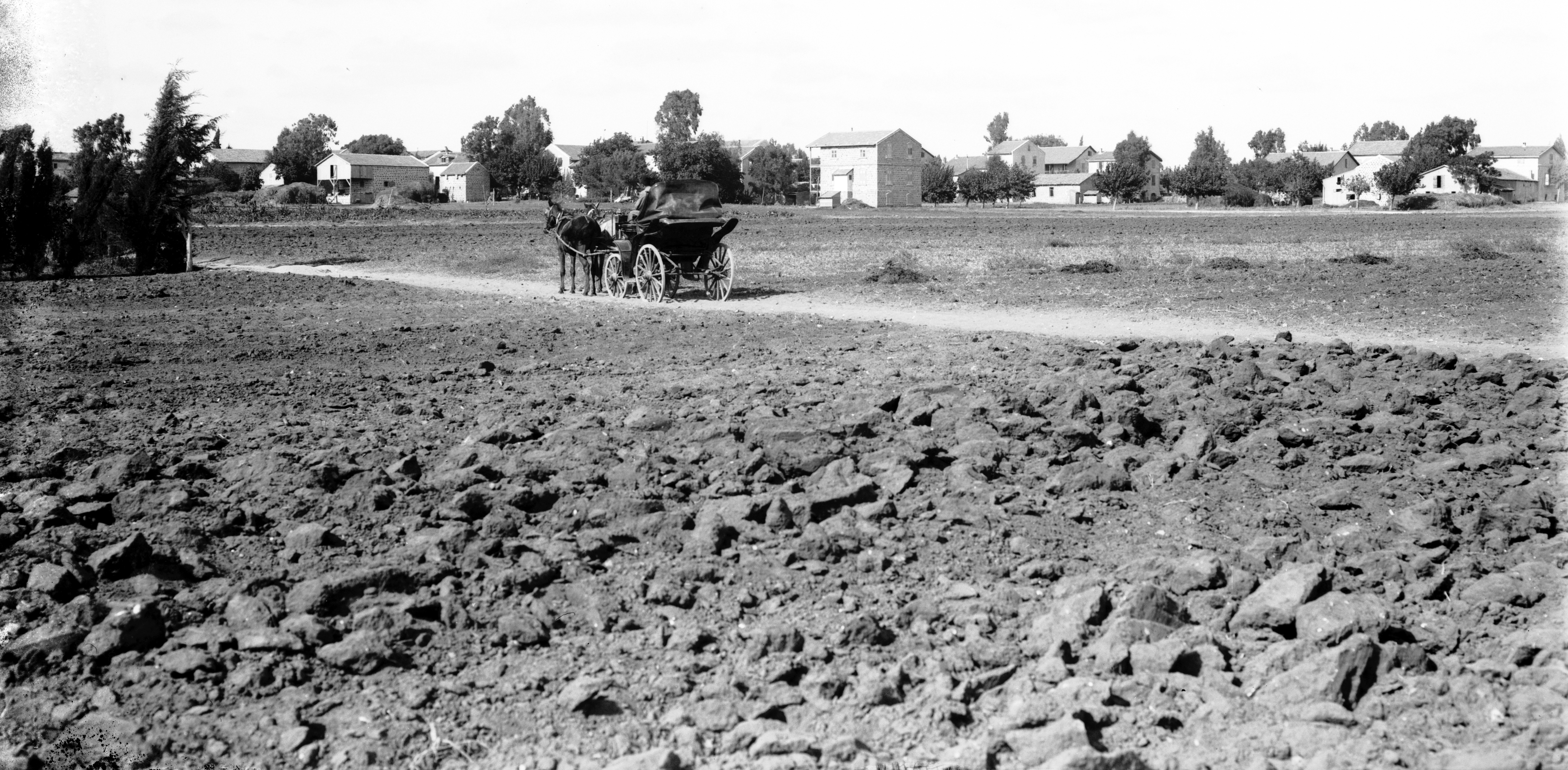
Sarona, early 1900s

In August 1871, the Templers purchased 60 hectares of land from a Greek monastery north of Jaffa. Part of the Plains of Sharon (after which it was named), near the Yarkon River (al-Auja), it was four kilometres from Jaffa. In October 1871, the foundation stones were laid for the first houses. Extreme hardship and disease took a heavy toll in human life during the first few years. Malaria caused the deaths of 28 of the 125 settlers of Sarona in 1872 alone. In an effort to dry the marshy land, 1,300 eucalyptus trees were planted.

By 1889, 269 people lived in Sarona. There were 41 homes, a communal hall, a winery, workshops, barns and sheds. The Sarona colonists brought modern farming tools and practices to the Holy Land. They focused on crops and products they could readily sell. This "agriculture-for-profit" was an economic innovation in a land that for centuries had practiced only self-sustaining farming. Grain crops and dairy industry first, then orchards and vineyards were planted.

In 1895, the colony had seven gardens tended by hired laborers who received one-third of the earnings. A large winery was opened and wines were marketed in Germany. As the dairy farm expanded, milk, cheese, butter and meat were sold in Jaffa. Later, when Jewish wineries began to pose strong competition, the colonists of Sarona replanted their vineyards with citrus.

Faced with a shortage of financial resources for infrastructure development, the community introduced Frondienst, a compulsory work system where every male member was required to do a certain number of hours of community work each month. The building of roads, development of land, roads and drainage and community facilities could thus be scheduled. Researcher and author Sven Hedin wrote of his visit to Sarona in 1916: "...many plants were in blossom. They mainly grow grapes, oranges and vegetables, [but] like in old times they also produce milk and honey."

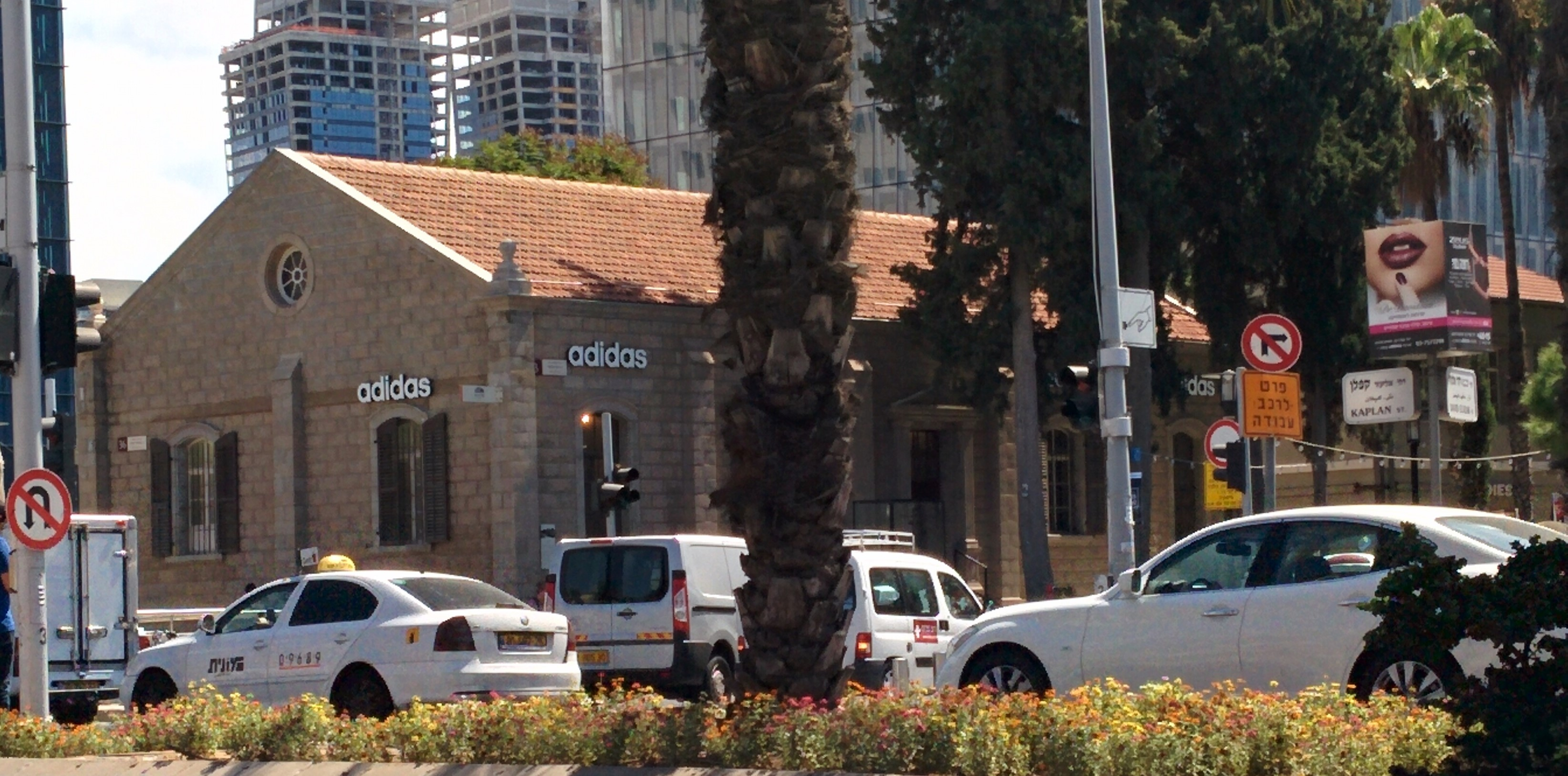
Present day Sarona Community Center.

== British Mandate ==
In November 1917, British troops occupied Sarona, turning the community house into a field hospital and commandeering other buildings for military use. In July 1918, the Templers (a total of 850 people) were interned in Egypt at Helwan near Cairo. The Red Cross, Quakers and Unitarians took up their cause, and on July 29, 1920, after 270 internees had been repatriated in April to Bad Mergentheim in Germany, the House of Lords permitted the remaining internees to return to Palestine. The residents of Sarona returned to a plundered and vandalised colony. Following negotiations with the British authorities, compensation was paid, in some cases up to 50%.

The 1922 census of Palestine lists Sarona's population as 279 (202 Christians, 70 Muslims, and seven Jews).

By 1925 Sarona was still a small settlement, although grown in area. It was still a farming community but more emphasis was placed on trade. With the increasing Jewish immigration to Mandatory Palestine as 80,000 immigrants arrived in 1920-1926 alone, the settlement prospered due to a ready market for its produce and services. The 1931 census of Palestine lists Sarona's population as increased to 564 (272 Christians, 250 Muslims, and 41 Jews) in 104 houses.

=== Third Reich and World War II ===
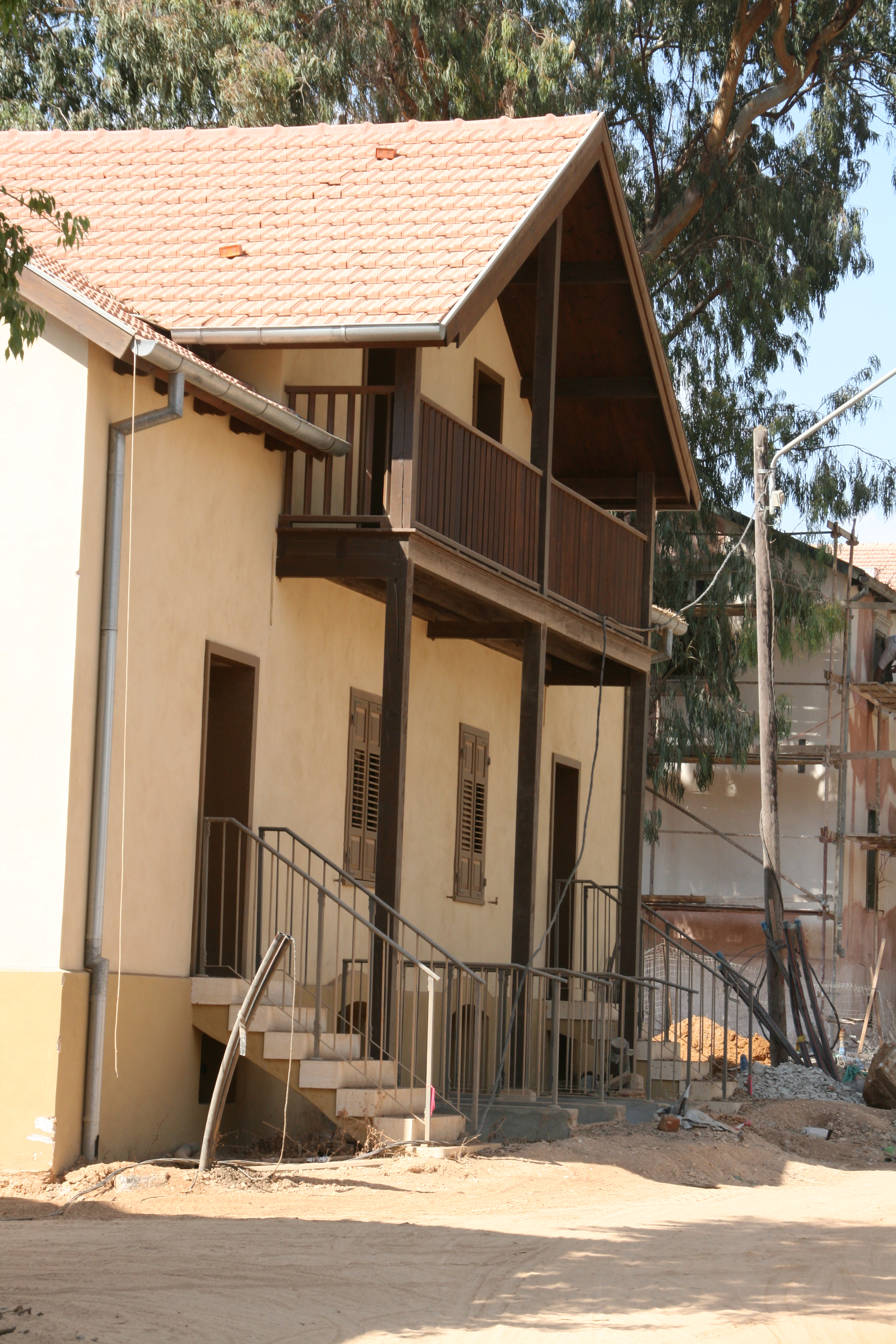
Old Templer houses in Sarona

After the Nazis came to power in Germany, all international schools of German language subsidised or fully financed by government funds were obliged to redraw their educational programmes and employ teachers aligned with the Nazi party. The swastika was used as a symbol in all such institutions.

All Germans living in Mandatory Palestine were interned by the British in Sarona, Wilhelma, Bethlehem of Galilee and Waldheim. Sarona held close to 1,000 persons behind a guarded, 4m high barbed-wire fence. In July 1941, 188 people from Sarona were deported to Australia on the Queen Elizabeth. They were interned in Tatura in Central Victoria, Australia until 1947.

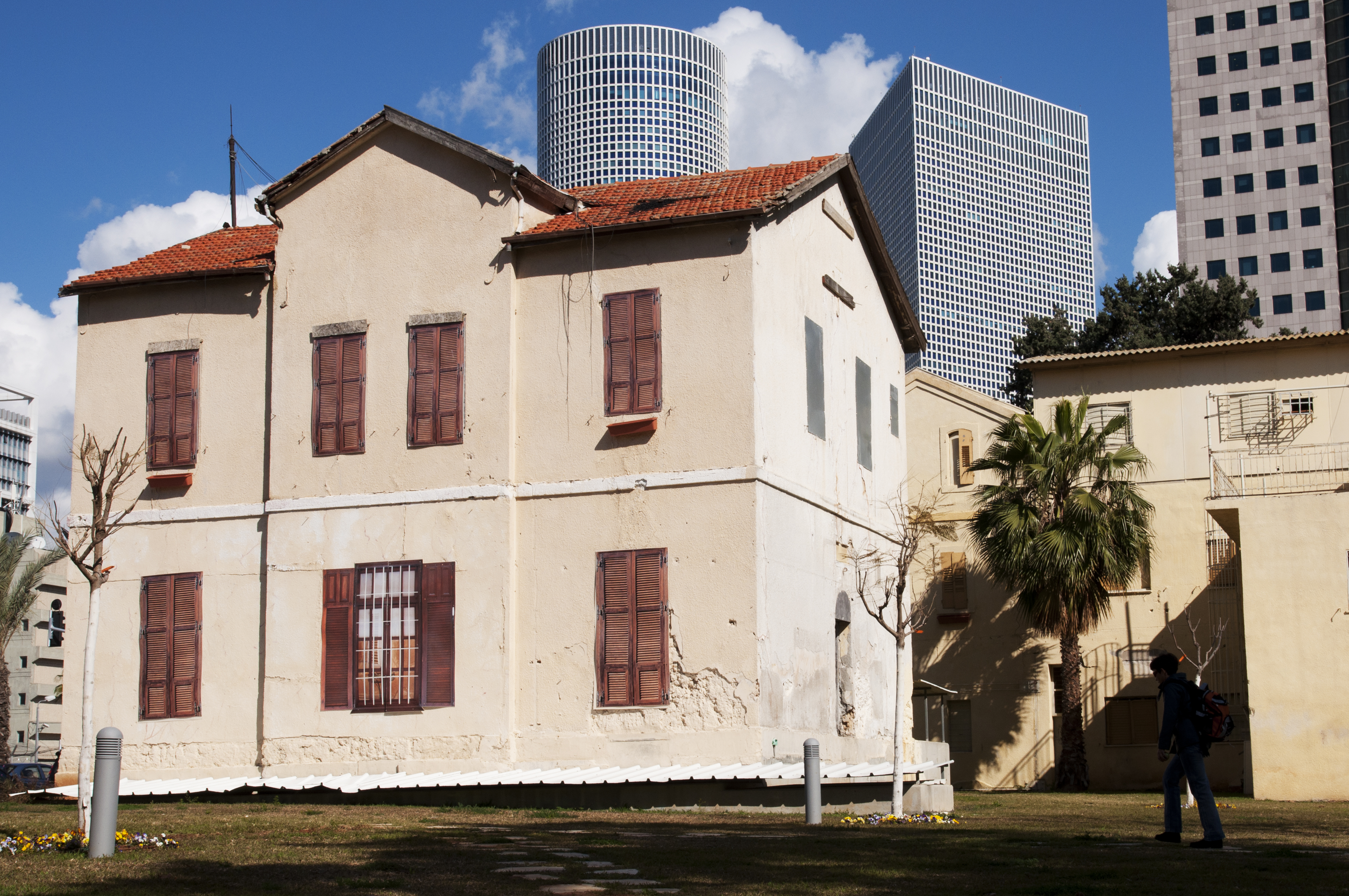
Restored Templer home

Jewish underground organisations, concerned that the German Templers would be allowed to remain in Palestine, mounted a campaign to have them expelled. On May 16, 1943, the Sarona assembly hall was bombed by the Irgun, injuring six people.

On 25 November 1943, Sarona was adopted into Tel Aviv Municipality. By November 1944, most of the remaining Sarona residents had been moved to the camp in Wilhelma. The last group was sent there in September 1945.

=== Post-WW II ===
On March 22, 1946, five members of the Palmach assassinated the mayor of Sarona, Gotthilf Wagner, on the orders of Yitzhak Sadeh. Wagner was ambushed and shot while driving with a police escort from the Wilhelma Detention Camp near the Lydda airport. As his car entered the outlying streets of Tel Aviv, it slowed down on account of heavy traffic. Two men darted out from each side and approached the car. One of them fired a shot which mortally wounded Wagner who then collapsed over the steering wheel of the car. Four men were seen running away through the crowd. He was heading for Sarona to pay the wages of Arab laborers and even though he had £800 with him, none of the money was taken. Jewish Palestinians objected to the reintegration of German Christian residents on the grounds that they actively sympathised with Nazi policies between 1933 and 1939 and openly voiced anti-Jewish sentiments.

In November 1947, the British high commissioner declared Templer land in Palestine "enemy property." A few months later, the Tel Aviv municipality purchased 4,236 dunams of land in Sarona from the British custodian. Three weeks before Israel's declaration of independence, the British evacuated the remaining Templers to Germany and Australia.

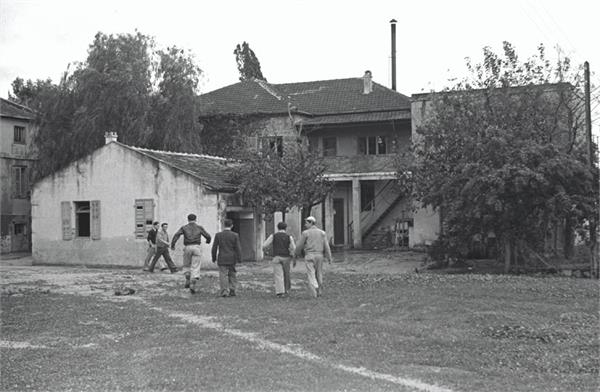
One of the buildings of German Sarona transferred to the Jewish National Fund, December 1947

== State of Israel ==
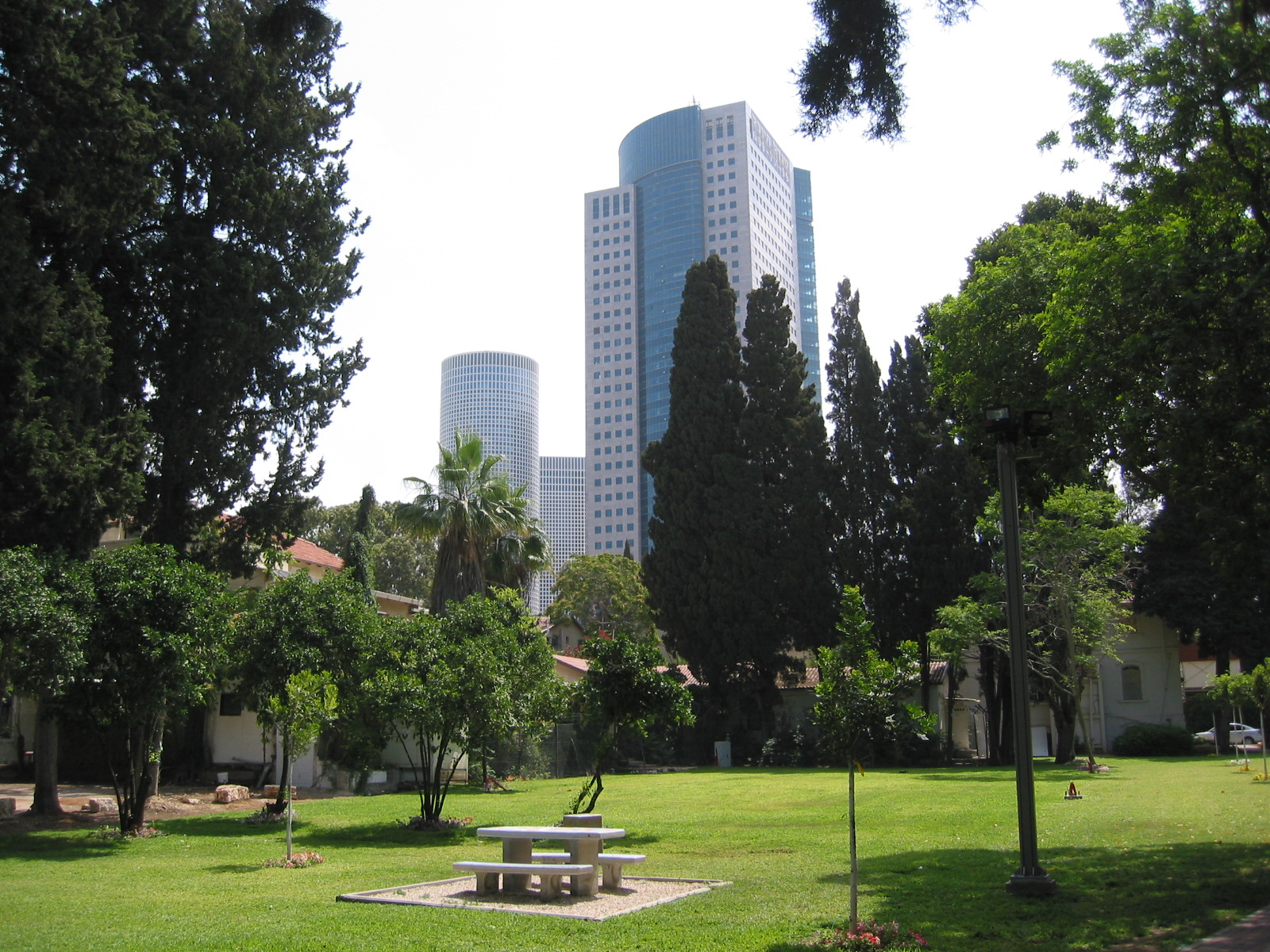
Sarona, 2007

In 1948, when the British Mandate ended and British troops left Sarona, the old houses and army barracks were used by the newly formed Israeli government as offices. The area became known as the "Kirya." A part became a military compound, comprising the Israeli Ministry of Defense, the General Staff of the Israeli Defense Forces, and various other military installations. Other parts of former Sarona were used to house other ministries of the Israeli government including the Intelligence Services.

In 1962 the State of Israel paid 54 million Deutsche Marks in compensation to property owners whose assets were nationalized.

With the rapid growth of Tel Aviv, the Kirya became prime real-estate in the heart of the city. When plans for redeveloping the area were proposed in the mid-1970s, preservationists successfully campaigned against demolition. Consulting with historians, it was decided that Sarona was of heritage value and that 18 structures with distinct architectural styles would be preserved. Civil government departments were moved out of the Sarona's low buildings and into a single high office building erected at its eastern end.

During the widening of Kaplan Street, Sarona's main thoroughfare, considerable effort was made to move the historic buildings intact. These became an area of cafés, shops and recreation. A high-rise headquarters building was also erected in the military section, though historic buildings in the compound remain in IDF use.

The Hidden Treasure

In 2002 an Israeli historian, Nir Man, working on his PhD thesis met some Templers who raised the issue of hidden treasures in their old homes (Hugo's treasure). After getting the necessary written agreements from the owners and the Israeli MoD, Dr. Goldman drilled in 2003 in Hugo's home and found the cache. MoD allowed the return of the treasure to their owners.

== Restoration ==
Moving a landmark building in Sarona during its restoration project in 2005

Ganei Sarona project logo

In 2003, the Tel Aviv municipality began work on a historic conservation project in the Sarona compound. To make way for a highway, techniques were developed for moving some of the houses to a more convenient location.

The houses earmarked for preservation were: the original Community House (No. 25); Old Lämmle House (No. 19); Glenk House (No. 61); The New Community House (No. 9a); Friedrich Häring House (No. 52); New School and Community Complex (No. 84); Immanuel Steller House (No. 55)

In 2008, after the widening of Kaplan Street, which required moving four houses and the old Gemeindehaus (community house), the area to the south was renamed Ganei Sarona (Sarona Gardens).

=== Community house (Gemeindehaus) ===
One of the most important buildings in Sarona was the community house - Gemeindehaus in German or Beit Hava'ad in Hebrew. The cornerstone of the building was laid in 1871, three years after the Templers arrived from Germany. The building was dedicated in early 1873 and housed the local school. After Sarona became a Nazi stronghold, the swastika flew over the building for seven years. In 1943, Irgun fighters planted a bomb near the building, lightly wounding six residents, one of them Gotthilf Wagner, the mayor of Sarona. When the British left Tel Aviv in 1947, a Haganah brigade camped there. The building was renamed for squad commander Carmi Rabinowitz, who was killed in action. In July 1948, after the founding of the state, it became a post office.

During restoration work in 2005, the iron mechanism of the old carillon clock that adorned the facade was discovered. In 2006, the clock was displayed at the Eretz Israel Museum as part of an exhibit on the Templers. A descendant of the Templers who was visiting Israel recognised the signature of the manufacturer, the Perrot Company of Calw, Germany. After contacts with the firm, a new clock was made to replace the old one, and the original clock, now repaired, is displayed at Sarona's visitors' center.

== Research, books ==
Helmut Glenk, who was born in Sarona, has published several books about Sarona exploring the Templers' contribution to the modernisation of Palestine.

== See also ==
- American-German Colony, the older Templer colony in nearby Jaffa
