= Yusuf Hamdan =

- Born: Umm al-Fahm, Mutasarrifate of Jerusalem, Ottoman Empire
- Died: December 1939; Umm al-Fahm, Mandatory Palestine
- Known for: Rebel Commander in the 1936–39 Palestine revolt

Yusuf Hamdan (died December 1939) was a Palestinian rebel commander during the 1936–1939 Arab revolt in British Mandatory Palestine. He was born in the village of Umm al-Fahm and was of Turkmen descent.

== Military career ==
Hamdan was among the highest ranking commanders in the revolt who had been previously involved in the anti-British armed movement of Izz ad-Din al-Qassam. During the revolt, he served as the second-in-command of Yusuf Abu Durra, and was in charge of one of the more organized and disciplined rebel bands active in the revolt, although the number of men in his group was relatively small. In the opinion of the British Deputy Commissioner for the Jenin Subdistrict at the time, Hamdan was the most "intelligent" rebel commander of the revolt.

In late December 1939, the British Army received word via the Royal Dragoons and the police in Hadera that Hamdan and some 15 of his men were camped in Umm al-Fahm. Acting on this information, they ambushed Hamdan. According to a British record of the clashes, a "fierce" firefight ensued, in which Hamdan was shot and killed at point-blank range by British Corporal Whiley, a member of the Royal Dragoons. A number of British officers were wounded in the battle. Hamdan was buried in the Muslim cemetery of al-Lajjun, a village which was later depopulated and destroyed by Israeli forces during the 1948 Arab-Israeli War. His tombstone still remained as of 1987.

== Bibliography ==
- Graham, Frederick Clarence Campbell (1948), History of the Argyll & Sutherland Highlanders, 1st Battalion (Princess Louise's) 1939–1945, T. Nelson & Sons
- Patai, Raphael (1970), Israel between East and West: a study in human relations, Greenwood Pub. Corp, ISBN 9780837137193
