= Community ransom =

Palestinian tax imposed by the Jewish National Council

The community ransom (Hebrew: Kofer HaYishuv; כופר הישוב), or Yishuv ransom was a tax imposed by the Jewish National Council in Mandatory Palestine to finance central security operations and increase the size of the self-defence force known as the Haganah. The principle of the tax was that those who could not make a physical contribution to the Haganah would pay a "ransom" to its treasury. The money was collected through a tax on luxuries, cigarettes, restaurant bills and so on.

The tax was formally introduced on 24 June 1938, during the 1936–39 Arab revolt in Palestine, and abolished on the foundation of the state of Israel in May 1948.
