= Mobile units (Haganah unit) =

The Mobile units "Nomads" or "Wanderers" (Hebrew: הנודדות, romanized: Ha-Nodedot) was a detachment of the Haganah Jewish self-defense force in Mandate Palestine set up during the 1936–1939 Arab revolt in Palestine as a mobile field-intelligence corps. The purpose of the Nodedot was to locate and defeat organised Arab resistance groups before they achieved operational capability.

The detachment was formed on the inspiration of Yitzhak Sadeh, a former officer in the Russian Army and a senior leader in the Haganah, as small night patrols capable of ambushing Arab rebels operating in the area of Jewish settlements.

As the Arab Revolt intensified Sadeh used the tactics he had developed with the Nodedot to establish a permanently mobilized force with regional commands called the Fosh and a joint unit with the British Army called the Special Night Squads.
