= Ahmad Muhammad Hasan =

Ahmad Muhammad Hasan (nom de guerre, Abu Bakr) (died May 1939) was a Palestinian Arab rebel commander during the 1936-1939 Arab revolt in Palestine. He was from the village of Burqa near Nablus. In May 1939, he wrote to the Central Committee of National Jihad in Palestine of rebel excesses towards Palestinian peasants and their traditional leaders, claiming that such actions were diminishing support for the revolt and allowing for the proliferation of collaborators with the British Mandatory authorities. Later that month, Hasan became the last rebel commander to be killed by British forces and his death marked the end of the revolt.

== Bibliography ==
- Thomas, Martin (2008). Empires of intelligence: security services and colonial disorder after 1914. University of California Press. p. 250. ISBN 978-0-520-25117-5.
- Morris, Benny, Righteous Victims : A History of the Zionist-Arab Conflict 1881-1999, Knopf, 2000.
