= Issa Battat =

Palestinian Arab commander of rebels

Issa al-Hajj Suleiman Battat (also spelled 'Isa al-Battat) was a Palestinian Arab commander of rebels during the 1936–39 Arab revolt in Palestine based in the hills around Hebron. Battat was from the town of ad-Dhahiriya in the Hebron Subdistrict of the British Mandate of Palestine. He was a well-known commander in his home region and was suspected by the British authorities of involvement in the killing of British archaeologist J. L. Starkey in January 1938.

== Death ==
The authorities put a bounty on Battat for Starkey's death and other alleged crimes, and his whereabouts were made known to them by a Palestinian informant. Battat and his men were ambushed by British forces in the hills around Hebron on 7 May 1938, leading to a heavy, two-hour-long firefight. Battat was consequently killed in the shootout and his men dispersed, with no British fatalities. Rebels retaliated by executing a Palestinian from Beit Ummar charged with tracking Battat on behalf of the authorities. Abd al-Rahman al-'Azzi, a village leader from Beit Jibrin, was suspected by the al-Husayni faction of informing the authorities about Battat's location and was consequently compelled to organize armed rebel activity in his region to compensate for his alleged collaboration. Al-'Azzi was later killed in 1948 by Battat's sons.

== Bibliography ==
- Cohen, Hillel (2008). Army of Shadows: Palestinian Collaboration with Zionism, 1917-1948. University of California Press. ISBN 9780520252219.
- Cohen, Hillel (2009). Good Arabs: The Israeli Security Agencies and the Israeli Arabs, 1948–1967. University of California Press. ISBN 9780520944886.
