= Peulot Meyuhadot =

Secret special operations squads in Palestine, 1939

Peulot Meyuhadot (POM or Pu"m)
- פעולות מיוחדות
- Active: 1939
- Disbanded: 1939
- Country: British Mandate of Palestine
- Branch: Special operations
- Type: Secret squads
- Role: Special operations, retaliatory strikes, sabotage, elimination of informers
- Size: 3 squads
- Part of: Controlled directly by David Ben-Gurion
- Engagements: 1936–1939 Arab revolt in Palestine

Commanders
- Notable commanders: Yitzhak Sadeh

The Peulot Meyuhadot (POM or Pu''m) (Hebrew: פעולות מיוחדות) were three highly secret special operations squads set up in Palestine by Yitzhak Sadeh on David Ben-Gurion's orders early in 1939, towards the end of the 1936–1939 Arab revolt in Palestine. The squads were created for retaliatory strikes against Arab resistants and villages, attacks on British installations, and the elimination of Jewish informers and traitors.

The squads were controlled directly by Ben Gurion, without reference to the Haganah general command, and were used repeatedly during the last months of the Arab revolt and during the months that followed.

Notable members of the squads were Yigal Allon and David Shaltiel.
