= Ran (Haganah unit) =

Former counter intelligence unit

Ran was the counter-intelligence service of the Jewish Yishuv in Mandate Palestine. It was established by Shaul Avigur (Meirov) and Yehuda Arazi (Tannenbaum), the latter a member of the Palestine Police Force. Arazi joined the police on orders from the Haganah, and rose to become a police inspector in the Criminal Investigation Department (CID).

Ran's primary aim was to thwart the intelligence-gathering operations of the British, Germans, Italians and Americans.
