= Rekhesh =

Jewish armed force branch

Rekhesh (Hebrew: רֶכֶשׁ, lit. Acquisitions) was the arms and munitions procurement branch of the Haganah Jewish defense force in Mandatory Palestine, in the middle 1940s, at a time when the British were not allowing the Jews to have arms.

Rekhesh stole arms from British and Allied military bases, bought weapons on the black market and imported them from legitimate suppliers.

The organization was expert at modifying, dismantling, and packing weapons so that they could be smuggled into Palestine without detection by the British authorities.

Shaul Avigur was head of the organization and Ehud Avriel one of its main operatives.
