= Rasheen Mountain =

Mountain in Tulkarm, Palestine

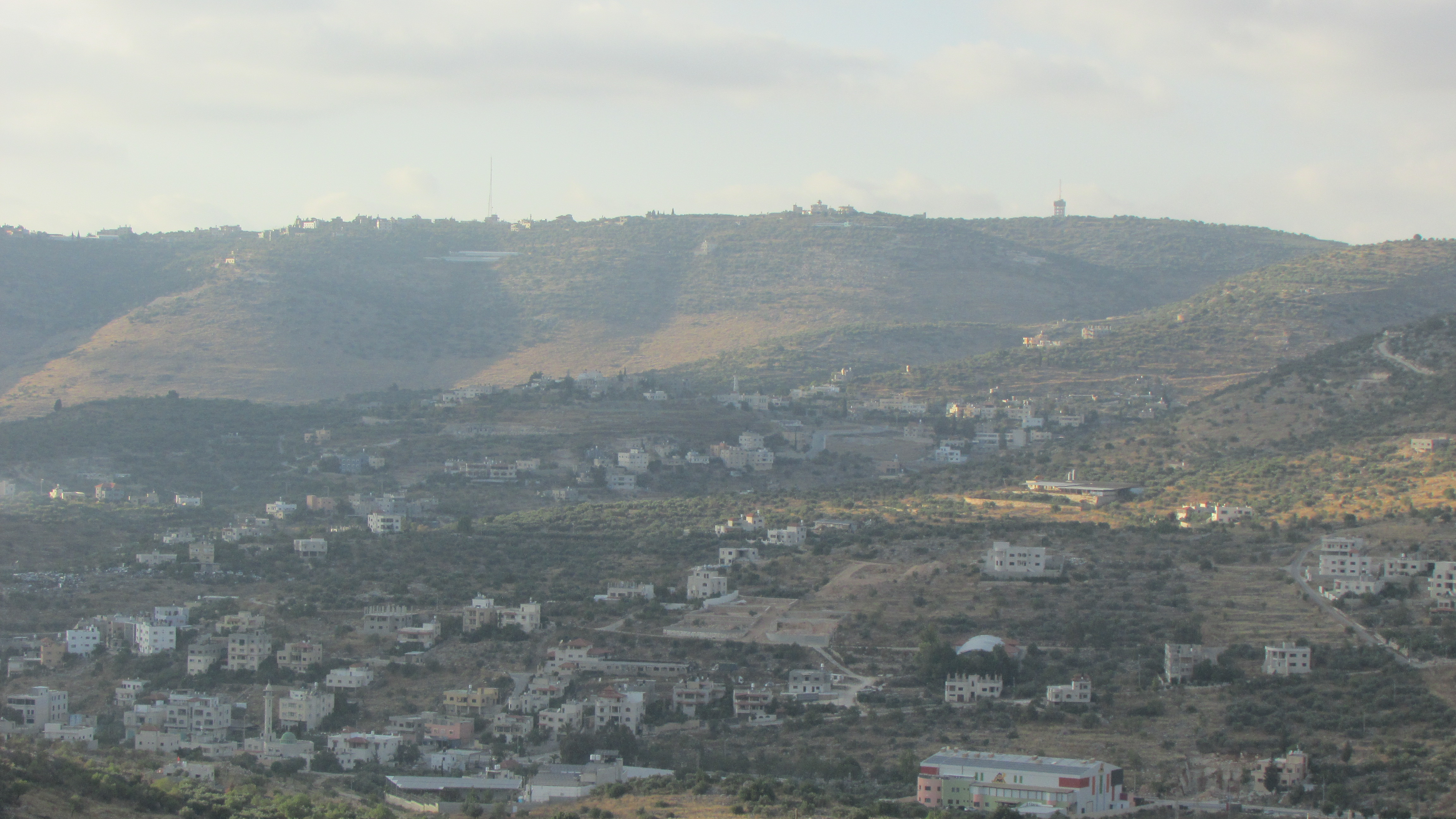
- The peaks of Mount Rasheen

Highest point
- Elevation: 600 m (2,000 ft)
- Coordinates: 32°20′31.62″N 35°7′50.08″E

Geography
- Location: Tulkarm Governorate, Palestine
- Parent range: North Mountain Range

Rasheen Mountain is a historical mountain in the State of Palestine and is the highest area in Tulkarm Governorate above sea level. It rises about 600 meters above sea level, and the mountain experiences snowfall and accumulation of snow in the winter, It is located along the Mediterranean coastline. The mountain is located in the town of Balaa in the governorate and is surrounded by land from the villages of Kafr Rumman, Anabta, and others. At the top of the mountain is the Roman archaeological site of "Khirbet Rasheen". At the base of the mountain, the Ottoman Empire dug the famous Ottoman train tunnel, known as the "Balaa Tunnel". The first of its kind at the time in the Middle East. Today, it is one of the most prominent tourist attractions in Palestine.

== History ==
Rasheen Mountain is part of the northern Palestinian mountain range, and during the Roman Empire, the mountain included the historic Roman archaeological site of Khirbet Rasheen. It is a historical ruin full of ancient monuments such as wells and some buildings. During the Ottoman Empire, the Ottoman train tunnel (Kherq Balaa) was dug about 800 meters into the mountain's interior from start to finish as part of the Hejaz railway line Construction of the tunnel began in the late 1800s during the reign of Sultan Abdul Hamid II, then stopped for lack of funds, and in 1908 work resumed, the construction lasted four years. To commemorate the completion of the project at the time, a large celebration was held in Damascus' Marjeh Square, and a monument was erected in the square to that effect.

== Events ==
- On March 29, 2005, Israeli helicopters landed soldiers on the mountain to sweep the area.

== Palestine's largest tourism project ==
At the end of 2019, some businessmen announced their plans to establish the largest recreational and therapeutic tourism project in Palestine in the mountain area, which will include a medical resort, hotels, and medical and educational tourism treatment centers.

== Photos gallery ==
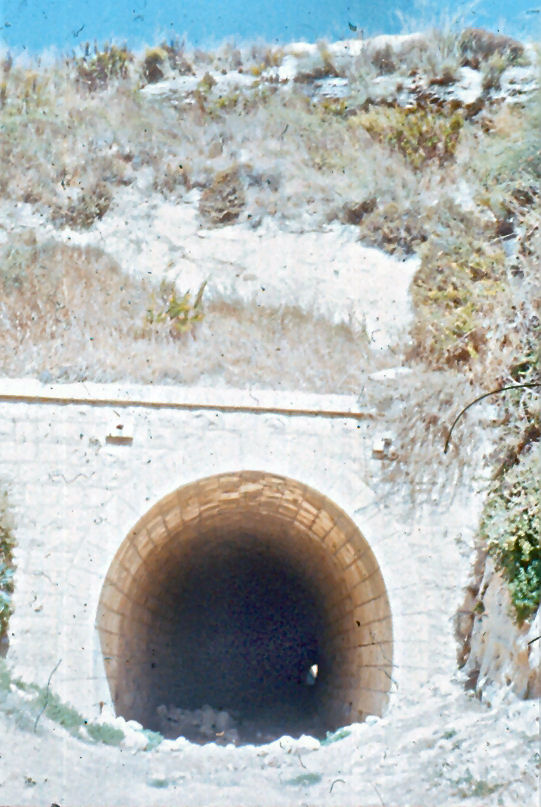
The tunnel under the mountain in 1984

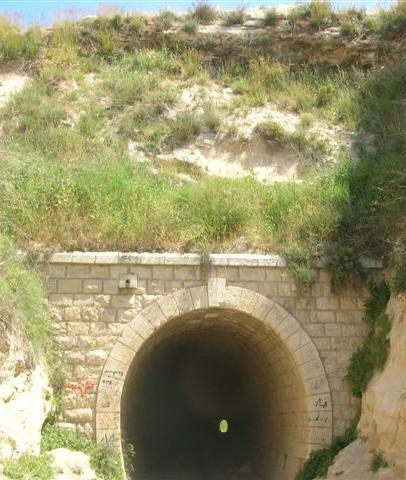
Tunnel from the outside

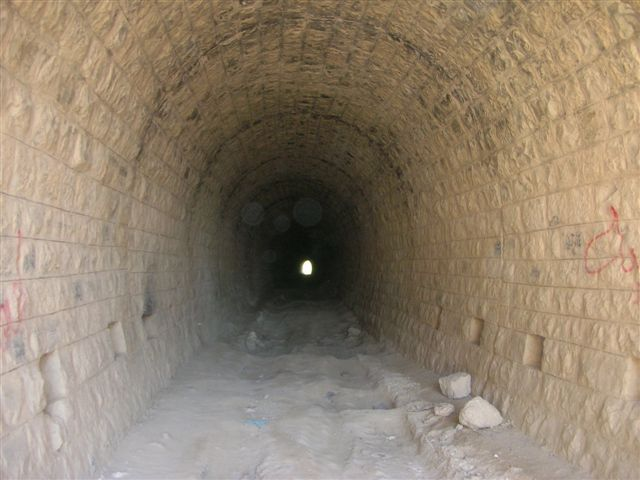
Inside the tunnel

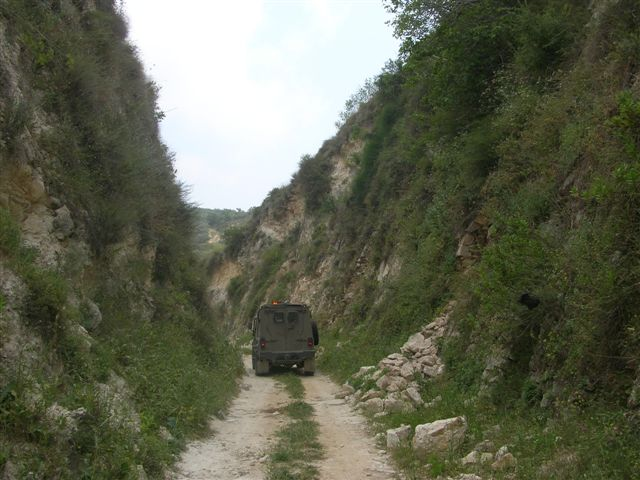
Tunnel exit
