= Abd al-Sattar Qasim =

Palestinian politician (1948–2021)

- Born: 21 September 1948; Deir al-Ghusun, Tulkarm Governorate, West Bank
- Died: 1 February 2021 (aged 72); Nablus, West Bank
- Education: The American University in Cairo; Kansas State University; University of Missouri

Abd al-Sattar Tawfiq Qasim al-Khader (Arabic: عبد الستار توفيق قاسم الخضر خليلية; 21 September 1948 – 1 February 2021) was a Palestinian writer, thinker, political analyst, and academic. He was born in the town of Deir al-Ghusun in Tulkarm Governorate and died in Nablus. Qasim was a professor of political science and Palestinian studies at An-Najah National University in Nablus. He is known for his positions rejecting the settlement with Israel and critical of the Palestinian Self-Government Authority.

== Life ==
He received a bachelor's degree in political science from The American University in Cairo, then a master's degree in political science from the American Kansas State University, then a master's degree in economics from the University of Missouri, USA, then a doctorate in political philosophy from the University of Missouri also in 1977.

Qasim worked at the University of Jordan with the rank of assistant professor in 1978, and his services were terminated after a year and a half in 1979. He worked as a professor of political science at An-Najah National University in Nablus since 1980, and he worked as a part-time professor at each university, Birzeit University and Al-Quds University. He retired from teaching from An-Najah National University in 2013.

== Awards ==
In 1984, he won the Abdul Hameed Shoman Prize in the field of political science.

== Writings ==
=== Books and research ===
He has published 25 books, and has written about 130 scientific papers and thousands of articles. Of which:

1. Traditional political philosophy
2. Fall of the King of Kings (On the Iranian Revolution)
3. The martyr Ezz El-Din Al-Qassam
4. The Golan Heights
5. The detention experiment
6. Days in the Naqab detention camp
7. Individual and group freedom in Islam
8. Women in Islamic Thought
9. Prophet Abraham and the covenant with the children of Israel
10. The road to defeat
11. The summary on the Palestinian issue.
12. The graves of Arab intellectuals

He has written research papers on various topics in politics, such as the Americanization of the Arabs, the Palestinian resistance, Islamic political thought and globalization.

== Death ==
He died on 1 February 2021, at An-Najah National University Hospital in Nablus, after being infected with COVID-19 during the COVID-19 pandemic in the State of Palestine.
