= Kur, Tulkarm =

Kur
- Municipality type D (Village council)

Arabic transcription(s)
  - Arabic: كور
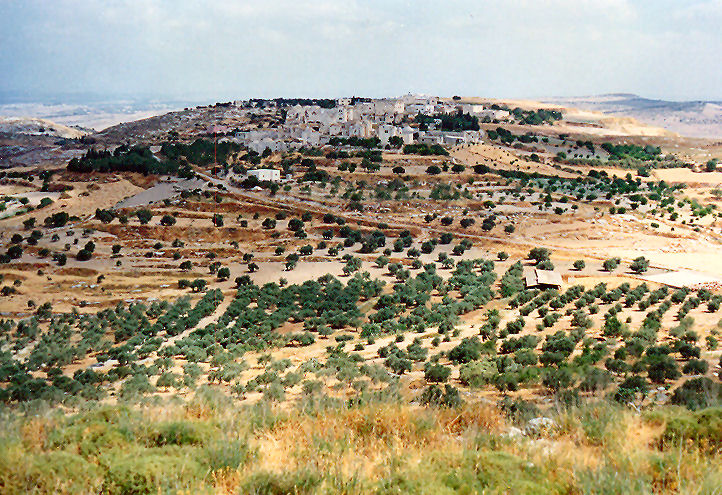
- Kur, 1990

- Location of Kur within Palestine
- Coordinates: 32°14′07″N 35°05′52″E
- Palestine grid: 159/182
- State: State of Palestine
- Governorate: Tulkarm

Government
  - Type: Village council

Population (2017)
  - Total: 292
- Name meaning: digging. Perhaps from Kuwar, a town

Kur (Arabic: كور) is a Palestinian village in the Tulkarm Governorate of the State of Palestine, in the northeastern West Bank, located 19 kilometers southeast of Tulkarm.

== Population ==
According to the Palestinian Central Bureau of Statistics, Kur had a population of approximately 325 inhabitants in mid-year 2006 and 292 by 2017. 7.9% of the population of Kur were refugees in 1997.

== Healthcare ==
The healthcare facilities for Kur are based in Kafr 'Abbush, where the facilities are designated as MOH level 2.

== History ==
Ceramics from the Byzantine era have been found here.

=== Ottoman era ===
Kur was incorporated into the Ottoman Empire in 1517 with all of Palestine, and in 1596 it appeared in the tax registers as being in the Nahiya of Bani Sa'b of the Liwa of Nablus. It had a population of 32 households and 6 bachelors, all Muslim. The villagers paid a fixed tax-rate of 33,3% on agricultural products, including wheat, barley, summer crops, olive trees, occasional revenues, goats and/or beehives, a press for olive oil or grape syrup, and a customary tax on subjects in Nablus region; a total of 13,166 akçe.

In 1838, Robinson noted Kur as a village in the Beni Sa'ab district, west of Nablus.

In 1870/1871 (1288 AH), an Ottoman census listed the village in the nahiya (sub-district) of Bani Sa'b.

In 1882, the PEF's Survey of Western Palestine described it as: "A stone village in a strong position on a ridge, with a steep slope to the east. It is of moderate size, well-built of stone, and supplied by cisterns. Traces of an ancient road exist near it. It is the Kursi, or seat of a famous native family (Beit Jiyusi). It is, perhaps, worthy of notice that the name resembles the Corea of Josephus, near which was a fortress called Alexandrium. About a mile north of Kur is Khurbet Iskander (Ruin of Alexander); the position, however, does not seem to agree with the account of Josephus." They further noted: "A ruined watchtower, like the one described at 'Azzun, exists north-east of this place."

=== British Mandate era ===
In the 1922 census of Palestine conducted by the British Mandate authorities, Kur had a population of 301, all Muslims, decreasing by the 1931 census when Kur had a population of 280 Muslims, in 58 houses.

In the 1945 statistics Kur had a population of 280 Muslims and a land area of 8,514 dunams, according to an official land and population survey. Of this, 253 dunams were plantations and irrigable land, 1,677 used for cereals, while 17 dunams were built-up (urban) land.

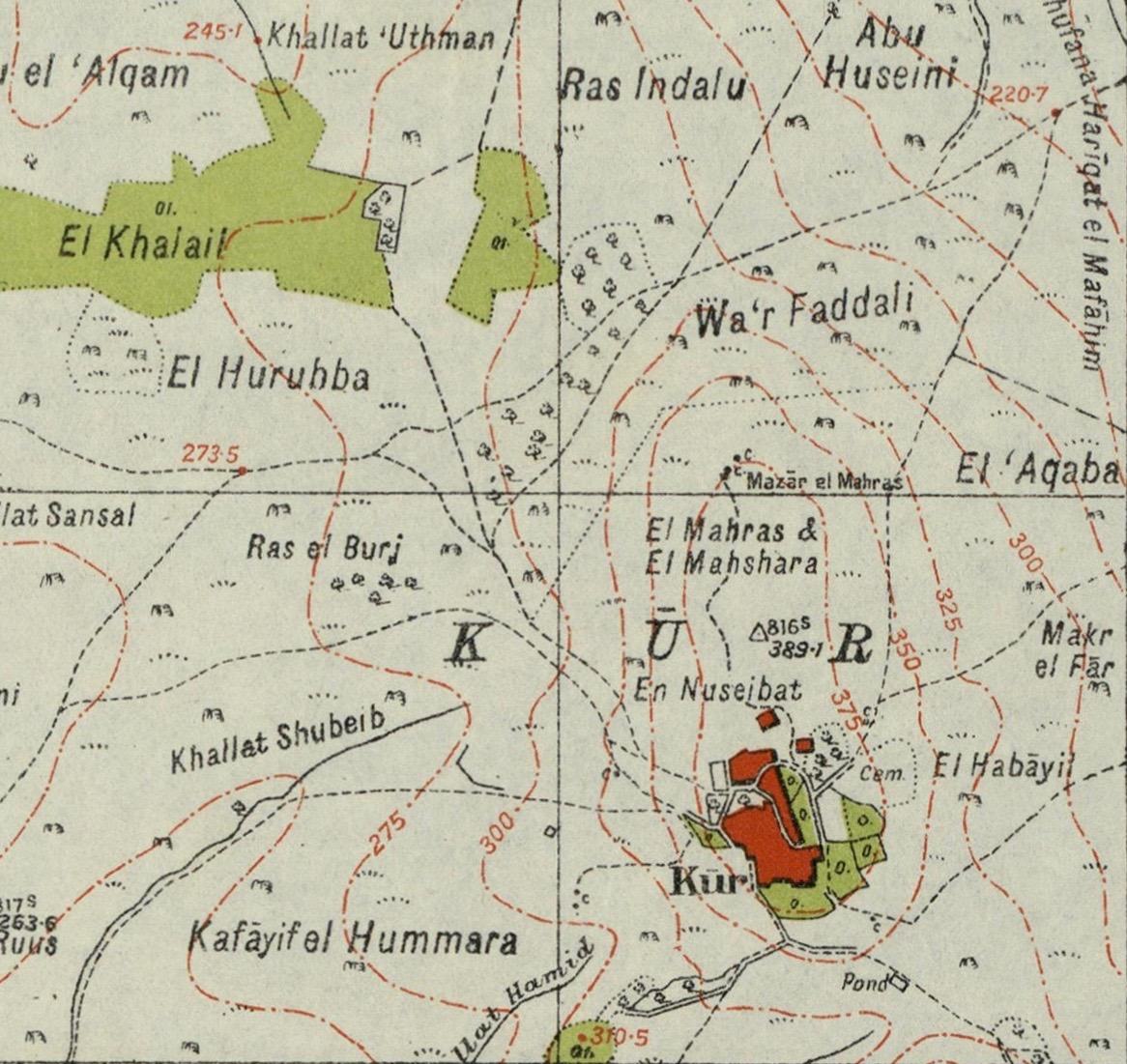
Kur 1942 1:20,000

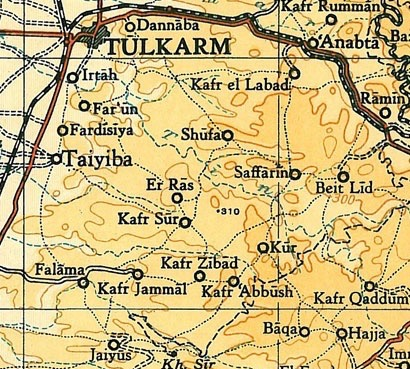
Kur 1945 1:250,000

=== Jordanian era ===
After the 1948 Arab–Israeli War and the 1949 Armistice Agreements, Kur came under Jordanian rule.

The Jordanian census of 1961 found 336 inhabitants in Kur.

=== Post-1967 ===
Since the Six-Day War in 1967, Kur has been under Israeli occupation.

== Bibliography ==
- Barron, J.B., ed. (1923). Palestine: Report and General Abstracts of the Census of 1922. Government of Palestine.
- Conder, C.R.; Kitchener, H.H. (1882). The Survey of Western Palestine: Memoirs of the Topography, Orography, Hydrography, and Archaeology. Vol. 2. London: Committee of the Palestine Exploration Fund.
- Dauphin, C. (1998). La Palestine byzantine, Peuplement et Populations. BAR International Series 726 (in French). Vol. III : Catalogue. Oxford: Archeopress. ISBN 0-860549-05-4.
- Government of Jordan, Department of Statistics (1964). First Census of Population and Housing. Volume I: Final Tables; General Characteristics of the Population (PDF).
- Government of Palestine, Department of Statistics (1945). Village Statistics, April, 1945.
- Hadawi, S. (1970). Village Statistics of 1945: A Classification of Land and Area ownership in Palestine. Palestine Liberation Organization Research Center.
- Hütteroth, W.-D.; Abdulfattah, K. (1977). Historical Geography of Palestine, Transjordan and Southern Syria in the Late 16th Century. Erlanger Geographische Arbeiten, Sonderband 5. Erlangen, Germany: Vorstand der Fränkischen Geographischen Gesellschaft. ISBN 3-920405-41-2.
- Mills, E., ed. (1932). Census of Palestine 1931. Population of Villages, Towns and Administrative Areas. Jerusalem: Government of Palestine.
- Palmer, E.H. (1881). The Survey of Western Palestine: Arabic and English Name Lists Collected During the Survey by Lieutenants Conder and Kitchener, R. E. Transliterated and Explained by E.H. Palmer. Committee of the Palestine Exploration Fund.
- Robinson, E.; Smith, E. (1841). Biblical Researches in Palestine, Mount Sinai and Arabia Petraea: A Journal of Travels in the year 1838. Vol. 3. Boston: Crocker & Brewster.
