= Anabta =

- Municipality type C

Arabic transcription(s)
  - Arabic: عنبتا
  - Latin: 'Anabta (official) 'Anabta and Iktaba (unofficial)
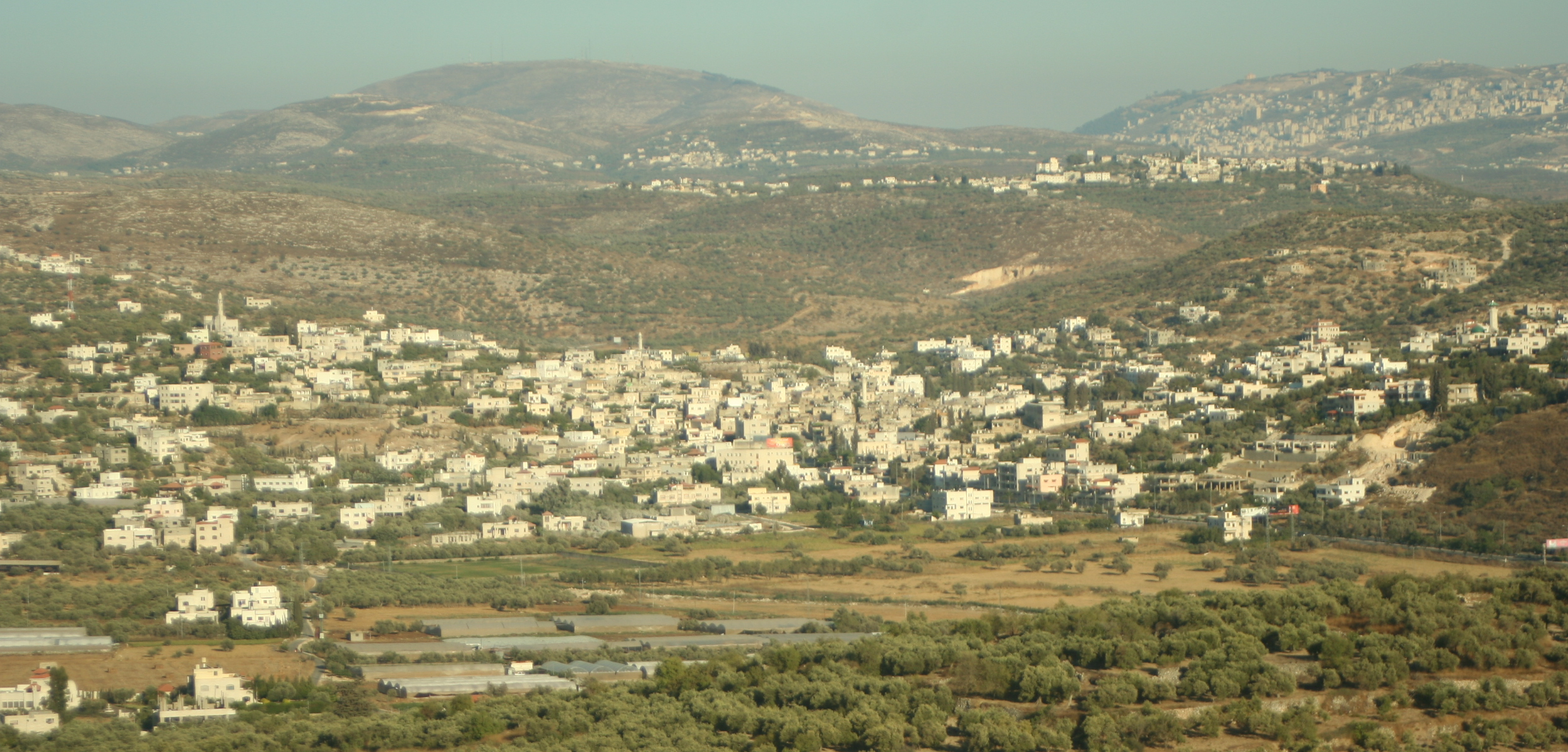
- View of Anabta

- Location of Anabta within Palestine Anabta (the West Bank)
- Coordinates: 32°18′26″N 35°07′01″E
- Palestine grid: 161/190
- State: State of Palestine
- Governorate: Tulkarm

Government
  - Type: Municipality
  - Head of Municipality: Hamdallah. H. Hamdallah

Population (2017)
  - Total: 8,077
- Name meaning: grapes

'Anabta or 'Anebta (Arabic: عنبتا) is a Palestinian town in the Tulkarm Governorate in the northern West Bank, located 9 kilometers east of Tulkarm. According to the Palestinian Central Bureau of Statistics, Anabta had a population of 8,077 inhabitants in 2017. Anabta is administered by a municipal council and is one of the oldest municipalities in the Tulkarm Governorate.

== Etymology ==
The name is derived from the word Enabta, which meant "grape" or "berry" in Aramaic and Syriac. The long vowel -ā ending, typically reflecting the Aramaic absolute state, a morphological feature widely attested in Palestinian toponyms. Many grape presses have been found in the hills around the village.

== History ==
=== Roman and Byzantine era ===
Sherds from the Hellenistic, early and late Roman and the Byzantine eras have been found here.

During Roman and Byzantine rule, Anabta was a Samaritan village. A tradition connects the village with Dositheos, a Samaritan religious leader possibly active during the 1st century CE. The Samaritan chronicler Abu l-Fath (14th century) mentions that Dositheos died of starvation after going to 'Anbata where he hid in a cave, fasting in an effort to gain wisdom. Some olive trees still existing in Anabta are said to date back to Roman times.

According to the PEF's Survey of Western Palestine, the site appeared "ancient", and rock-cut tombs and a tank of good masonry had been found.

Pottery sherds from the early Muslim and Medieval eras have also been found here.

=== Mamluk and Ottoman eras ===
During the reign of Mamluk Sultan Baibars al-Bunduqdari in the 13th century, Anabta served as a central staging point from which to supply the Muslim armies fighting Crusader and Mongol incursions. The location was chosen because it was considered relatively easy to protect as the area is nestled between two large hills.

During Ottoman rule, Anabta was listed in the 1596 Ottoman tax register as being in the Nahiya of Jabal Sami of the Liwa of Nablus. It had a population of 55 Muslim households who paid a fixed tax rate of 33,3% on wheat, barley, summer crops, olives, goats or beehives, and presses for grapes or olives; a total of 13,757 akçe.

In 1852, the American scholar Edward Robinson visited the village. He described it as "large and well built", with two watermills by the stream. There were many camels there, as the village was on the main route for camels from Nablus to Ramleh.

In 1870/1871 (1288 AH), an Ottoman census listed the village in the nahiya (sub-district) of Wadi al-Sha'ir.

In 1882, the PEF's Survey of Western Palestine described it as a village of moderate size, in the valley, with olives around it. It also had a mill. A portion of the Hejaz Railway used to run through the centre of the town, parallel to the main street.

=== British Mandate era ===
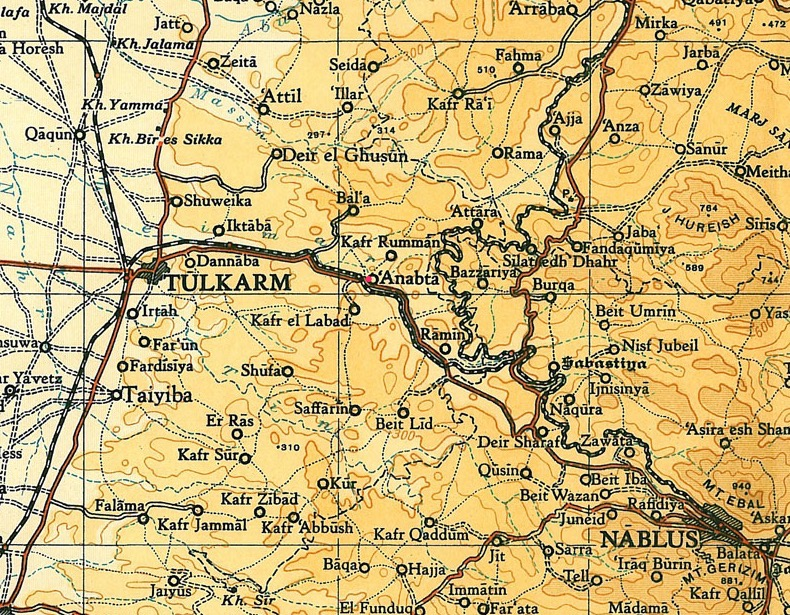
Anabta. 1945. Survey of Palestine. Scale 1:250,000.

The first local council in Anabta was established in 1922 during the mandate period. In the 1936 Anabta shooting, on the night of April 15, 1936, a prelude to the 1936–39 Arab revolt in Palestine, about 20 vehicles traveling on the road outside Anabta were stopped at a road block constructed for the purpose by armed villagers, and forced to hand over weapons and cash. 3 Jewish drivers were separated from the non-Jewish drivers and shot, 2 died of their injuries, the third survived.

In June, an attack by Arab irregulars on a civilian bus convoy escalated into the Battle of Anabta, a brief but intense fight between Arab militants and the British army involving air attacks on the Arab fighters. On October 12, 1936, when the rebellion stopped, the Daily Telegraph reporter described the village during his visit to it, he said: "Anabta, the scene of several encounters between British troops and Arabs, was the only place through which I passed where the inhabitants showed truculence".

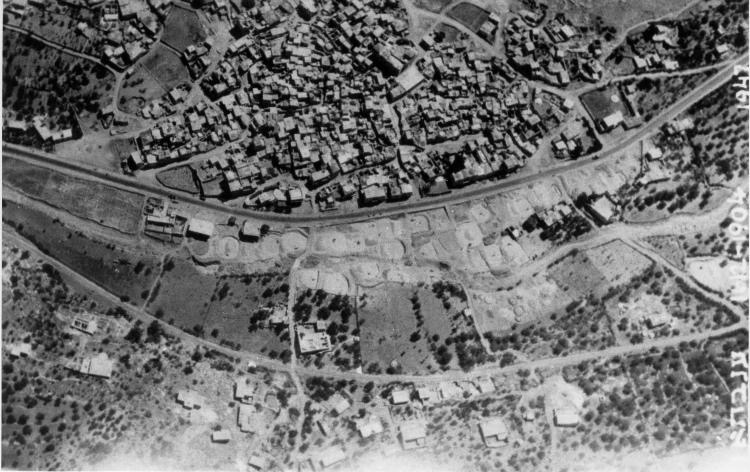
Anabta 1947

=== Jordanian era ===
In the wake of the 1948 Arab–Israeli War, and after the 1949 Armistice Agreements, Anabta came under Jordanian rule.

In 1954, Anabta became a municipal council.

In 1961, the population of Anabta was 4,018.

=== Post-1967 ===
Since the Six-Day War in 1967, Anabta has been under Israeli occupation. Shortly after the war, Anabta underwent major development and achieved local council status. According to Israel's Ministry of Defense, the village was connected to the Israeli electric grid. Anabta lies on the edge of the Tulkarm district's Area A, a Palestinian enclave, which means the city became under full security and civil jurisdiction of the Palestinian National Authority.

== Geography ==
Anabta is located 19 kilometers west of Nablus and 9 kilometers east of Tulkarm. The town is bordered to the north by the village of Kafr Rumman, the south by the town of Kafr al-Labad, the east by the village of Ramin and the northwest by the town of Bal'a. The city is elevated 150 meters above sea level. Surrounded by hills on all sides, a small valley that runs through the center of the town. The town has an urban area of about 1,300 dunams. Most of its exterior lands are planted with olives, figs and almonds or covered by forests. Water is provided by five underground wells, with distribution supervised by the town's municipality. The Israeli settlement Einav is located southeast of the city and an Israeli checkpoint is positioned at the eastern entrance of the town.

== Demographics ==
By an 1870 visitor, the population was estimated at 1,800. At the time of the 1922 census of Palestine, Anabta had a population of 1,606 Muslims. In the 1931 census of Palestine, the combined population of Anabta, Iktaba and Nur ash Shams was 2498; 2,457 Muslims, 34 Christians and 1 Druze living in 502 houses. The Christian population was of relatively recent origins, apparently coming from Christian villages around Nablus to trade and work as craftsmen.

In 1945, the combined population of Anabta and Iktaba was 3,120. Between 1922 and 1947, the population increased by 110%.

In 1967, the population was 3,400, rising to 5,700 by 1987 and 8,300 by 2009.

=== Clans ===
Residents of Anabta belong to two large clans, 'Amr and Al-Jetawi. These families are then divided into smaller families. Residents of the village have origins in Hebron, Kafr ad-Dik and other locations. Anabta also contains a significant population of Palestinians from Gaza who are not classified among the families.

== Education ==
The town has two high schools and four elementary schools that are maintained and funded by the Palestinian Authority Ministry of Education.

== Health care ==
The St John of Jerusalem Eye Hospital Group operates a clinic in Anabta envisaged as a centre for the treatment of diabetic retinopathy in the northern West Bank.

== Notable residents, or people from Anabta ==
- Rami Hamdallah, Palestinian prime minister and president of An-Najah National University
- Ibrahim Nassar, Palestinian political and Commander in 1936–39 Arab revolt in Palestine
- Samiha Khalil, former Palestinian presidential candidate
- Anwar Hamed, novelist, poet and author
- Marwan Awartani, Minister of Education and Higher Education

== Bibliography ==
- Barron, J.B., ed. (1923). Palestine: Report and General Abstracts of the Census of 1922. Government of Palestine.
- Conder, C.R.; Kitchener, H.H. (1882). The Survey of Western Palestine: Memoirs of the Topography, Orography, Hydrography, and Archaeology. Vol. 2. London: Committee of the Palestine Exploration Fund.
- Dauphin, C. (1998). La Palestine byzantine, Peuplement et Populations. BAR International Series 726 (in French). Vol. III : Catalogue. Oxford: Archeopress. ISBN 0-860549-05-4.
- Government of Jordan, Department of Statistics (1964). First Census of Population and Housing. Volume I: Final Tables; General Characteristics of the Population (PDF).
- Government of Palestine, Department of Statistics (1945). Village Statistics, April, 1945.
- Guérin, V. (1875). Description Géographique Historique et Archéologique de la Palestine (in French). Vol. 2: Samarie, pt. 2. Paris: L'Imprimerie Nationale.
- Hadawi, S. (1970). Village Statistics of 1945: A Classification of Land and Area ownership in Palestine. Palestine Liberation Organization Research Center. Archived from the original on 2018-12-08.
- Hütteroth, W.-D.; Abdulfattah, K. (1977). Historical Geography of Palestine, Transjordan and Southern Syria in the Late 16th Century. Erlanger Geographische Arbeiten, Sonderband 5. Erlangen, Germany: Vorstand der Fränkischen Geographischen Gesellschaft. ISBN 3-920405-41-2.
- Mills, E., ed. (1932). Census of Palestine 1931. Population of Villages, Towns and Administrative Areas. Jerusalem: Government of Palestine.
- Palmer, E.H. (1881). The Survey of Western Palestine: Arabic and English Name Lists Collected During the Survey by Lieutenants Conder and Kitchener, R. E. Transliterated and Explained by E.H. Palmer. Committee of the Palestine Exploration Fund.
- Robinson, E.; Smith, E. (1856). Later Biblical Researches in Palestine and adjacent regions: A Journal of Travels in the year 1852. London: John Murray.
- Tsafrir, Y.; Leah Di Segni; Judith Green (1994). (TIR): Tabula Imperii Romani: Judaea, Palaestina. Jerusalem: Israel Academy of Sciences and Humanities. ISBN 965-208-107-8.
- Zertal, A. (2004). The Manasseh Hill Country Survey. Vol. 1. Boston: BRILL. ISBN 9004137564.
