= Izzat Ghazzawi =

Palestinian writer (1951–2003)

- عزت الغزاوي
- Born: 4 December 1951; Deir al-Ghusun, Tulkarm Governorate
- Died: 4 April 2003 (aged 51)
- Occupation: Professor at Birzeit University
- Awards: Sakharov Prize (2001)

Izzat Ghazzawi (Arabic: عزت الغزاوي, romanized: ʻIzzat al-Ghazzāwī; 4 December 1951 – 4 April 2003) was a Palestinian writer and peace activist.

Izzat Ghazzawi was born on 4 December 1951 in Deir al-Ghusun, which was under Jordanian rule, in Tulkarm Governorate.

Ghazzawi earned a master's degree in English literature, and became a professor at Birzeit University. He was also a literary critic, and was the founder and inaugural chair of the first International Writers’ Conference in Palestine in 1997.

He wrote about the sufferings of the Palestinian people and was arrested many times by Israeli authorities for "political activities". Together with the Israeli writer Abraham B. Yehoshua and the Italian photographer Oliviero Toscani, Ghazzawi published a book on relations between the Palestinians and the Israelis. He also wrote fiction.

His son Ramy was killed by the Israeli Defense Forces when he was aged 16.

In 1995 Ghazzawi was awarded the International Prize for Freedom of Expression in Stavanger, Norway. He was awarded the Sakharov Prize for freedom of thought in 2001, along with Israeli woman Nurit Peled-Elhanan, for their work in support of the peace process in the Middle East.

Ghazzawi died on 4 April 2003.
