= Marwan Awartani =

Former Palestinian Education Minister

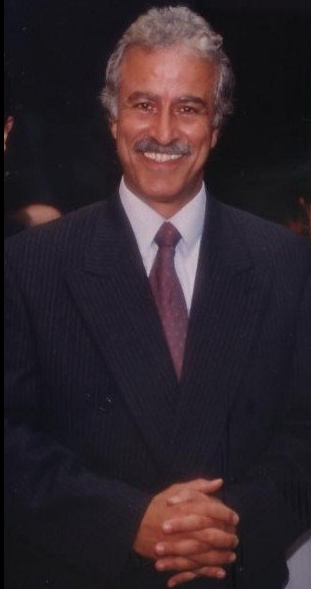
- Awartani at the Takreem Awards in 2008

Minister of Education
- In office 13 April 2019 – 3 September 2023
- Prime Minister: Mohammad Shtayyeh
- Preceded by: Sabri Saidam
- Succeeded by: Mahmoud Abu Muwais

Personal details
- Born: 21 April 1949 (age 77) Anabta, Jordanian-administered West Bank, Palestine (present-day Anabta, Tulkarm Governorate, Palestine)
- Party: Independent
- Education: American University of Beirut (BS); Lehigh University (MS, PhD)
- Occupation: Politician, professor, educator

Marwan Awartani (born 21 April 1949) is a Palestinian politician, professor and educator who formerly served as the Minister of Education of the Palestinian National Authority from 13 April 2019 to 3 September 2023. He is also President of the Palestinian Society for Mathematical Sciences, Alpha International, and Palestine Technical University-Kadoorie.

== Early life and education ==
Marwan Awartani was born 21 April 1949 in Anabta, Tulkarm Governorate. Awartani graduated with a bachelor of science degree in Mathematics from American University of Beirut in 1973. He obtained a master of science degree in Topology from Lehigh University in 1978, where he also completed his Ph.D. in 1980.

== Career ==
Awartani served as the Palestinian Minister of Education from 13 April 2019 until his resignation from the post was accepted on 3 September 2023.

Awartani served as the Acting President of Al-Quds University, Secretary General of the Universal Education Foundation, and is the Chairman of the Arab Foundations Forum.

Political offices
Preceded by Sabri Saidam	Minister of Education; 2019–2023	Succeeded by Mahmoud Abu Muwais
