= An-Nazla al-Wusta =

an-Nazla al-Wusta
- Municipality type D (Village council)

Arabic transcription(s)
  - Arabic: النزله الوسطه
- Location of an-Nazla al-Wusta within Palestine
- Coordinates: 32°24′31″N 35°05′46″E
- Palestine grid: 159/201
- State: State of Palestine
- Governorate: Tulkarm

Government
  - Type: Village council

Population (2017)
  - Total: 437
- Name meaning: The middle settlement

An-Nazla al-Wusta (Arabic: النزلة الوسطى) is a Palestinian village in the Tulkarm Governorate in the West Bank, located 17 kilometers North-east of Tulkarm.

== History ==
=== Ottoman era ===
Pottery remains from the Ottoman era have been found here.

In 1882, the PEF's Survey of Western Palestine described Nuzlet el Wusta as a hamlet smaller than Nuzlet et Tinat, and located "on a spur, with a few trees."

=== British Mandate era ===
In the 1945 statistics the population of Nazla el Wusta was 60 Muslims, with 1,609 dunams of land according to an official land and population survey. Of this, 264 dunams were plantations and irrigable land, 428 were used for cereals, while 2 dunams were built-up (urban) land.

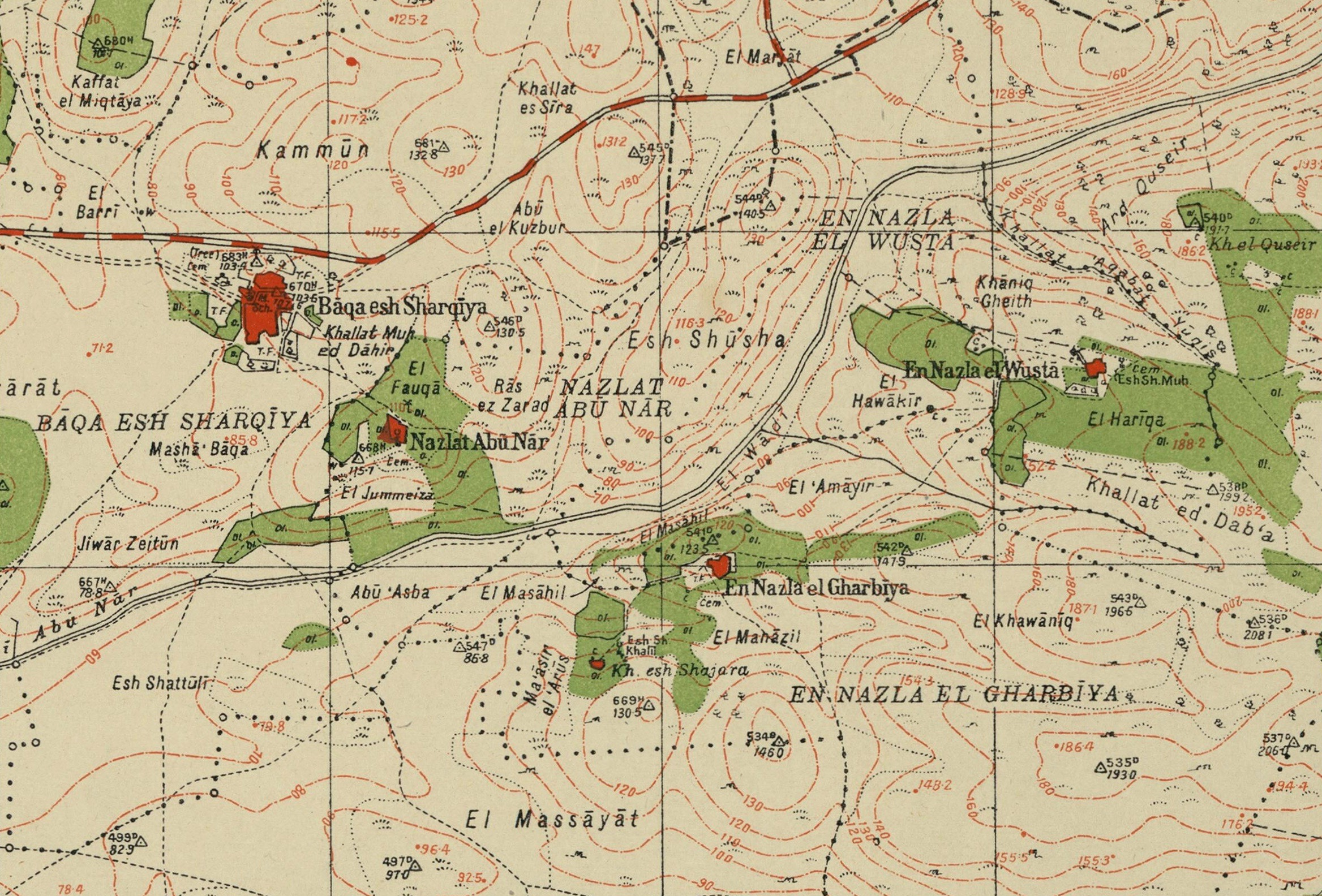
an-Nazla al-Wusta 1942 1:20,000

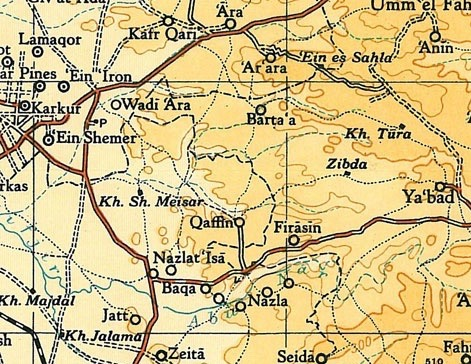
an-Nazla al-Wusta 1945 1:250,000

=== Jordanian era ===
In the wake of the 1948 Arab–Israeli War, and after the 1949 Armistice Agreements, An-Nazla al-Wusta came under Jordanian rule. It was annexed by Jordan in 1950.

In 1961, the population of Nazla Wusta was 128.

=== Post 1967 ===
Since the Six-Day War in 1967, An-Nazla al-Wusta has been under Israeli occupation.

According to the Palestinian Central Bureau of Statistics, an-Nazla al-Wusta had a population of approximately 437 inhabitants in 2017. 38.7% of the population of an-Nazla al-Wusta were refugees in 1997. The healthcare facilities for an-Nazla al-Wusta are based in an-Nazla ash-Sharqiya, where the facilities are designated as MOH level 2.

== Bibliography ==
- Barron, J.B., ed. (1923). Palestine: Report and General Abstracts of the Census of 1922. Government of Palestine.
- Conder, C.R.; Kitchener, H.H. (1882). The Survey of Western Palestine: Memoirs of the Topography, Orography, Hydrography, and Archaeology. Vol. 2. London: Committee of the Palestine Exploration Fund.
- Government of Jordan, Department of Statistics (1964). First Census of Population and Housing. Volume I: Final Tables; General Characteristics of the Population (PDF).
- Government of Palestine, Department of Statistics (1945). Village Statistics, April, 1945.
- Hadawi, S. (1970). Village Statistics of 1945: A Classification of Land and Area ownership in Palestine. Palestine Liberation Organization Research Center. Archived from the original on 2018-12-08.
- Palmer, E.H. (1881). The Survey of Western Palestine: Arabic and English Name Lists Collected During the Survey by Lieutenants Conder and Kitchener, R. E. Transliterated and Explained by E.H. Palmer. Committee of the Palestine Exploration Fund.
- Zertal, A. (2016). The Manasseh Hill Country Survey. Vol. 3. Boston: BRILL. ISBN 978-9004312302.
