= Al-Jarushiya =

al-Jarushiya
- Municipality type D (Village council)

Arabic transcription(s)
  - Arabic: الجاروشية
- Location of al-Jarushiya within Palestine
- Coordinates: 32°20′50″N 35°03′02″E
- Palestine grid: 155/194
- State: State of Palestine
- Governorate: Tulkarm

Government
  - Type: Village council

Population (2017)
  - Total: 1,183

al-Jarushiya (Arabic: الجاروشية) is a Palestinian village in the Tulkarm Governorate in the western West Bank, located 6 kilometers North of Tulkarm. According to the Palestinian Central Bureau of Statistics, al Jarushiya had a population of 1,183 inhabitants in 2017. 8.4% of the population of al-Jarushiya were refugees in 1997. The healthcare facilities for the surrounding villages are based in al-Jarushiya, the facilities are designated as MOH level 2.

== History ==
In 1961, under Jordanian rule, the population of Jarushiya was 245.

=== Post 1967 ===
After the Six-Day War in 1967, Al-Jarushiya came under Israeli occupation.

== Bibliography ==
- Government of Jordan, Department of Statistics (1964). First Census of Population and Housing. Volume I: Final Tables; General Characteristics of the Population (PDF).
