= Izbat Shufa =

- Municipality type D (Village council)

Arabic transcription(s)
  - Arabic: عزبة شوفة
  - Latin: Izbet Shufa (unofficial)
- Location of Izbat Shufa within Palestine
- Coordinates: 32°17′14″N 35°02′33″E
- Palestine grid: 154/188
- State: State of Palestine
- Governorate: Tulkarm

Government
  - Type: Village council

Population (2017)
  - Total: 1,456

Izbat Shufa (Arabic: عزبة شوفة) is a Palestinian town in the Tulkarm Governorate in the eastern West Bank, located Southeast of Tulkarm.
