= Baqa ash-Sharqiyya =

Baqa ash-Sharqiyya باقة الشرقية
- Municipality type C

Arabic transcription(s)
  - Arabic: باقه الشرقية
  - Latin: Baqa al-Sharqiyya (official); Baqa ash-Sharkiya (unofficial)
- Location of Baqa ash-Sharqiyya within Palestine
- Coordinates: 32°24′38″N 35°04′09″E
- Palestine grid: 156/201
- State: State of Palestine
- Governorate: Tulkarm

Government
  - Type: Municipality
  - Head of Municipality: Abdul Rahim Mustafa Janim

Area
  - Total: 4.2 km^{2} (1.6 sq mi)

Population (2017)
  - Total: 4,892
  - Density: 1,200/km^{2} (3,000/sq mi)
- Name meaning: "The eastern bouquet [of flowers]" or "The eastern Baka"

Baqa ash-Sharqiyya (Arabic: باقة الشرقية) is a Palestinian town in the northern West Bank, located 16 kilometers (9.9 mi) northeast of Tulkarm in the Tulkarm Governorate. According to the Palestinian Central Bureau of Statistics (PCBS), the town had a population of 4,892 inhabitants in 2017. Refugees made up 20.4% of the Baqa ash-Sharqiyya's population in 1997.

Approximately 3 kilometers (1.9 mi) to the west, on the other side of the Green Line, lies Baqa al-Gharbiyye, ("the western bouquet of flowers") which is under Israeli jurisdiction. Prior to the Second Intifada, Baqa ash-Sharqiyya consisted of 4,000 dunams; Israel confiscated about 2,000 dunams of land in order to build the Israeli West Bank barrier.

== History ==
Ceramic from the Hellenistic, early and late Roman, Byzantine and the Middle Ages have been found here.

In 1265, Baqa ash-Sharqiyya was among the estates Sultan Baibars handed to his followers, after he had defeated the Crusaders; the whole of Baqa ash-Sharqiyya was given to Emir 'Ala' al-Din Aidakin al-Bunduqdar al-Salihi.

=== Ottoman era ===
During early Ottoman rule, in 1596, Baqa ash-Sharqiyya was located in the nahiya of Qaqun in the Sanjak of Nablus. It had a population of 35 Muslim households, and paid taxes on wheat, barley, summer crops, olives, goats and/or bees, and a press for olives or grapes; a total of 14,000 akçe.

In 1838 it was noted as a village, Bakah, in the western Esh-Sha'rawiyeh administrative region, north of Nablus.

In 1870/1871 (1288 AH), an Ottoman census listed the village in the nahiya (sub-district) of al-Sha'rawiyya al-Sharqiyya.

In 1882 the PEF's Survey of Western Palestine described Baqa as "a very small hamlet on high ground, with olives. It has a well to the south and a little Mukam (Muslim tomb) to the north; scattered olives surround it, and there are two or three palms close by. A few houses stand separate, on the south east, near a second Mukam, called Abu Nar ("Father of Fire")." A stone with Arabic inscriptions located over the entrance of the old village mosque could be the beginning of an endowment (waqf) text.

A population list from about 1887 showed that Baqa ash-Sharqiyya had about 180 inhabitants, all Muslim.

=== British Mandate era ===
In the 1922 census of Palestine conducted by the British Mandate authorities, Baqa Sharkiyeh had a population of 269, all Muslims, increasing by the 1931 census to 330, still all Muslim, in 67 houses.

In the 1945 statistics the population of Baqa ash-Sharqiyya consisted of 480, all Muslim, with a land area of 3,986 dunams, according to an official land and population survey. Of this, 173 dunams were designated for plantations and irrigable land, 2,870 for cereals, while 14 dunams were built-up areas.

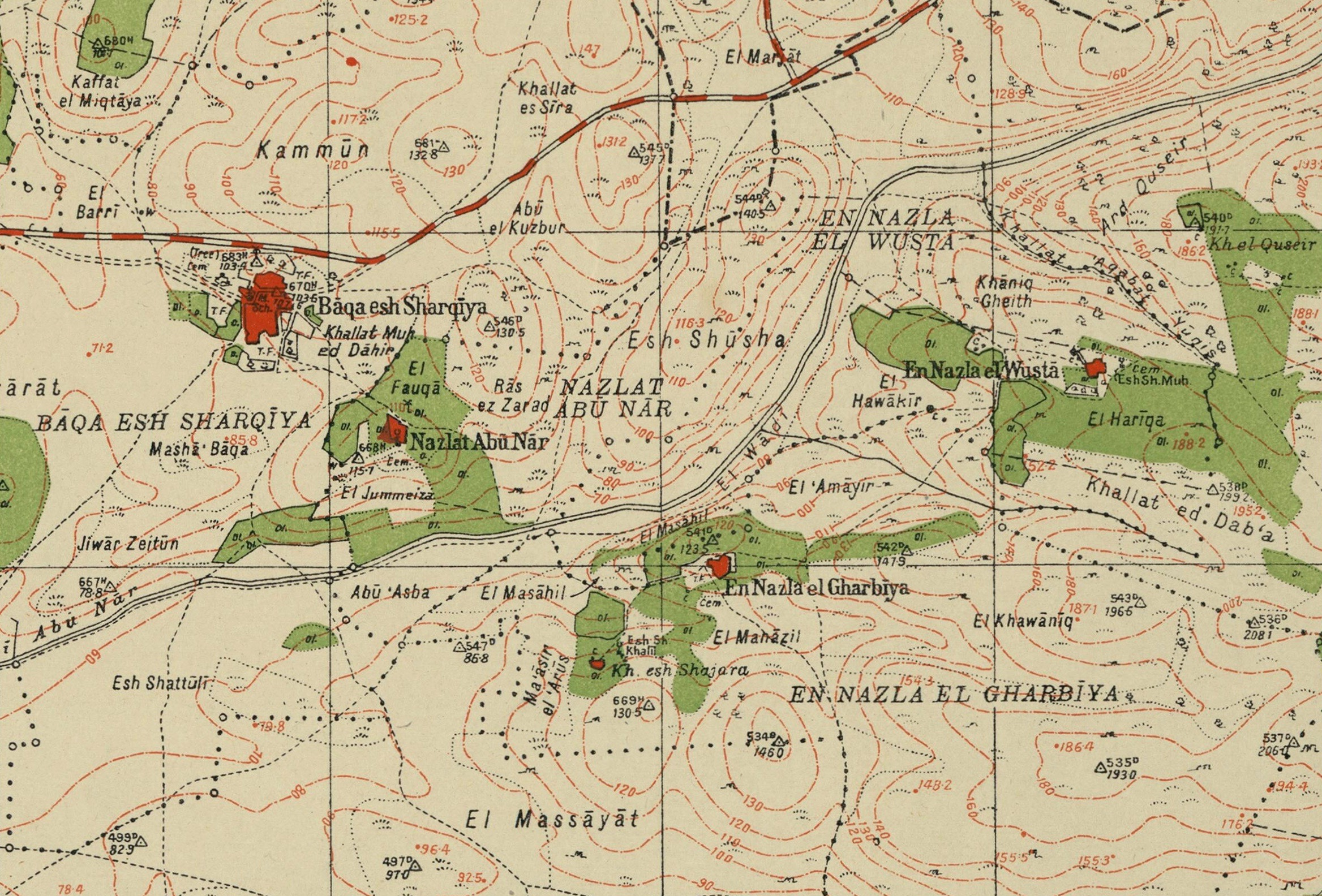
Baqa ash Sharqiyya with Nazlat Abu Nar 1942 1:20,000

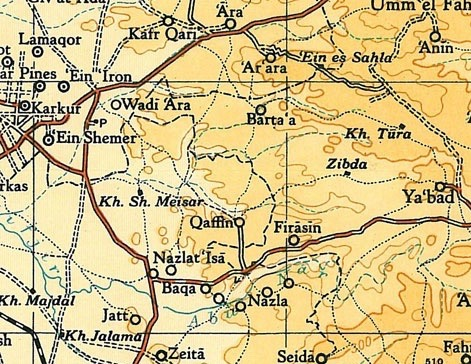
Baqa ash Sharqiyya 1945 1:250,000

=== Jordanian era ===
In the wake of the 1948 Arab–Israeli War, and after the 1949 Armistice Agreements, Baqa ash-Sharqiyya came under Jordanian rule. As part of the 1949 armistice agreements following the 1948 Arab-Israeli war, King Abdullah of Jordan ceded the captured Wadi Ara region to Israel in exchange for land near Hebron. This resulted in Baqa al-Gharbiyye falling on the western side of the Green Line, separated from its eastern counterpart, Baqa ash Sharqiyya. The separated towns still have close social and economic ties, however this has been reduced due to the completion of the West Bank barrier around the "Baqa enclave" of the Seam Zone.

In 1961, the population was 952.

=== Post-1967 ===
After the Six-Day War in 1967, Baqa ash-Sharqiyya has been under Israeli occupation.

On 27 February 1988 Rawda Najib Hassa, aged 13, was shot dead in Baqa ash-Sharqiyya. The suspected killer was an Israeli citizen from Halamish but was not charged due to lack of evidence.

==== Health care ====
Baqa ash-Sharqiyya houses the Mother and Child Health Centre (MCH), which is used by the three surrounding Palestinian villages (Nazlat Abu Nar and An-Nazla al-Gharbiya). The healthcare facilities for Baqa ash-Sharqiyya are designated as MOH level 3.

== Bibliography ==
- Barron, J.B., ed. (1923). Palestine: Report and General Abstracts of the Census of 1922. Government of Palestine.
- Conder, C.R.; Kitchener, H.H. (1882). The Survey of Western Palestine: Memoirs of the Topography, Orography, Hydrography, and Archaeology. Vol. 2. London: Committee of the Palestine Exploration Fund.
- Government of Jordan, Department of Statistics (1964). First Census of Population and Housing. Volume I: Final Tables; General Characteristics of the Population (PDF).
- Government of Palestine, Department of Statistics (1945). Village Statistics, April, 1945.
- Hadawi, S. (1970). Village Statistics of 1945: A Classification of Land and Area ownership in Palestine. Palestine Liberation Organization Research Center.
- Hütteroth, W.-D.; Abdulfattah, K. (1977). Historical Geography of Palestine, Transjordan and Southern Syria in the Late 16th Century. Erlanger Geographische Arbeiten, Sonderband 5. Erlangen, Germany: Vorstand der Fränkischen Geographischen Gesellschaft. ISBN 3-920405-41-2.
- Ibn al-Furat (1971). J. Riley-Smith (ed.). Ayyubids, Mamluks and Crusaders: Selections from the "Tarikh Al-duwal Wal-muluk" of Ibn Al-Furat : the Text, the Translation. Vol. 2. Translation by Malcolm Cameron Lyons, Ursula Lyons. Cambridge: W. Heffer.
- Mills, E., ed. (1932). Census of Palestine 1931. Population of Villages, Towns and Administrative Areas. Jerusalem: Government of Palestine.
- Palmer, E.H. (1881). The Survey of Western Palestine: Arabic and English Name Lists Collected During the Survey by Lieutenants Conder and Kitchener, R. E. Transliterated and Explained by E.H. Palmer. Committee of the Palestine Exploration Fund.
- Robinson, E.; Smith, E. (1841). Biblical Researches in Palestine, Mount Sinai and Arabia Petraea: A Journal of Travels in the year 1838. Vol. 3. Boston: Crocker & Brewster.
- Schumacher, G. (1888). "Population list of the Liwa of Akka". Quarterly Statement - Palestine Exploration Fund. 20: 169–191.
- Sharon, M. (1997). Corpus Inscriptionum Arabicarum Palaestinae, A. Vol. 1. BRILL. ISBN 90-04-10833-5.
- Zertal, A. (2016). The Manasseh Hill Country Survey: From Nahal 'Iron to Nahal Shechem. Vol. 3. Brill. ISBN 978-9004312302.
