= Al-Ras, Tulkarm =

al-Ras
- Municipality type D (Village council)

Arabic transcription(s)
  - Arabic: الرأس
  - Latin: ar-Ras (official)
- Location of al-Ras within Palestine
- Coordinates: 32°15′06″N 35°03′43″E
- Palestine grid: 155/184
- State: State of Palestine
- Governorate: Tulkarm

Government
  - Type: Village council

Population (2017)
  - Total: 650
- Name meaning: The hill–top

al-Ras (Arabic: الراس) is a Palestinian village in the Tulkarm Governorate in the eastern West Bank, located 7 kilometers South-east of Tulkarm. According to the Palestinian Central Bureau of Statistics, al-Ras had a population of 650 inhabitants in 2017. In 1997, refugees made up 11.1% of the population of al-Ras. The healthcare facilities for al-Ras are based in Kafr Sur, where the facilities are designated as MOH level 2.

== History ==
Ceramics from the Byzantine era have been found here.

Seven ruins are shown on the plan north of this village within about a mile. They are ancient watch towers, like those of Azzun. One of them, known as Gasr Bint esh-Sheikh, dates from the late Hellenistic and early Roman periods.

=== Ottoman era ===
Al-Ras was incorporated into the Ottoman Empire in 1517 with all of Palestine, and in 1596 it appeared in the tax registers as being in the Nahiya of Bani Sa'b of the Liwa of Nablus. It had a population of 25 households, all Muslim. The villagers paid a fixed tax-rate of 33,3% on various agricultural products, including wheat, barley, summer crops, olive trees, goats and/or beehives in addition to occasional revenues and a fixed tax for people of Nablus area; a total of 6,600 akçe. All the revenues went to a waqf.

In 1838, Robinson noted er-Ras as a village in Beni Sa'ab district, west of Nablus.

In 1870/1871 (1288 AH), an Ottoman census listed the village with 23 Household in the nahiya (sub-district) of Bani Sa'b.

In 1882 the PEF's Survey of Western Palestine (SWP) described Er Ras as: "a small hamlet on a high knoll, supplied by cisterns, with olives below on the north."

=== British Mandate era ===
In the 1922 census of Palestine conducted by the British Mandate authorities, Ras had a population of 92 Muslims, increasing in the 1931 census to 119 Muslims, living in 26 houses.

In the 1945 statistics the population of Er Ras was 160 Muslims, with 5,646 dunams of land according to an official land and population survey. Of this, 1,029 dunams were plantations and irrigable land, 2,027 were used for cereals, while 3 dunams were built-up (urban) land.

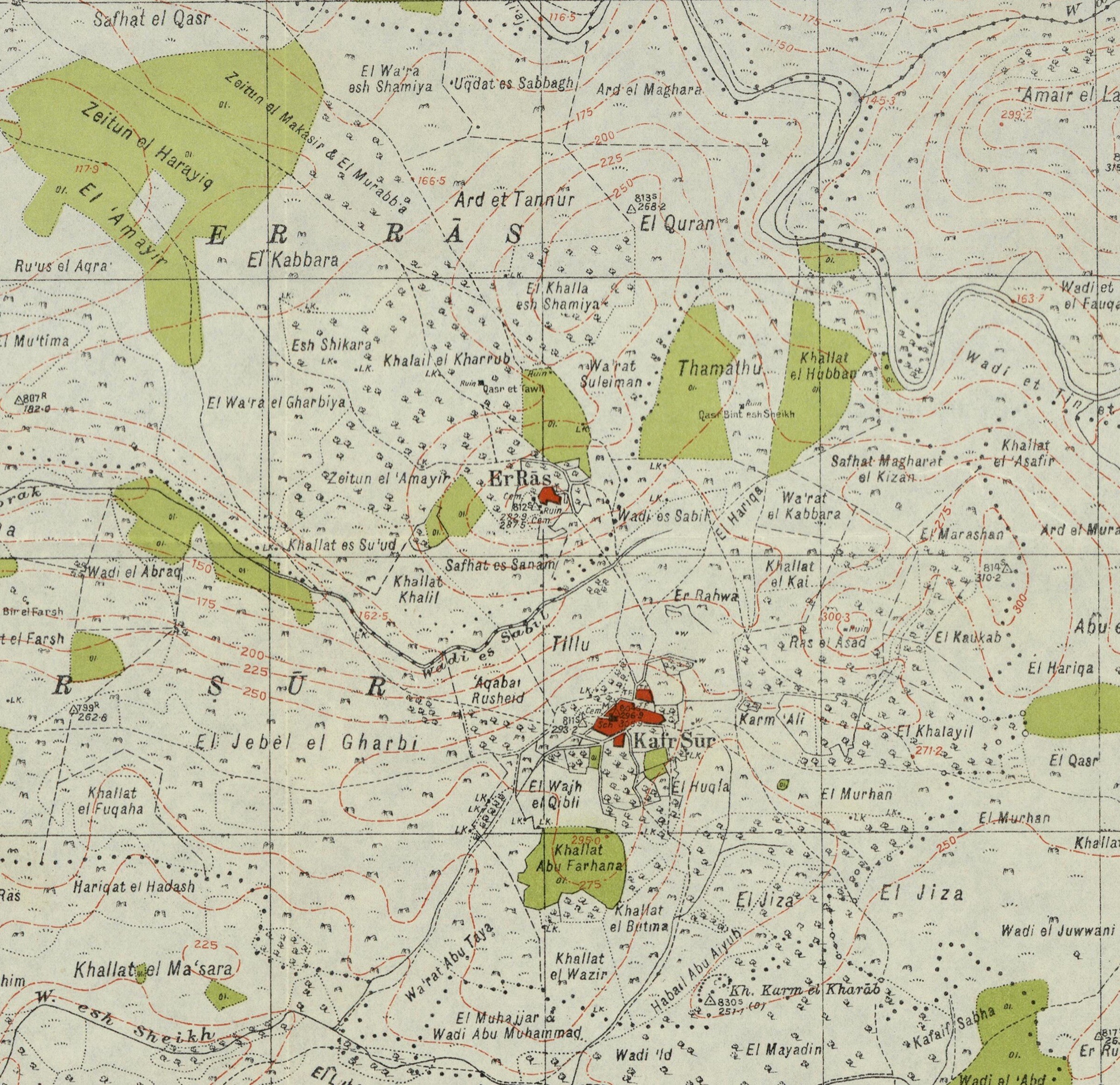
Al-Ras 1942 1:20,000

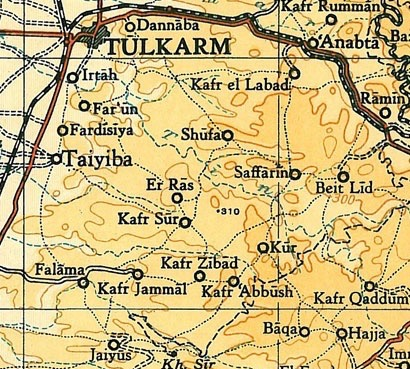
Al-Ras 1945 1:250,000

=== Jordanian era ===
In the wake of the 1948 Arab–Israeli War, and after the 1949 Armistice Agreements, Al-Ras came under Jordanian rule.

In 1961, the population of Al-Ras was 269.

=== Post 1967 ===
Since the Six-Day War in 1967, Al-Ras has been under Israeli occupation.

== Bibliography ==
- Barron, J.B., ed. (1923). Palestine: Report and General Abstracts of the Census of 1922. Government of Palestine.
- Conder, C.R.; Kitchener, H.H. (1882). The Survey of Western Palestine: Memoirs of the Topography, Orography, Hydrography, and Archaeology. Vol. 2. London: Committee of the Palestine Exploration Fund.
- Dauphin, C. (1998). La Palestine byzantine, Peuplement et Populations. BAR International Series 726 (in French). Vol. III : Catalogue. Oxford: Archeopress. ISBN 0-860549-05-4.
- Government of Jordan, Department of Statistics (1964). First Census of Population and Housing. Volume I: Final Tables; General Characteristics of the Population (PDF).
- Government of Palestine, Department of Statistics (1945). Village Statistics, April, 1945.
- Hadawi, S. (1970). Village Statistics of 1945: A Classification of Land and Area ownership in Palestine. Palestine Liberation Organization Research Center. Archived from the original on 2018-12-08.
- Hütteroth, W.-D.; Abdulfattah, K. (1977). Historical Geography of Palestine, Transjordan and Southern Syria in the Late 16th Century. Erlanger Geographische Arbeiten, Sonderband 5. Erlangen, Germany: Vorstand der Fränkischen Geographischen Gesellschaft. ISBN 3-920405-41-2.
- Mills, E., ed. (1932). Census of Palestine 1931. Population of Villages, Towns and Administrative Areas. Jerusalem: Government of Palestine.
- Palmer, E.H. (1881). The Survey of Western Palestine: Arabic and English Name Lists Collected During the Survey by Lieutenants Conder and Kitchener, R. E. Transliterated and Explained by E.H. Palmer. Committee of the Palestine Exploration Fund.
- Robinson, E.; Smith, E. (1841). Biblical Researches in Palestine, Mount Sinai and Arabia Petraea: A Journal of Travels in the year 1838. Vol. 3. Boston: Crocker & Brewster.
