= Iktaba =

- Municipality type D (Village council)

Arabic transcription(s)
  - Arabic: إكتابا
- Location of Iktaba within Palestine
- Coordinates: 32°19′31″N 35°03′11″E
- Palestine grid: 155/192
- State: State of Palestine
- Governorate: Tulkarm

Government
  - Type: Village council

Population (2017)
  - Total: 2,997
- Name meaning: Inscription

Iktaba (Arabic: إكتابا) is a Palestinian town located four kilometers Northeast of the city of Tulkarm in the Tulkarm Governorate in the northern West Bank. According to the Palestinian Central Bureau of Statistics (PCBS), the town had a population of 2,665 inhabitants in 2007 and 2,997 by 2017. Refugees make-up 33% of the entire population in 1997.

== History ==
In 1265, after the Mamluks had defeated the Crusaders, Iktaba (Sabahiya) was mentioned among the estates which Sultan Baibars granted his followers. The village was given to the emir Alam al-Din Tardaj al-Amadi.

=== Ottoman era ===
Iktaba was incorporated into the Ottoman Empire in 1517 with all of Palestine, and in 1596 it appeared in the tax registers under the name of Staba, being in the Nahiya of Qaqun of the Liwa of Nablus. It had a population of 21 households, all Muslims. The villagers paid a fixed tax rate of 33,3% on various agricultural products, such as wheat, barley, summer crops, olive trees, goats and/or beehives, in addition to "occasional revenues" and a press for olive oil or grapes; a total of 4,100 akçe.

In 1870, the French explorer Victor Guérin noted that village, which he called Astaba, was a "Small hamlet located on a high hill. Ancient cisterns testify to the existence here of an ancient locality. Fig trees and pomegranates grow around the dwellings."

In 1882, the PEF's Survey of Western Palestine described it as: "A place to which a certain effendi of Nablus comes down in spring, a sort of 'Azbeh or spring grazing-place for horses"

=== British Mandate era ===
In the 1922 census of Palestine conducted by the British Mandate authorities, Iktaba had a population of 121, all Muslims. In the 1931 census of Palestine, the combined population of Anabta, Iktaba and Nur ash Shams was 2498; 2,457 Muslims, 34 Christians and 1 Druze living in 502 houses.

In the 1945 statistics, the combined population of Anabta and Iktaba was 3,120; 3,080 Muslims and 40 Christians, with a total of 15,445 dunams of land according to an official land and population survey. Of this, a total of 5,908 dunams were plantations and irrigable land, 5,842 were used for cereals, while 84 dunams were built-up (urban) land.

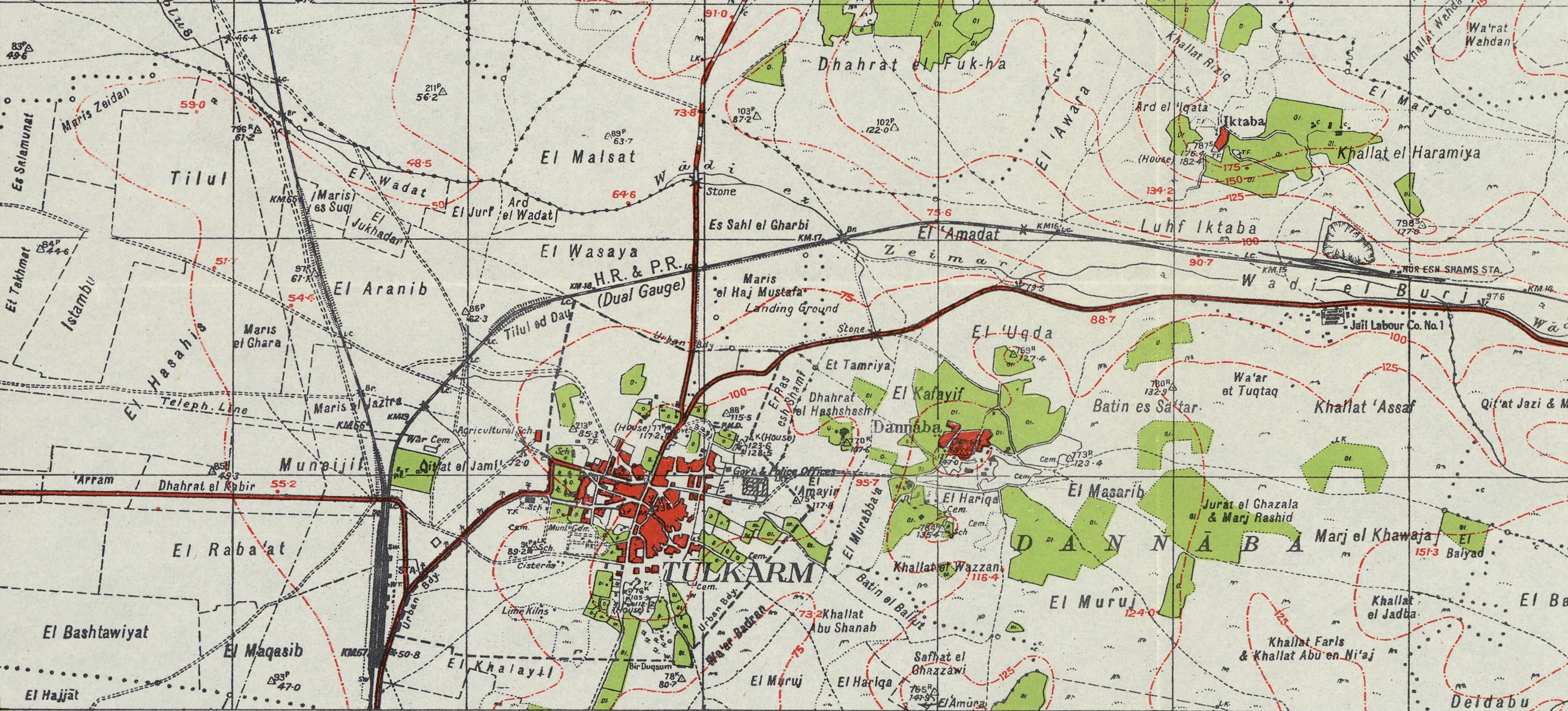
Iktaba 1942 1:20,000

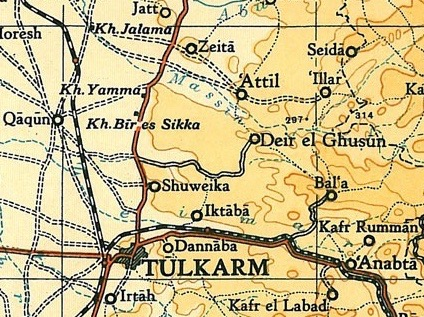
Iktaba 1945 1:250,000

=== Jordanian era ===
After the 1948 Arab–Israeli War and the 1949 Armistice Agreements, Iktaba came under Jordanian rule.

In 1961, the population was 372.

=== Post-1967 ===
After the Six-Day War in 1967, Iktaba has been under Israeli occupation.

== Bibliography ==
- Barron, J.B., ed. (1923). Palestine: Report and General Abstracts of the Census of 1922. Government of Palestine.
- Conder, C.R.; Kitchener, H.H. (1882). The Survey of Western Palestine: Memoirs of the Topography, Orography, Hydrography, and Archaeology. Vol. 2. London: Committee of the Palestine Exploration Fund.
- Government of Jordan, Department of Statistics (1964). First Census of Population and Housing. Volume I: Final Tables; General Characteristics of the Population (PDF).
- Government of Palestine, Department of Statistics (1945). Village Statistics, April, 1945. Government of Palestine.
- Guérin, V. (1875). Description Géographique Historique et Archéologique de la Palestine (in French). Vol. 2: Samarie, pt. 2. Paris: L'Imprimerie Nationale.
- Hadawi, S. (1970). Village Statistics of 1945: A Classification of Land and Area ownership in Palestine. Palestine Liberation Organization Research Center.
- Hütteroth, W.-D.; Abdulfattah, K. (1977). Historical Geography of Palestine, Transjordan and Southern Syria in the Late 16th Century. Erlanger Geographische Arbeiten, Sonderband 5. Erlangen, Germany: Vorstand der Fränkischen Geographischen Gesellschaft. ISBN 3-920405-41-2.
- Ibn al-Furat (1971). J. Riley-Smith (ed.). Ayyubids, Mamluks and Crusaders: Selections from the "Tarikh Al-duwal Wal-muluk" of Ibn Al-Furat : the Text, the Translation. Vol. 2. Translation by Malcolm Cameron Lyons, Ursula Lyons. Cambridge: W. Heffer.
- Mills, E., ed. (1932). Census of Palestine 1931. Population of Villages, Towns and Administrative Areas. Jerusalem: Government of Palestine.
- Palmer, E.H. (1881). The Survey of Western Palestine: Arabic and English Name Lists Collected During the Survey by Lieutenants Conder and Kitchener, R. E. Transliterated and Explained by E.H. Palmer. Committee of the Palestine Exploration Fund.
