= Deir al-Ghusun =

- Municipality type B

Arabic transcription(s)
  - Arabic: دير الغصون
  - Latin: Deir al-Ghusoun (official); Dayr al-Ghusoun (unofficial)
- Location of Deir al-Ghusun within Palestine Deir al-Ghusun (the West Bank)
- Coordinates: 32°21′11″N 35°04′37″E
- Palestine grid: 157/195
- State: Palestine
- Governorate: Tulkarm

Government
  - Type: Municipality (from 1997)
  - Head of Municipality: Nasuh Badran

Area
  - Total: 13.1 km^{2} (5.1 sq mi)

Population (2017)
  - Total: 9,936
  - Density: 758/km^{2} (1,960/sq mi)
- Name meaning: "The convent of the branches"
- Website: www.deiralghusoon.com

Deir al-Ghusun (Arabic: دير الغصون) is a Palestinian town in the Tulkarm Governorate, located eight kilometers northeast of the city of Tulkarm in the northern West Bank, Palestine. The town is near the Green Line (border between Israel and the West Bank). The town had a population of 9,936 in 2017. Its altitude is 200 meters.

== History ==
Pottery remains from the Byzantine, early Muslim and the Middle Ages have been found here.

In 1265, Deir al-Ghusun was mentioned among the estates which Sultan Baibars granted his followers, after he had defeated the Crusaders. The whole of Deir al-Ghusun was given to Emir Badr al-Din Muhammad Bi, son of emir Husam al-Din Baraka Khan.

His father Husam al-Din Baraka Khan was buried in Turba Baraka Khan; a sister was married to Baibars, and became the mother of Al-Said Barakah. A later waqf named the revenues of Deir al-Ghusun and a mosque (masjid), tomb (turba) (presently Khalidi Library), to be given for "the cure of the sick and the preparing of the dead for burial in Jerusalem."

=== Ottoman era ===
Deir el-Ghusun may have been the village marked as "El Dair" on Pierre Jacotin's map surveyed during Napoleon's 1799 invasion during the late Ottoman period. In the middle of the 19th century, it was known for its cotton production.

During the 1834 Peasants' revolt in Palestine, Ibrahim Pasha of Egypt pursued rebels to nearby Zeita. Ninety rebels were slain there, while the rest fled to Deir al-Ghusun. At Deir al-Ghusun, many of the inhabitants and rebels heeded a call by Husayn Abd al-Hadi to flee once the Egyptian troops arrived. In response, rebel commander Qasim had several of the defectors among his ranks killed. Ibrahim Pasha's troops stormed the hill at Deir al-Ghusun and the rebels (mostly members of the Qasim, Jarrar, Jayyusi and Barqawi families) were routed, suffering 300 fatalities.

In 1852, Edward Robinson noted: "From 'Attil we now turned again up the mountain, following the direct road to Nabulus; and taking a guide for Ramin. Leaving the village at 11:15, we descended into the southern basin, and then entered a long shallow valley running up on the right of Deir el-Ghusun and its hill. A string of ten camels, led by donkeys, was slowly climbing the hill to that village. At 11:50 we were at the top of the valley; Deir el-Ghusun bearing north 70°E, half a mile distant. The region is full of olive trees. A valley comes down from the south nearly to the village, and then sweeps round to the west. This we crossed, and then rose upon sloping ground on our left. At 12.05 we came out upon the brow of the deep Valley Mussin, coming from the plain of Fendekumieh; it is said to unite with Wady Abu Nar in the western plain beyond Jett. We reached the bottom of the valley at 12.20; and noticed its deep water-channel, now dry.—The road thus far from 'Attil was evidently very old; but we saw no appearance of pavement. Whether this was the ancient way from Caesarea to Sebaste may be doubted; since a more feasible route exists from the plain along the great Wady Sha'ir, which comes down from Nabulus, and is the next valley south of Wady Mussin."

In 1863, Victor Guérin passed by and noted the village south of Attil. He described it as large, and occupying a hilltop. In 1882, the PEF's Survey of Western Palestine (SWP) described it as "a village of moderate size, on a hill, with a well to the west. On the north is open low ground. It is surrounded with magnificent groves of olives, occupying an area of about three square miles towards the south."

In 1870/1871 (1288 AH), an Ottoman census listed the village in the nahiya (sub-district) of al-Sha'rawiyya al-Gharbiyya.

In the early 20th century, residents of Deir el-Ghusun established agricultural hamlets known as khirba, used mainly during the plowing and harvesting seasons, on the outskirts of the village. From the 1920s onwards, six of them became independent villages.

=== British Mandate era ===
In the 1922 census of Palestine conducted by the British Mandate authorities, Deir al Ghusun had a population of 1,410, all Muslims, increasing by the 1931 census to 2,060, still all Muslim, in 451 houses.

In the 1945 statistics, Deir al-Ghusun was counted with the villages which later made up Zemer, and together they had a population of 2,860 Muslims, with a total of 27,770 dunums of land. Of this, a total of 183 dunams were used for citrus and bananas, 13,757 were for plantations and irrigated land, 11,585 dunums were for cereals, while 94 dunams were classified as built-up (urban) areas.

The villages of Jarisha and Masqufa are located within Deir al-Ghusun but are governed by independent village councils.

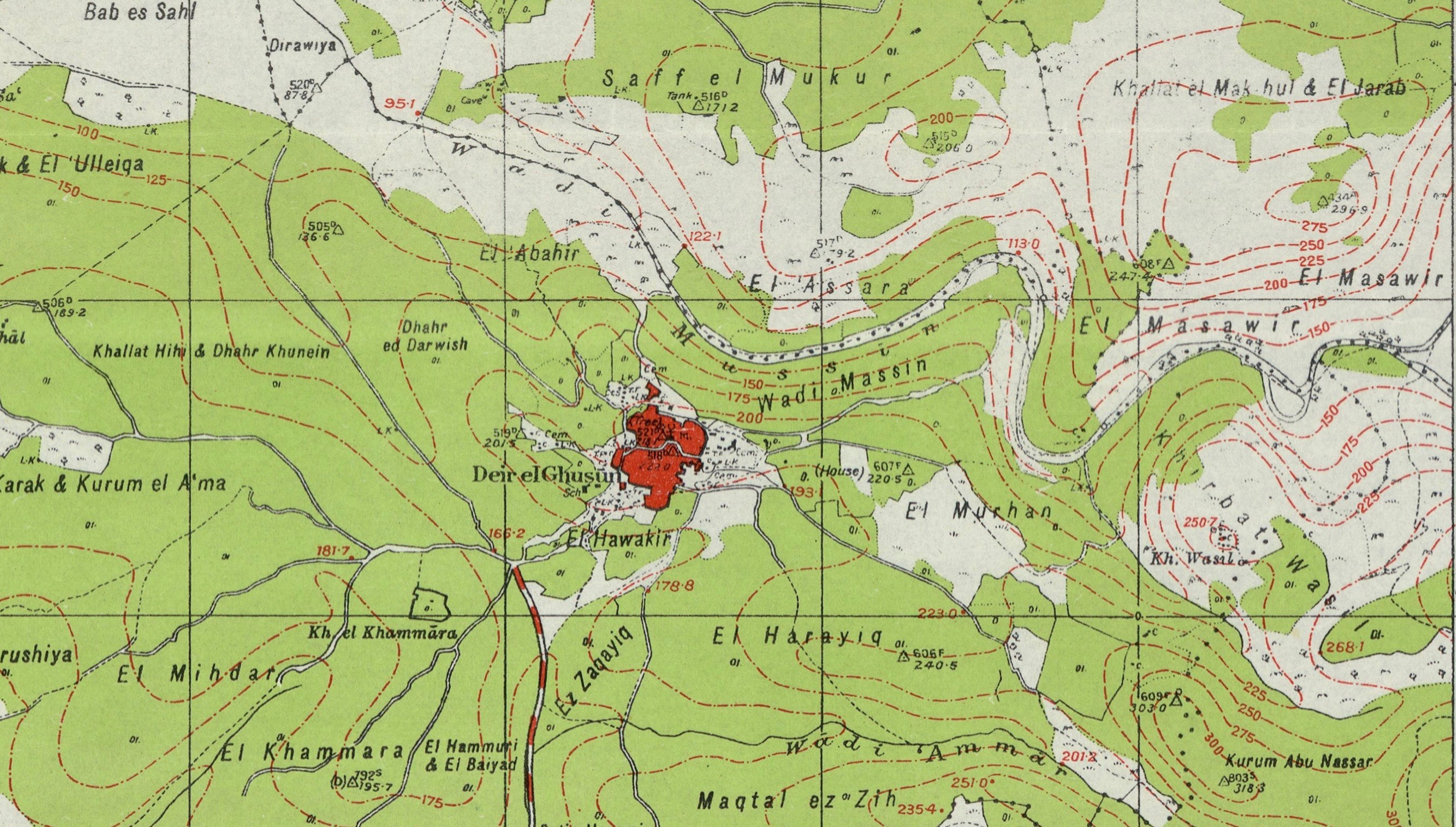
Deir al-Ghusun 1942 1:20,000

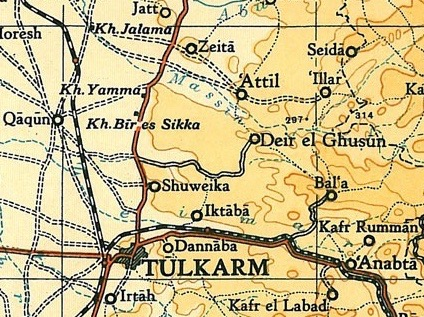
Deir al-Ghusun 1945 1:250,000

=== Jordanian era ===
During 1948 Arab–Israeli War, 14,000 dunams of Deir al-Ghusun land were seized by Israel. After the 1949 Armistice Agreements, Deir al-Ghusun came under Jordanian rule.

In 1961, the population was 3,376.

=== Post-1967 ===
Since the Six-Day War in 1967, Deir al-Ghusun has been under Israeli occupation.

==== Land ====
Currently, its total land area is about 13,000 dunams of which 2,268 is built-up area. Since the establishment of the Palestinian National Authority in 1994, the built-up area of the town increased by over 20% or an annual expansion of 34 dunams by 2000. Agricultural land comprises 7,432 dunams, while the remainder is a part of the Seam Zone.

==== Economy ====
Deir al-Ghusun was more prosperous than other Palestinian towns, however, the confiscation of substantial amounts of cultivable land east of the Green Line, the temporary sanctions against the Palestinian National Authority in 2006-2007, and the disruption of trade and transportation by Israeli West Bank Barrier has somewhat hampered the economy. Agriculture constitutes 50-54% of the local economy, and the town's main agricultural products are olive oil, citrus, melons, cucumbers and nuts.

The commercial sector also provides for the town's residents, but is not very significant. The service sector comprises 25% of the town's income. A reservoir to supply the town with fresh water without the frustration of residents physically transporting water from Tulkarm was built in 2003 and replaced a dysfunctional older water tank, built in 1978.

== Demographics ==
According to the Palestinian Central Bureau of Statistics (PCBS), Deir al-Ghusun had a population of approximately 9,936 inhabitants in 2017. In 1922, the town had a population of 1,410 and according to a census in 1945, the number of inhabitants rose to 2,220. In the PCBS's first official census in 1997, the town had a population of 7,055 inhabitants including 660 refugees. The gender makeup was 3,612 males and 3,443 females.

Approximately 53% of Deir al-Ghusun's residents are within the employment age range (15-64) and females constitute a significant 48% of the local labor force. According to the municipal government, the town's economy was productive and steady in the post-First Intifada period, but decreased by 70% in 2001 at the beginning of the Second Intifada. The unemployment rate increased dramatically from 55% in 1999 to 80% after 2000. Approximately 51% of the households of the town have 1-5 family members, 43% have 6-10 members and 6% have more than 10 members. About 9% of the population in Deir al-Ghusun is illiterate and of this statistic, 83% are women.

=== Local origin ===
In the village, which predominantly saw settlement activities during the 20th century, there was a prominent settlement of Hebronites originating from the village of Sa'ir. Additionally, the village was inhabited by shepherds from various background, including members of the Zidan tribe, who trace their lineage to the tribe of Zahir al-Umar.

=== People from Deir al-Ghusun ===
- Salam Fayyad, politician, born here
- Abd al-Sattar Qasim, writer and academic, born here
- Izzat Ghazzawi, writer, born here

== Bibliography ==
- Barron, J.B., ed. (1923). Palestine: Report and General Abstracts of the Census of 1922. Government of Palestine.
- Doumani, B. (1995). Rediscovering Palestine, Merchants and Peasants in Jabal Nablus, 1700–1900. University of California Press.
- Burgoyne, Michael Hamilton (1987). Mamluk Jerusalem. British School of Archaeology in Jerusalem by the World of Islam Festival Trust. ISBN 090503533X.
- Conder, C.R.; Kitchener, H.H. (1882). The Survey of Western Palestine: Memoirs of the Topography, Orography, Hydrography, and Archaeology. Vol. 2. London: Committee of the Palestine Exploration Fund.
- Government of Jordan, Department of Statistics (1964). First Census of Population and Housing. Volume I: Final Tables; General Characteristics of the Population (PDF).
- Government of Palestine, Department of Statistics (1945). Village Statistics, April, 1945.
- Guérin, V. (1875). Description Géographique Historique et Archéologique de la Palestine. Vol 2 Samarie, pt. 2.
- Hadawi, S. (1970). Village Statistics of 1945: A Classification of Land and Area ownership in Palestine. Palestine Liberation Organization Research Center.
- Hütteroth, Wolf-Dieter; Abdulfattah, Kamal (1977). Historical Geography of Palestine, Transjordan and Southern Syria in the Late 16th Century. Erlanger Geographische Arbeiten, Sonderband 5. Erlangen, Germany: Vorstand der Fränkischen Geographischen Gesellschaft. ISBN 3-920405-41-2. (Typo: p5 on p. 137: not in the table, but placed in the position of Deir al-Ghusun on the map.)
- Ibn al-Furat (1971). Jonathan Riley-Smith (ed.). Ayyubids, Mamluks and Crusaders: Selections from the "Tarikh Al-duwal Wal-muluk" of Ibn Al-Furat : the Text, the Translation. Vol. 2. Translation by Malcolm Cameron Lyons, Ursula Lyons. Cambridge: W. Heffer.
- Karmon, Y. (1960). "An Analysis of Jacotin's Map of Palestine" (PDF). Israel Exploration Journal. 10 (3, 4): 155–173, 244–253. Archived from the original (PDF) on 2019-12-22.
- Macalister, R.A.S.; Masterman, E.W.G. (1906). "Occasional Papers on the Modern inhabitants of Palestine, part III". Quarterly Statement - Palestine Exploration Fund. 38: 33–50. doi:10.1179/peq.1906.38.1.33.
- Mills, E., ed. (1932). Census of Palestine 1931. Population of Villages, Towns and Administrative Areas. Jerusalem: Government of Palestine.
- Palmer, E.H. (1881). The Survey of Western Palestine: Arabic and English Name Lists Collected During the Survey by Lieutenants Conder and Kitchener, R. E. Transliterated and Explained by E.H. Palmer. Committee of the Palestine Exploration Fund.
- Robinson, E.; Smith, E. (1841). Biblical Researches in Palestine, Mount Sinai and Arabia Petraea: A Journal of Travels in the year 1838. Vol. 3. Boston: Crocker & Brewster.
- Robinson, E.; Smith, E. (1856). Later Biblical Researches in Palestine and adjacent regions: A Journal of Travels in the year 1852. London: John Murray.
- Zertal, A. (2016). The Manasseh Hill Country Survey. Vol. 3. Boston: BRILL. ISBN 978-9004312302.
