= Nazlat 'Isa =

Nazlat 'Isa نزلة عيسى
- Municipality type D (Village council)
- Location of Nazlat 'Isa within Palestine
- Coordinates: 32°24′58″N 35°03′20″E
- Palestine grid: 155/202
- State: State of Palestine
- Governorate: Tulkarm

Government
  - Type: Village council

Population (2017)
  - Total: 2,302
- Name meaning: Nuzlet el Masfy: The place of alighting of the side road

Nazlat 'Isa (Arabic: نزلة عيسى) is a Palestinian village in the Tulkarm Governorate in the western West Bank, located 17 kilometres (11 mi) North of Tulkarm.

== History ==
Ceramics from the Byzantine era have been found here, as have cisterns and tombs.

In 1882, the PEF's Survey of Western Palestine described the village, then named Nuzlet el Masfy as: "A small village on the low hills, with wells."

=== British Mandate era ===
In the 1922 census of Palestine conducted by the British Mandate authorities, Nazlet Esa had a population of 203 Muslims, increasing in the 1931 census to 261 Muslims, living in 62 houses.

In the 1945 statistics the population of Nazlat Isa was 380 Muslims, with 2,030 dunams of land according to an official land and population survey. Of this, 684 dunams were for plantations and irrigable land, 750 were used for cereals, while 12 dunams were built-up (urban) land.

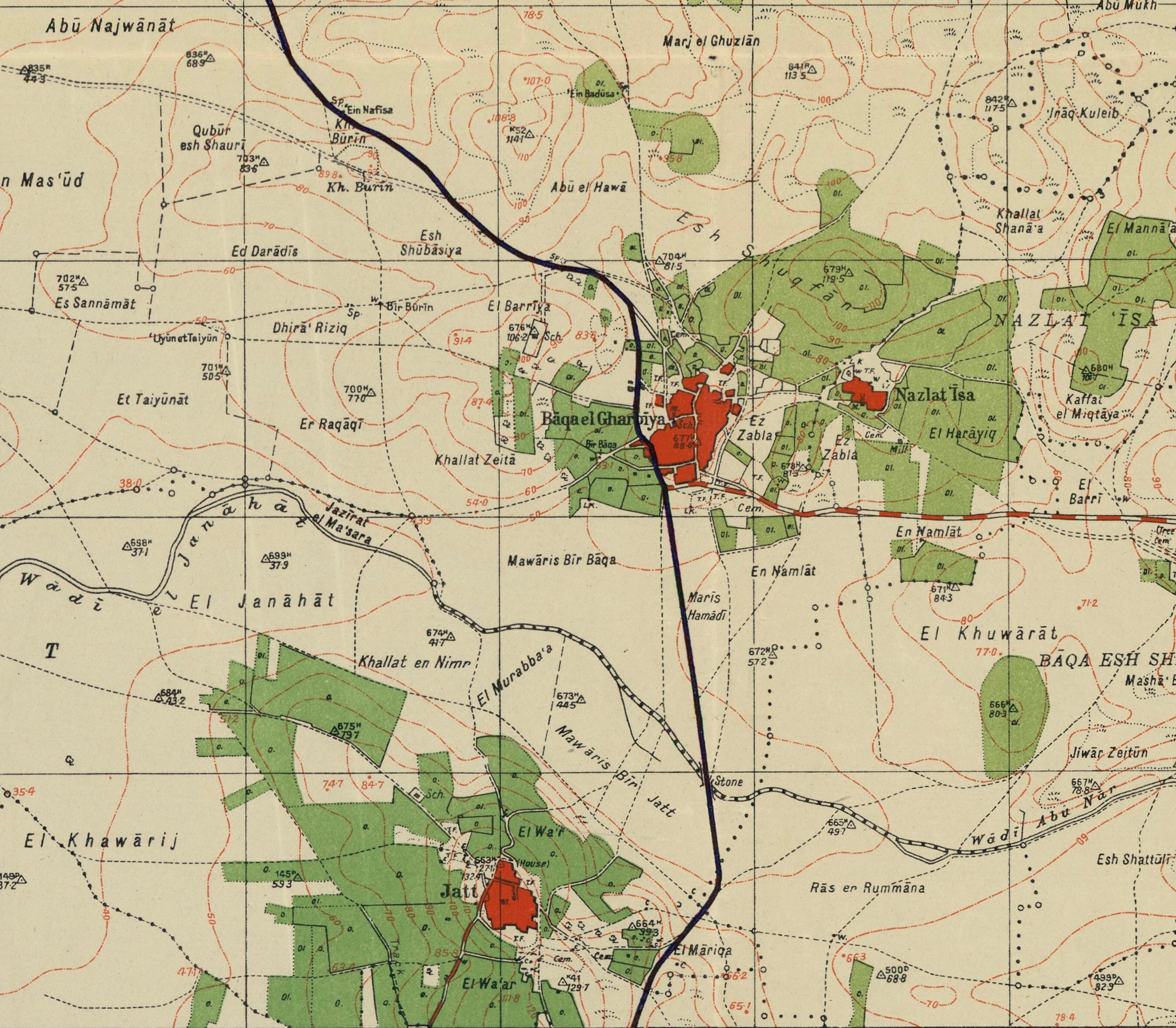
Nazlat 'Isa 1942 1:20,000

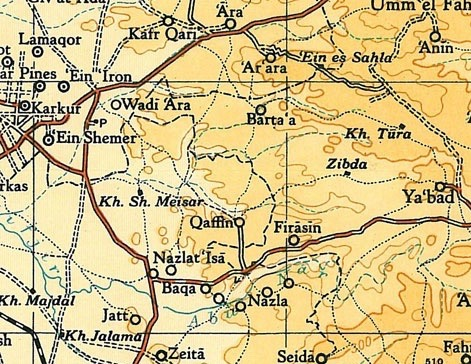
Nazlat 'Isa 1945 1:250,000

=== Jordanian era ===
In the wake of the 1948 Arab–Israeli War, and after the 1949 Armistice Agreements, Nazlat 'Isa came under Jordanian rule.

In 1961, the population of Nazlet 'Ise was 627.

=== Post 1967 ===
Since the Six-Day War in 1967, Nazlat 'Isa has been under Israeli occupation.

In 2003, during the Second Intifada, over 60 shops were destroyed by Israeli civil administration bulldozers. The Israeli civil administration claimed that the shops were demolished because they were built without a permit. Palestinians consider Israeli military curfews and property destruction to constitute collective punishment against innocent Palestinians.

According to the Palestinian Central Bureau of Statistics, Nazlat 'Isa had a population of approximately 2,502 inhabitants in mid-year 2006 and 2,302 inhabitants by 2017. 8.7% of the population of Nazlat 'Isa were refugees in 1997. The healthcare facilities for Nazlat 'Isa are designated as MOH level 2.

== Bibliography ==
- Barron, J.B., ed. (1923). Palestine: Report and General Abstracts of the Census of 1922. Government of Palestine.
- Conder, C.R.; Kitchener, H.H. (1882). The Survey of Western Palestine: Memoirs of the Topography, Orography, Hydrography, and Archaeology. Vol. 2. London: Committee of the Palestine Exploration Fund.
- Dauphin, C. (1998). La Palestine byzantine, Peuplement et Populations. BAR International Series 726 (in French). Vol. III : Catalogue. Oxford: Archeopress. ISBN 0-860549-05-4.
- Government of Jordan, Department of Statistics (1964). First Census of Population and Housing. Volume I: Final Tables; General Characteristics of the Population (PDF).
- Government of Palestine, Department of Statistics (1945). Village Statistics, April, 1945. Government of Palestine.
- Hadawi, S. (1970). Village Statistics of 1945: A Classification of Land and Area ownership in Palestine. Palestine Liberation Organization Research Center.
- Mills, E., ed. (1932). Census of Palestine 1931. Population of Villages, Towns and Administrative Areas. Jerusalem: Government of Palestine.
- Palmer, E.H. (1881). The Survey of Western Palestine: Arabic and English Name Lists Collected During the Survey by Lieutenants Conder and Kitchener, R. E. Transliterated and Explained by E.H. Palmer. Committee of the Palestine Exploration Fund.
