= An-Nazla ash-Sharqiya =

an-Nazla ash-Sharqiya
- Municipality type D (Village council)

Arabic transcription(s)
  - Arabic: النزله الشرقيه
  - Latin: an-Nazleh ash-Sharqiyeh (official)
- Location of an-Nazla ash-Sharqiya within Palestine
- Coordinates: 32°24′42″N 35°06′29″E
- Palestine grid: 160/202
- State: State of Palestine
- Governorate: Tulkarm

Government
  - Type: Village council

Population (2017)
  - Total: 1,623
- Name meaning: The eastern settlement. The word is applied to small suburbs of a village.

An-Nazla ash-Sharqiya (Arabic: النزلة الشرقية) is a Palestinian village in the Tulkarm Governorate in the eastern West Bank, located 18 kilometers North-east of Tulkarm.

== Ottoman Period ==
In 1870/1871 (1288 AH), an Ottoman census listed the village in the nahiya (sub-district) of al-Sha'rawiyya al-Sharqiyya.

In 1882, the PEF's Survey of Western Palestine described Nuzlet ash Sherkiyeh as "a small hamlet, with a well to the south, and a few olives. It stands on high ground, and has a palm tree near."

== British Mandate era ==
In the 1931 census of Palestine, conducted by the British Mandate authorities, Nazla ash Sharqiya had a population of 256 Muslims, in a total of 52 houses.

In the 1945 statistics the population of the village was 300 Muslims, with 4,840 dunams of land according to an official land and population survey. Of this, 723 dunams were plantations and irrigable land, 268 were used for cereals, while 5 dunams were built-up (urban) land.

== Jordanian era ==
In the wake of the 1948 Arab–Israeli War, and after the 1949 Armistice Agreements, An-Nazla ash-Sharqiya came under Jordanian rule. It was annexed by Jordan in 1950.

In 1961, the village's population was 507.

== Post 1967 ==
Since the Six-Day War in 1967, An-Nazla ash-Sharqiya has been under Israeli occupation.

According to the Palestinian Central Bureau of Statistics, an-Nazla ash-Sharqiya had a population of approximately 1,623 inhabitants in 2017. 5.4% of the population of an-Nazla ash-Sharqiya were refugees in 1997. The healthcare facilities for an-Nazla ash-Sharqiya and the villagers of an-Nazla al Wusta are based in an-Nazla ash-Sharqiya, where the facilities are designated as MOH level 2.

== Bibliography ==
- Barron, J.B., ed. (1923). Palestine: Report and General Abstracts of the Census of 1922. Government of Palestine.
- Conder, C.R.; Kitchener, H.H. (1882). The Survey of Western Palestine: Memoirs of the Topography, Orography, Hydrography, and Archaeology. Vol. 2. London: Committee of the Palestine Exploration Fund.
- Government of Jordan, Department of Statistics (1964). First Census of Population and Housing. Volume I: Final Tables; General Characteristics of the Population (PDF).
- Government of Palestine, Department of Statistics (1945). Village Statistics, April, 1945.
- Hadawi, S. (1970). Village Statistics of 1945: A Classification of Land and Area ownership in Palestine. Palestine Liberation Organization Research Center. Archived from the original on 2018-12-08.
- Mills, E., ed. (1932). Census of Palestine 1931. Population of Villages, Towns and Administrative Areas. Jerusalem: Government of Palestine.
- Palmer, E.H. (1881). The Survey of Western Palestine: Arabic and English Name Lists Collected During the Survey by Lieutenants Conder and Kitchener, R. E. Transliterated and Explained by E.H. Palmer. Committee of the Palestine Exploration Fund.
- Zertal, A. (2016). The Manasseh Hill Country Survey. Vol. 3. Boston: BRILL. ISBN 978-9004312302.
