= 1936 Tulkarm shooting =

Civilian attack in Anabta, Palestine

- Part of the 1936–1939 Arab revolt in Palestine
- Location: 32°18′26″N 35°07′10″E; Anabta, Mandatory Palestine
- Date: 15 April 1936
- Attack type: Shooting, execution
- Deaths: 2
- Injuries: 1
- Perpetrator: Palestinian Arabs

The 1936 Tulkarm shooting of two Jews on the road between Anabta and Tulkarm took place in British Mandatory Palestine. Jews retaliated the next day against Arabs in Tel Aviv and killed two in Petah Tikvah.

== Incident ==
On the evening of 15 April 1936, a group of Arabs believed to be followers of Izz al-Din al-Qassam near Anabta constructed a roadblock on the road between Nablus and Tulkarm, stopping about 20 vehicles moving along that road, and demanding arms and cash from the drivers. The Arabs separated two Jewish drivers and one passenger (Israel Hazan) from the others and shot them. Two of the shooting victims died; one survived. The Arabs told their victims that they were gathering the money and munitions to carry on the work of the "Holy Martyrs" who had worked with Izz ad-Din al-Qassam (then recently killed) with the goal of killing "all Jews and Britons in Palestine."

One of the other drivers in the convoy was left unharmed when he shouted "I am a Christian German," and was told to "Go ahead for Hitler's sake."

One of the two dead, Zvi Danenberg, was driving a truckload of crated chickens to Tel Aviv. Danenberg survived for five days before dying of his wounds. The other, Yisrael Hazan, aged 70, died immediately after being shot; he had recently immigrated to Palestine from Salonika. He is buried in the Trumpeldor Cemetery.

== Funeral and protests ==
Two Arab laborers were killed on the following night near Petah Tikva, one describing the attackers as Jews before he died.

Hazan's 17 April funeral in Tel Aviv was the scene of demonstrations with thousands of protestors marching against the British administration in Palestine and against Arab attacks on Jews. "All the stores in the city were closed. The factories also stopped work during the funeral."

According to a British report, on 17 April, cases of assault by Jews against Arabs "took place in Herzl Street, ha-Yarkon Street, Allenby Road near the General Post Office, outside the Cinema Moghraby and at the seashore bus terminus".

The Anabta/Tulkarm shooting is widely seen as prelude to or as the beginning of the violence and killings of the 1936–1939 Arab revolt in Palestine, which began on The Bloody Day in Jaffa, 19 April 1936. Within days, memorial books were being sold with Hazan's photo on the cover, and a text describing him as "the first victim," and promising yizkor memorial prayers along with "pictures and facts" about Jews killed by Arabs during Nisan 5696 (roughly corresponding to April 1936).

== Consequences ==
In the aftermath of the incidents in April, the British authorities adopted a form of statutory military law consisting of reprisals and collective punishment, which often served to strike at the general population due to the fact that actual insurgents, who were supported by the civilian populace, were difficult to identify. Measures taken included the destruction of property during searches (which included houses and food stocks); an Arab insurgent noted that since British security forces were largely unable to strike at them, they resorted to "revenge" and "collective punishment". These tactics achieved some measure of success during the 1936–1939 revolt, although they never achieved the desired level of effectiveness. The British authorities heavily censored Arab-language newspapers in Palestine, which led to such tactics to go unreported, although such censorship did not apply to Hebrew-language press in the Mandate, which managed to obtain a significant coverage of British military actions in the field.
