= Kafr Abbush =

Kafr 'Abbush
- Municipality type D (Village council)

Arabic transcription(s)
  - Arabic: كفر عبّوش
- Location of Kafr 'Abbush within Palestine
- Coordinates: 32°13′20″N 35°05′04″E
- Palestine grid: 158/181
- State: State of Palestine
- Governorate: Tulkarm

Government
  - Type: Village council

Population (2017)
  - Total: 1,739
- Name meaning: The village of Abbush

Kafr 'Abbush (Arabic: كفر عبّوش) is a Palestinian town in the Tulkarm Governorate in the northwestern West Bank. According to the Palestinian Central Bureau of Statistics, Kafr 'Abbush had a population of approximately 1,488 inhabitants in mid-year 2006 and 1,739 by 2017. 24.8% of the population of Kafr 'Abbush were refugees in 1997. The healthcare facilities for Kafr 'Abbush are based in Kafr 'Abbush, where the facilities are designated as MOH level 2.

== History ==
Archeological findings from Kafr 'Abbush include potsherds from the Byzantine era and two menorahs carved in stone.

=== Ottoman era ===
Kafr 'Abbush was incorporated into the Ottoman Empire in 1517 with all of Palestine, and in 1596 it appeared under the name of Abbush in the tax registers as being in the Nahiya of Bani Sa'b, part of Nablus Sanjak. It had a population of 19 Muslim households. The villagers paid a fixed tax rate of 33.3% on various agricultural products, such as wheat, barley, summer crops, olive trees, goats and/or beehives, in addition to "occasional revenues" and a press for olive oil or grape syrup; a total of 4,974 akçe.

In the 16th century, he neighboring village of Beit Jiffa was listed as inhabited, but it became abandoned before the 19th century, with its land being absorbed by Kafr 'Abbush.

In 1838, Robinson noted Kefr 'Abush as a village in Beni Sa'ab district, west of Nablus. In 1870/1871 (1288 AH), an Ottoman census listed the village in the nahiya (sub-district) of Bani Sa'b.

In the 1860s, the Ottoman authorities granted the village an agricultural plot of land called Ghabat Kafr 'Abbush in the former confines of the Forest of Arsur (Ar. Al-Ghaba) in the coastal plain, west of the village.

In 1882, the PEF's Survey of Western Palestine (SWP) described Kafr Abbush as: "a stone village of moderate size, on steep round hill, with a few olives. It is supplied by cisterns. The ground is very rugged near it."

=== British Mandate era ===
In the 1922 census of Palestine conducted by the British Mandate authorities, Kafr Abbush had a population of 263 Muslims, increasing in the 1931 census to 360 Muslims, in 63 houses.

In the 1945 statistics the population of Kafr Abbush was 480 Muslims, with 4,923 dunams of land according to an official land and population survey. Of this, 952 dunams were plantations and irrigable land, 1,047 were used for cereals, while 11 dunams were built-up (urban) land.

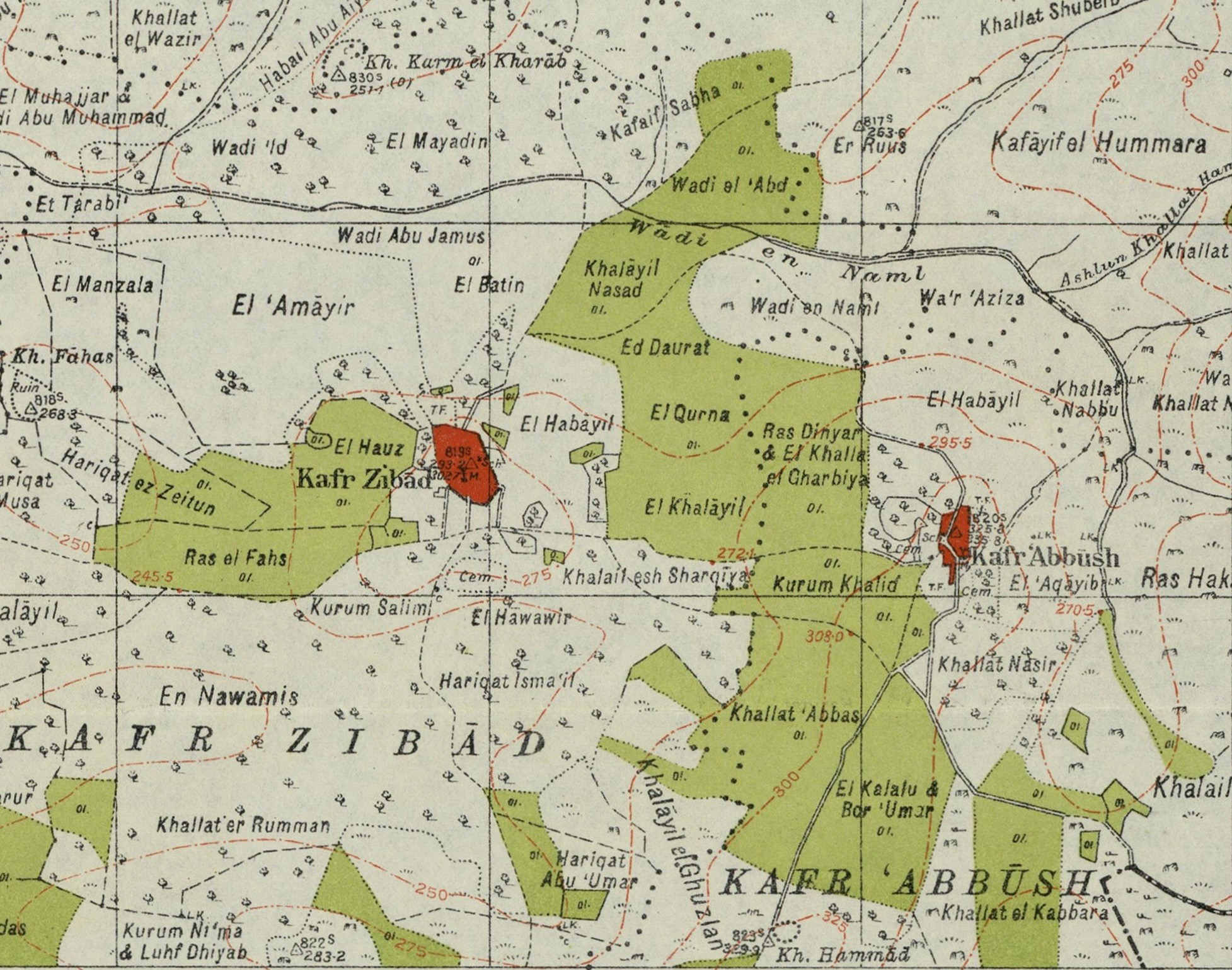
Kafr Abbush 1942 1:20,000

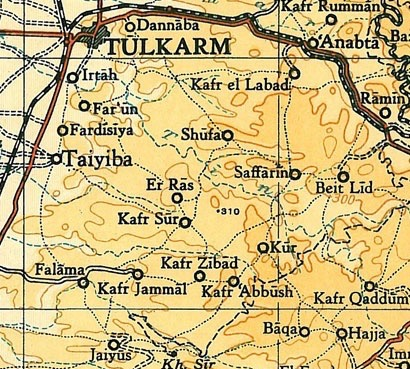
Kafr Abbush 1945 1:250,000

=== Jordanian era ===
In the wake of the 1948 Arab–Israeli War, and after the 1949 Armistice Agreements, Kafr Abbush came under Jordanian rule.

In 1961, the population of Kafr Abbush was 704.

=== Post 1967 ===
Since the Six-Day War in 1967, Kafr Abbush has been under Israeli occupation.

== Demography ==
=== Local origins ===
Residents of Kafr Abbush originally came from Egypt and Kafr Majdal (one village near Taybeh) in the 16th century.

== Bibliography ==
- Barron, J.B., ed. (1923). Palestine: Report and General Abstracts of the Census of 1922. Government of Palestine.
- Conder, C.R.; Kitchener, H.H. (1882). The Survey of Western Palestine: Memoirs of the Topography, Orography, Hydrography, and Archaeology. Vol. 2. London: Committee of the Palestine Exploration Fund.
- Dauphin, C. (1998). La Palestine byzantine, Peuplement et Populations. BAR International Series 726 (in French). Vol. III : Catalogue. Oxford: Archeopress. ISBN 0-860549-05-4.
- Government of Jordan, Department of Statistics (1964). First Census of Population and Housing. Volume I: Final Tables; General Characteristics of the Population (PDF).
- Government of Palestine, Department of Statistics (1945). Village Statistics, April, 1945. Government of Palestine.
- Hadawi, S. (1970). Village Statistics of 1945: A Classification of Land and Area ownership in Palestine. Palestine Liberation Organization Research Center.
- Hütteroth, W.-D.; Abdulfattah, K. (1977). Historical Geography of Palestine, Transjordan and Southern Syria in the Late 16th Century. Erlanger Geographische Arbeiten, Sonderband 5. Erlangen, Germany: Vorstand der Fränkischen Geographischen Gesellschaft. ISBN 3-920405-41-2.
- Mills, E., ed. (1932). Census of Palestine 1931. Population of Villages, Towns and Administrative Areas. Jerusalem: Government of Palestine.
- Palmer, E.H. (1881). The Survey of Western Palestine: Arabic and English Name Lists Collected During the Survey by Lieutenants Conder and Kitchener, R. E. Transliterated and Explained by E.H. Palmer. Committee of the Palestine Exploration Fund.
- Robinson, E.; Smith, E. (1841). Biblical Researches in Palestine, Mount Sinai and Arabia Petraea: A Journal of Travels in the year 1838. Vol. 3. Boston: Crocker & Brewster.
