= An-Nazla al-Gharbiya =

an-Nazla al-Gharbiya
- Municipality type D (Village council)

Arabic transcription(s)
  - Arabic: النزله الغربيه
- Location of an-Nazla al-Gharbiya within Palestine
- Coordinates: 32°24′10″N 35°05′04″E
- Palestine grid: 158/200
- State: State of Palestine
- Governorate: Tulkarm

Government
  - Type: Village council

Population (2017)
  - Total: 1,110
- Name meaning: Nuzlet et Tinat: the settlement of the fig-trees

An-Nazla al-Gharbiya (Arabic: النزلة الغربية) is a Palestinian village in the Tulkarm Governorate of the western West Bank, located 16 kilometers North of Tulkarm.

== History ==
Pottery remains from the Roman era have been found here.

Southwest of the village, on the top of hill, is the tomb of Sheikh Khalil. It is constructed of old, reused stones, and pottery sherds from the Byzantine era have been found here.

Pottery from the early Muslim and the Middle Ages have been found here.

=== Ottoman era ===
In 1870/1871 (1288 AH), an Ottoman census listed the village in the nahiya (sub-district) of al-Sha'rawiyya al-Sharqiyya.

In 1882, the PEF's Survey of Western Palestine described An-Nazla al-Gharbiya, then called Nuzlet et Tinat: "A little hamlet with fig trees, and a well to the west on low ground. It has caves opposite to it on the south."

=== British Mandate era ===
In the 1931 census of Palestine, conducted by the British Mandate authorities, Nazla al Gharbiya had a population of 64 Muslims, in a total of 13 houses.

In the 1945 statistics the population of Nazla el Gharbiya was 100 Muslims, with 2,320 dunams of land according to an official land and population survey. Of this, 182 dunams were plantations and irrigable land, 556 were used for cereals, while 2 dunams were built-up (urban) land.

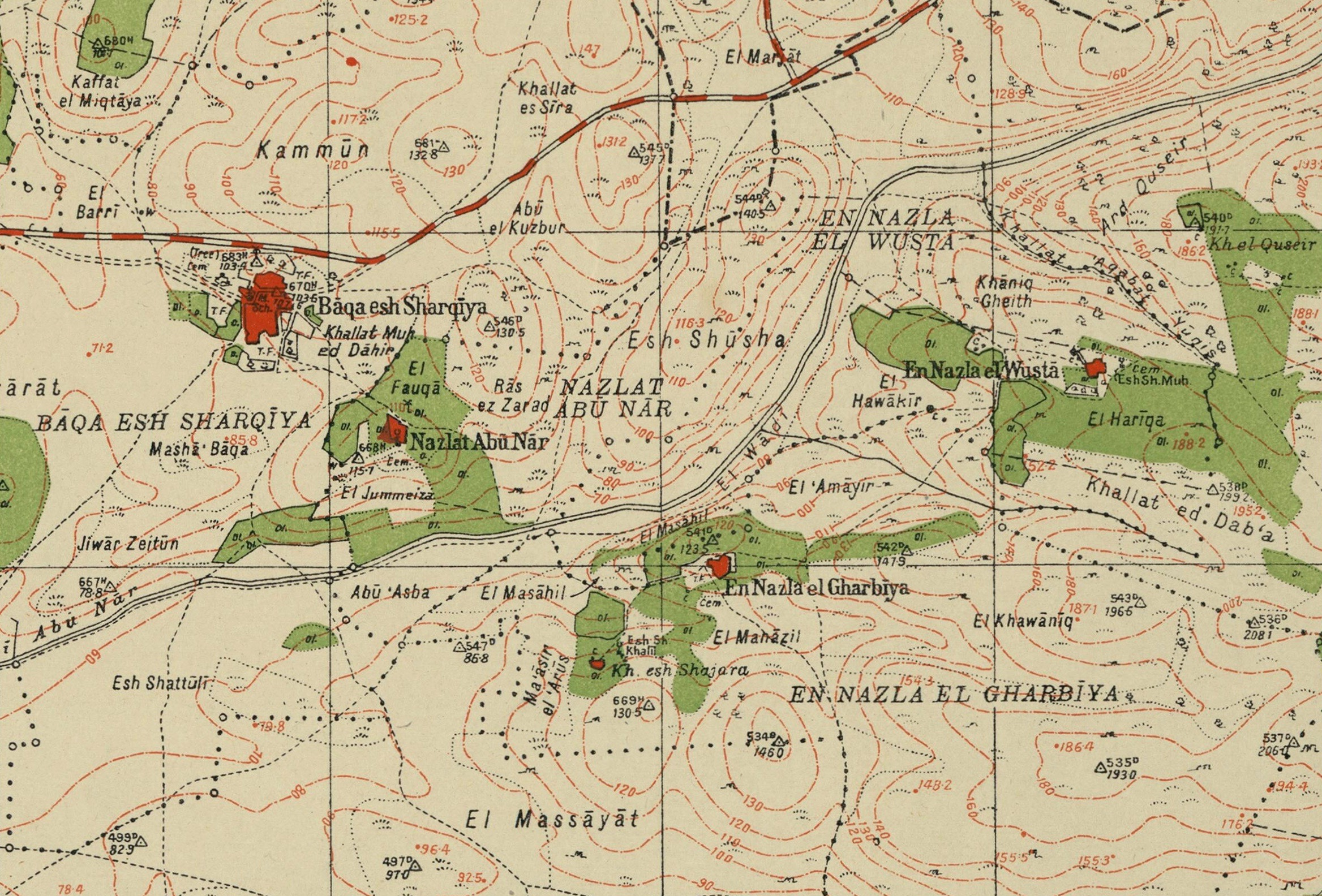
an-Nazla al-Gharbiya 1942 1:20,000

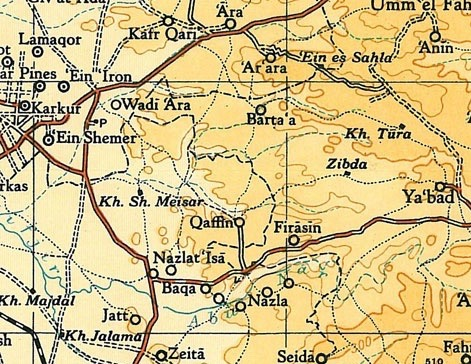
an-Nazla al-Gharbiya 1945 1:250,000

=== Jordanian era ===
In the wake of the 1948 Arab–Israeli War, and after the 1949 Armistice Agreements, An-Nazla al-Gharbiya came under Jordanian rule.

In 1961, the population of Nazla Gharbiya was 187.

=== Post 1967 ===
After the Six-Day War in 1967, An-Nazla al-Gharbiya has been under Israeli occupation.

According to the Palestinian Central Bureau of Statistics, an-Nazla al-Gharbiya had a population of approximately 1,110 inhabitants in 2017. 6.1% of the population of an-Nazla al-Gharbiya were refugees in 1997. The healthcare facilities for the surrounding villages are based in Baqa ash-Sharqiyya, where the facilities are designated as MOH level 3.

== Bibliography ==
- Barron, J.B., ed. (1923). Palestine: Report and General Abstracts of the Census of 1922. Government of Palestine.
- Conder, C.R.; Kitchener, H.H. (1882). The Survey of Western Palestine: Memoirs of the Topography, Orography, Hydrography, and Archaeology. Vol. 2. London: Committee of the Palestine Exploration Fund.
- Dauphin, C. (1998). La Palestine byzantine, Peuplement et Populations. BAR International Series 726 (in French). Vol. III : Catalogue. Oxford: Archeopress. ISBN 0-860549-05-4.
- Government of Jordan, Department of Statistics (1964). First Census of Population and Housing. Volume I: Final Tables; General Characteristics of the Population (PDF).
- Government of Palestine, Department of Statistics (1945). Village Statistics, April, 1945.
- Hadawi, S. (1970). Village Statistics of 1945: A Classification of Land and Area ownership in Palestine. Palestine Liberation Organization Research Center. Archived from the original on 2018-12-08.
- Mills, E., ed. (1932). Census of Palestine 1931. Population of Villages, Towns and Administrative Areas. Jerusalem: Government of Palestine.
- Palmer, E.H. (1881). The Survey of Western Palestine: Arabic and English Name Lists Collected During the Survey by Lieutenants Conder and Kitchener, R. E. Transliterated and Explained by E.H. Palmer. Committee of the Palestine Exploration Fund.
- Zertal, A. (2016). The Manasseh Hill Country Survey. Vol. 3. Boston: BRILL. ISBN 978-9004312302.
