= Kafr Rumman =

- Municipality type C

Arabic transcription(s)
  - Arabic: كفر رمّان
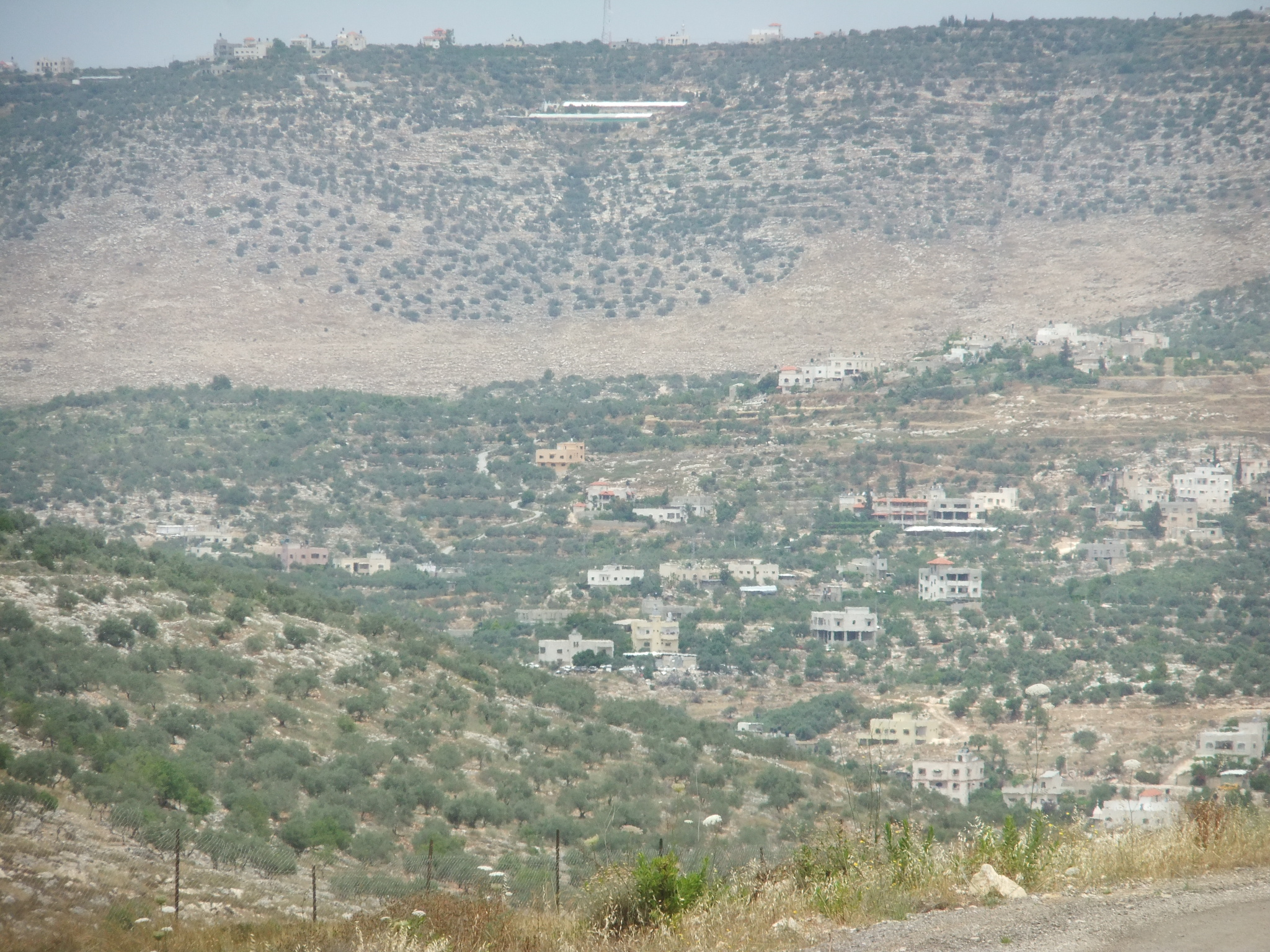
- Kafr Rumman, seen from the Israeli settlement of Einav

- Location of Kafr Rumman within Palestine
- Coordinates: 32°19′01″N 35°07′36″E
- Palestine grid: 162/191
- State: State of Palestine
- Governorate: Tulkarm

Government
  - Type: Municipality

Population (2007)
  - Total: 869
- Name meaning: The village of the pomegranates (=Rimmon)

Kafr Rumman (Arabic: كفر رمّان) is a Palestinian town in the Tulkarm Governorate in the eastern West Bank, located 11 kilometers East of Tulkarm. According to the Palestinian Central Bureau of Statistics, Kafr Rumman had a population of approximately 869 inhabitants in mid-year 2007.

== History ==
Potsherd from the Middle Bronze Age IIB, Iron Age II, Persian, Hellenistic, Roman, Byzantine and early Muslim eras have been found here.

=== Ottoman era ===
Kafr Rumman, like all of Palestine was incorporated into the Ottoman Empire in 1517. In the 1596 tax registers, it was part of the nahiya ("subdistrict") of Jabal Sami, part of the larger Sanjak of Nablus. It had a population of 20 households, all Muslims. The inhabitants paid a fixed tax rate of 33,3% on agricultural products, including wheat, barley, summer crops, olive trees, goats and beehives, in addition to occasional revenues and a press for olive oil or grape syrup, and a fixed tax for people of Nablus area; a total of 3,022 akçe.

The old core of the village is presumed to have been built in the 16th-17th century CE, and contains high, fortified buildings.

In 1838 Kefr Rumman was placed in the Wady esh-Sha'ir administrative region, west of Nablus.

In 1870 Victor Guérin noted it from nearby Ramin.

In 1870/1871 (1288 AH), an Ottoman census listed the village in the nahiya (sub-district) of Wadi al-Sha'ir.

In 1882 the PEF's Survey of Western Palestine (SWP) described Kefr Rumman as: "a small hamlet on the side of the mountain, with a well to the north and olives."

=== British Mandate era ===
In the 1922 census of Palestine conducted by the British Mandate authorities, Kufr Rumman had a population of 161 Muslims, increasing in the 1931 census to 189 Muslims, in 48 houses.

In the 1945 statistics the population of Kafr Rumman was 270 Muslims, with 3,933 dunams of land according to an official land and population survey. Of this, 625 dunams were plantations and irrigable land, 352 were used for cereals, while 5 dunams were built-up (urban) land.

=== Jordanian era ===
In the wake of the 1948 Arab–Israeli War, and after the 1949 Armistice Agreements, Kafr Rumman came under Jordanian rule.

In 1961, the population was 466.

=== Post 1967 ===
Since the Six-Day War in 1967, Kafr Rumman has been under Israeli occupation. In 1997, Kafr Rumman had a population of 649, of whom 45.5% were registered refugees.

== Bibliography ==
- Barron, J.B., ed. (1923). Palestine: Report and General Abstracts of the Census of 1922. Government of Palestine.
- Conder, C.R.; Kitchener, H.H. (1882). The Survey of Western Palestine: Memoirs of the Topography, Orography, Hydrography, and Archaeology. Vol. 2. London: Committee of the Palestine Exploration Fund.
- Dauphin, C. (1998). La Palestine byzantine, Peuplement et Populations. BAR International Series 726 (in French). Vol. III : Catalogue. Oxford: Archeopress. ISBN 0-860549-05-4.
- Government of Jordan, Department of Statistics (1964). First Census of Population and Housing. Volume I: Final Tables; General Characteristics of the Population (PDF).
- Government of Palestine, Department of Statistics (1945). Village Statistics, April, 1945.
- Guérin, V. (1875). Description Géographique Historique et Archéologique de la Palestine (in French). Vol. 2: Samarie, pt. 2. Paris: L'Imprimerie Nationale.
- Hadawi, S. (1970). Village Statistics of 1945: A Classification of Land and Area ownership in Palestine. Palestine Liberation Organization Research Center.
- Hütteroth, W.-D.; Abdulfattah, K. (1977). Historical Geography of Palestine, Transjordan and Southern Syria in the Late 16th Century. Erlanger Geographische Arbeiten, Sonderband 5. Erlangen, Germany: Vorstand der Fränkischen Geographischen Gesellschaft. ISBN 3-920405-41-2.
- Mills, E., ed. (1932). Census of Palestine 1931. Population of Villages, Towns and Administrative Areas. Jerusalem: Government of Palestine.
- Palmer, E.H. (1881). The Survey of Western Palestine: Arabic and English Name Lists Collected During the Survey by Lieutenants Conder and Kitchener, R. E. Transliterated and Explained by E.H. Palmer. Committee of the Palestine Exploration Fund.
- Robinson, E.; Smith, E. (1841). Biblical Researches in Palestine, Mount Sinai and Arabia Petraea: A Journal of Travels in the year 1838. Vol. 3. Boston: Crocker & Brewster.
- Zertal, A. (2004). The Manasseh Hill Country Survey. Vol. 1. Boston: BRILL. ISBN 9004137564.
