= Tulkarm Governorate =

Governorate of Palestine

Coordinates: 32°19′11.5″N 35°5′38.5″E

- Governorate
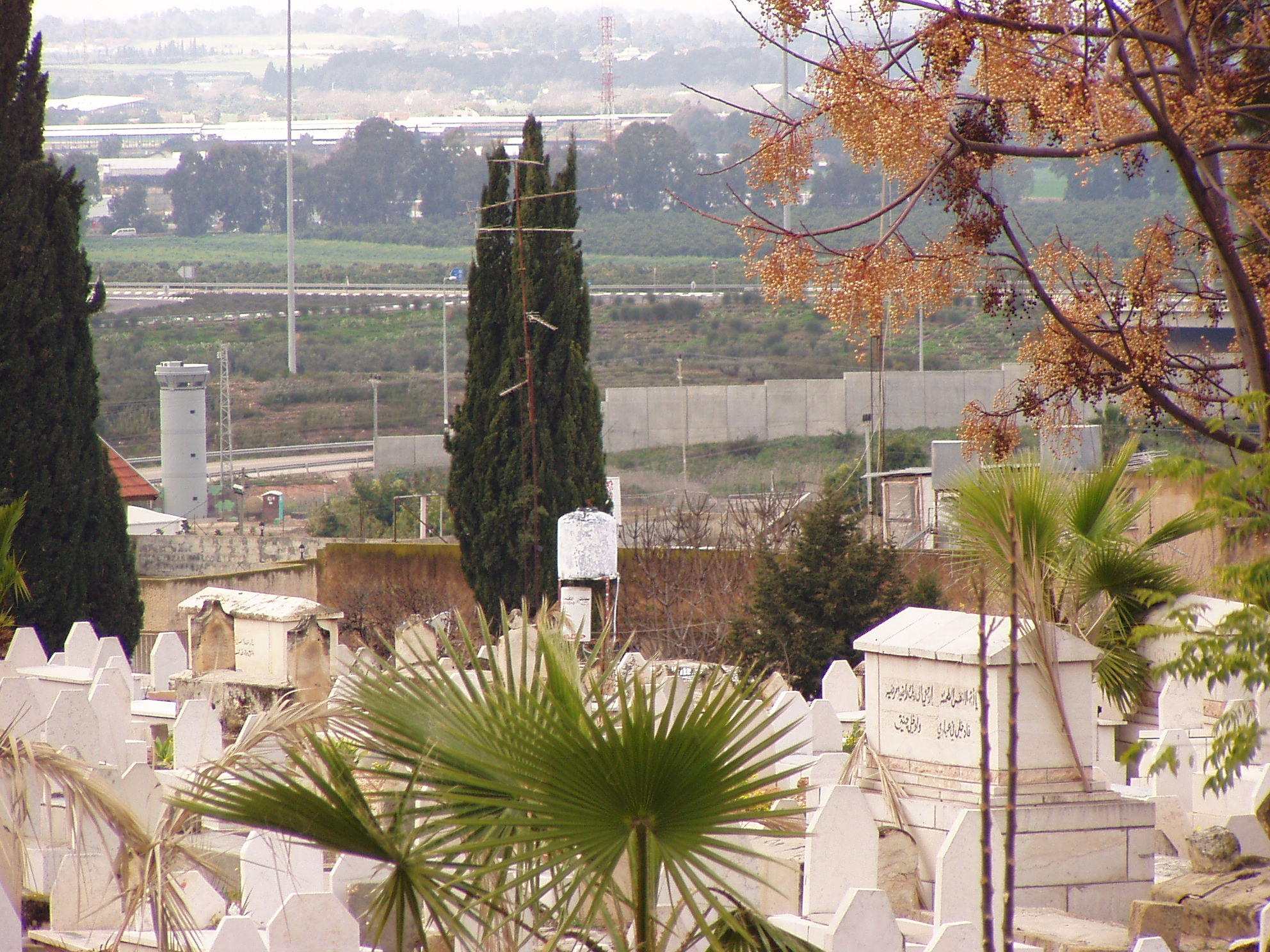

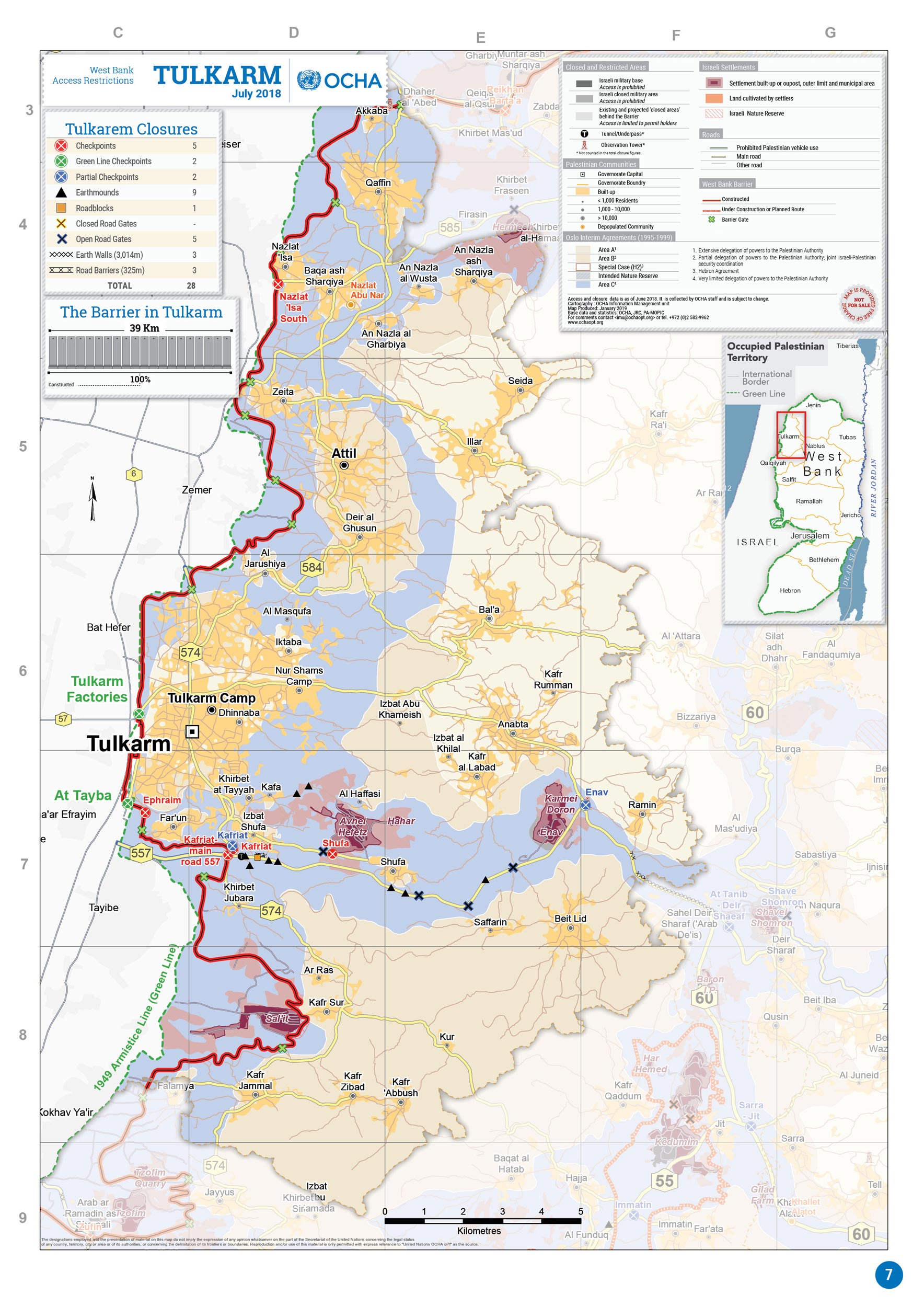
- 2018 United Nations map of the area, showing the Israeli occupation arrangements in the governorate
- Interactive map of Tulkarm Governorate
- Country: Palestine

Area
  - Total: 239 km^{2} (92 sq mi)

Population (2017)
  - Total: 158,213
- This figure excludes the Israeli West Bank Settlements
- ISO 3166 code: PS-TKM

The Tulkarm Governorate (Arabic: محافظة طولكرم, romanized: Muḥāfaẓat Ṭūlkarm) is an administrative district and one of the 16 Governorates of Palestine, located in the north-western West Bank. The governorate's land area is 268 square kilometres. According to the Palestinian Central Bureau of Statistics, the governorate had a population of 172,800 inhabitants. The muhafaza or district capital is the city of Tulkarm.

== History ==
During the Ottoman period, the region later forming the Tulkarm Governorate belonged to Jabal Nablus. Like other parts of Nablus' peripheral hinterland, it followed the provincial center through a closely knit web of economic, social and political relations between Nablus’ urban notables and the city’s surroundings. Beshara Doumani has shown how, with the help of rural trading partners, urban notables established trading monopolies that transformed Jabal Nablus’ autarkic economy into an export-driven market, shipping vast quantities of cash crops and finished goods to off-shore markets. Increasing demand for these commodities in the Ottoman Empire’s urban centers and in Europe spurred the demographic growth and settlement expansion in the lowlands surrounding Jabal Nablus.

In the 1860s, as part of the Ottoman Tanzimat, the area of Wadi al-Sha‘ir (Nahal Shechem) was incorporated into the Bani Ṣa‘b nahiya. Then, in the 1870s and 1880s, Bani Ṣa‘b was elevated into the level of a subdistrict with its administrator (kaykmakam) and municipal council.

== Localities ==
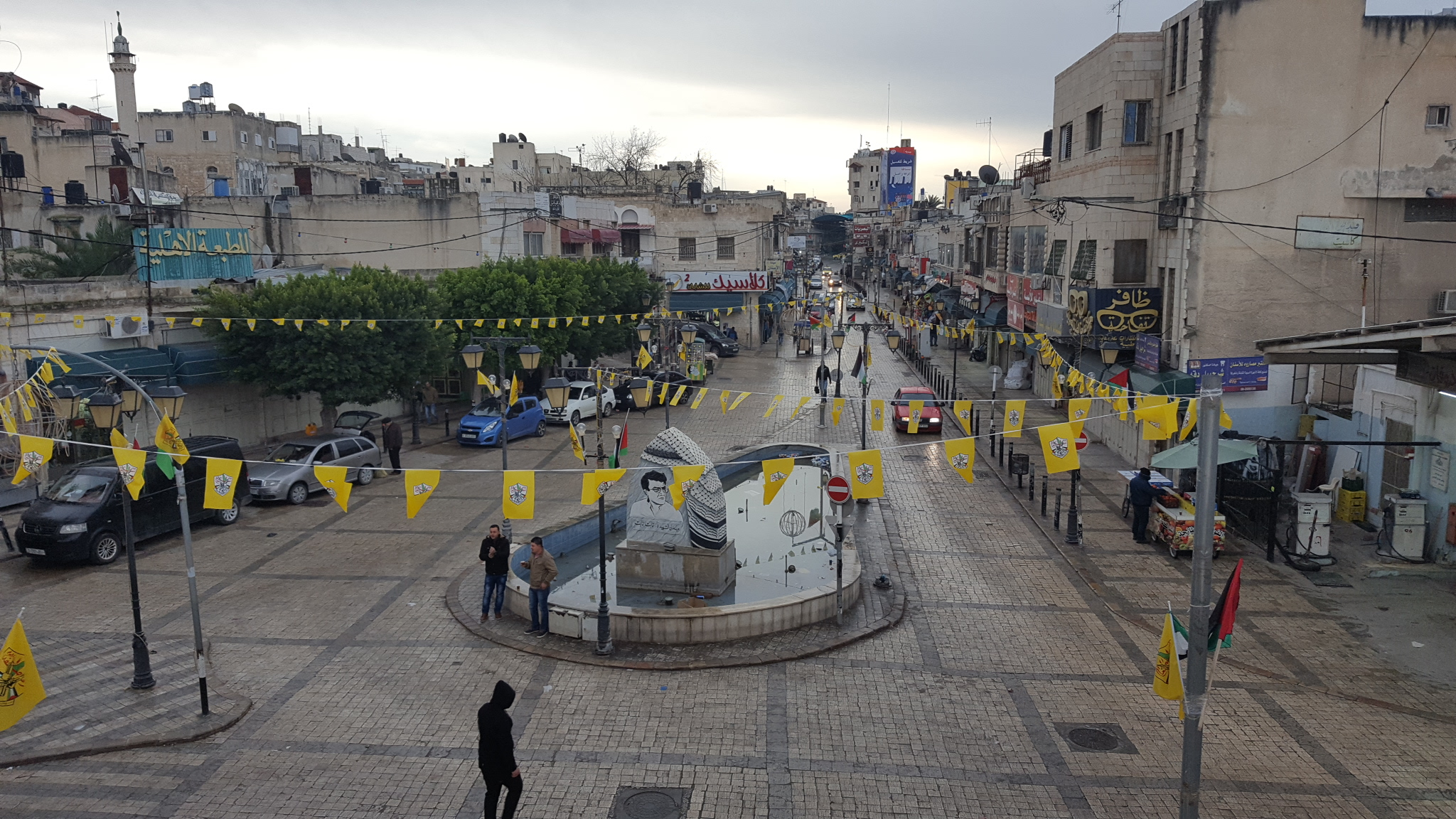
Tulkarm downtown in winter.

The Tulkarm Governorate has 51 localities and two refugee camps (Tulkarm Camp and Nur Shams Camp). The towns and cities mentioned below have populations of over 1,000.

=== Municipalities ===
- Anabta
- Attil
- Bal'a
- Baqa ash-Sharqiyya
- Beit Lid
- Deir al-Ghusun
- Qaffin
- Tulkarm

=== Villages ===
Town
Far'un - فرعون
Iktaba - إكتابا
'Illar- عِلار
Izbat Shufa - عزبة شوفة
Al-Jarushiya - الجاروشية
Kafr Abbush - كفر عبّوش
Kafr Jammal - كفر جمّال
Kafr al-Labad - كفراللبد
Kafr Rumman - كفر رمّان
Kafr Sur - كفر صور
Kafr Zibad - كفر زيباد
Khureish - خربة خريش
Kur - كور
an-Nazla al-Gharbiya - النزلة الغربية
an-Nazla ash-Sharqiya - النزلة الشرقية
an-Nazla al-Wusta - النزلة الوسطى
Nazlat Abu Nar - نزلة ابو نار
Nazlat 'Isa - نزلة عيسى
Raml Zeita - رمل زيتا/قزازة
Ramin - رامين
Al-Ras - الرأس
Saffarin - سفّارين
Seida - صيدا
Shufta - شوفة
Zeita - زيتا

== See also ==
- Palestinian National Authority
- Palestinian territories
- State of Palestine
