= Hourani =

Hourani also written Hawrani, Horani, Horany, Haurani, Howrani and Hurani (in Arabic حوراني) is a common Levantine Arabic surname.

Notable people with the surname include:

== Hourani ==
- Ahmed Al-Hourani (born 1991), Jordanian football player
- Albert Hourani (1915–1993), British historian of Lebanese descent
- Dominique Hourani (born 1985), Lebanese recording artist, actress, beauty queen, and former model
- Eid Hourany (1940–2008), Lebanese nuclear physicist
- Farid Hourani (1928–2014), Lebanese-American physician and author
- George Hourani (1913–1984), British philosopher, historian, and classicist of Lebanese descent
- Hasan Hourani (1974–2003), Palestinian artist
- Rad Hourani (born 1982), Canadian French designer, photographer and artist
- Youssef Hourany (1931–2019), Lebanese writer, archeologist and historian

== Hawrani ==
- Akram al-Hawrani (1912–1996), Syrian politician
