= Jaffa riots (April 1936) =

Violent anti-Jewish riots perpetrated by Arabs in Mandatory Palestine

1936 Jaffa riots
- Part of the 1936–1939 Arab revolt in Palestine
- Location: 32°03′08″N 34°45′11″E; Jaffa, Mandatory Palestine
- Date: 19–21 April 1936
- Attack type: Riot
- Deaths: 14 Jews; 2 Arabs
- Perpetrator: Palestinian Arabs

In the context of mass Jewish immigration to Mandatory Palestine, violent attacks against British colonial installations and Jews of the Yishuv broke out in Jaffa on 19 April 1936. These attacks are often described as the start of the 1936–1939 Arab revolt in Palestine. A total of 14 Jews and 2 Arabs were killed during the riots, and the conflict led to the British destruction of over one hundred of buildings in the Old City of Jaffa—about a fifth of the Old City of Jaffa—creating internally displaced Palestinian Arab refugees.

== Background ==
The British Mandatory authorities and other contemporary sources dated the 1936–1939 Arab revolt in Palestine to 15 April, the date of the Anabta shooting in which Arab followers of Izz ad-Din al-Qassam set up a roadblock on the Nablus to Tulkarm road, stopping about 20 vehicles to demand cash and weapons; separating out 3 Jews from other occupants of the vehicles. The Arabs then shot the 3 Jewish men; only 1 survived. The two killed Jewish drivers were Israel (or Yisrael) Khazan, who was killed instantly, and Zvi Dannenberg, who died five days later. The following day members of Irgun shot and killed two Arab workers sleeping in a hut near Petah Tikva. On 17 April, the funeral for Khazan was held in Tel Aviv, attracting a crowd of thousands, some of whom beat Arab passersby and vandalized property.

== Riots ==
On 19 April, rumors spread in the Arab community that "many Arabs had been killed by Jews", and Arabs began to attack Jews in the streets of Jaffa. An Arab mob marched on the Jewish-owned Anglo-Palestine Bank. Members of the Palestine Police Force guarding the bank defended themselves by firing into the mob, killing two of the rioters. This incited the mob to "fury" and Jews began to be killed in the streets.

Manuela Williams describes this as the "peak" event in a series of violent attacks leading up to the declaration of a general strike by the Arab Higher Committee.

According to Aryeh Avneri, citing the History of the Haganah, the rioting broke out first among the migrant Haurani dockworkers in Jaffa Port. A mob of Arab men rampaged through the mixed Muslim, Christian and Jewish streets of Jaffa, killing and beating Jews and wrecking Jewish homes and businesses.

11 people were reported dead in the first day's rioting. These included 2 Arabs "shot by British police in self-defense," and 9 Jews, with dozens of others wounded, "most of the Jewish injured bore knife wounds. The rioting went on for a total of 3 days, it was finally suppressed by British security forces.

== Impact ==
=== Refugees ===
The British destruction of over one hundred of buildings in the Old City of Jaffa—about a fifth of the Old City of Jaffa—created internally displaced Palestinian Arab refugees.

The continuing threat of violence combined with the destruction of Jewish property and arson attacks that destroyed Jewish homes forced 12,000 Jews to flee Jaffa as refugees. 9,500 were housed by the Tel Aviv municipality, imposing a heavy financial burden on the city. Seventy-five temporary shelters were created in schools, synagogues, government and industrial buildings. During May and June the Haganah was able to stabilize the security situation to the point where about 4,000 of the refugees were able to return to their homes. Others found housing privately, so that by July only 4,800 remained in public refugee camps; 3,200 of these were utterly destitute. By November, Jewish charities had placed even the destitute refugees in housing, and the refugee camps were closed.

According to Tamir Goren, the number of Arab refugees is difficult to estimate. Unlike the Jewish refugees, for whom there is detailed data compiled and reported by support organizations, Arabs had no such organizations and "the Arabic press refrained from giving numbers, apparently for fear of demoralization."

=== Annexation of Jaffa to Tel Aviv ===
One impact of the riot was the start of a political demand that the Jewish neighborhoods of Jaffa be separated from Jaffa and incorporated into Tel Aviv.

== Literary references ==
Chapter 11 of Leon Uris's criticized and once bestselling 1984 novel, The Haj, is entitled Jaffa – April 19, 1936. In The Blood of His Servants, Malcolm MacPherson writes of 19 April as the day when the Arab revolt on Palestine began, and a "campaign of armed attacks" started. In his 1968 work, Days of Fire, Shmuel Katz, a senior member of the Irgun, wrote of arriving in Tel Aviv from Jerusalem on 19 April to find the town in turmoil with reports of stabbing in nearby Jaffa.

== See also ==
- 1938 Tiberias massacre
- 1921 Jaffa riots
