= Hisham Zayn Al-Din =

Lebanese researcher, scholar and playwright

- Born: March 15, 1968 (age 58)
- Education: St. Petersburg State University, Belarus State University, Lebanese University.
- Occupations: Professor, writer, researcher, theater director
- Awards: Theater Author award at the Theater Week Festival in Oman for his theatrical text "The Late Night's Delirium"

Hisham Zayn Al-Din (or: zeineddine) (Arabic:هشام زين الدين) is a researcher, scholar, director and playwright from Lebanon. Founder of the Lebanese Educational Theater Company. He won the Theater Writing Award at the Theater Week Festival in Oman for his theatrical text "The Late Night's Delirium".

== Biography ==
Hisham Shamil Zayn Al-Din was born on March 15, 1968, in the village of Batma (Lebanon's Chouf region). He studied at Kamal Jumblatt State High School, then completed his higher education at the Lebanese University, the Belarusian Academy of Fine Arts (1988–1992) and the St. Petersburg State Academy of Dramatic Arts (1996) and received a State Doctorate in Performing Arts, after receiving a master's degree in dramatic directing.

== Cultural and artistic activity ==
Zayn Al-Din is a theater director and author at the Institute of Fine Arts and a member of the research team at the Higher Institute of Doctoral Studies at the Lebanese University, he was also the head of the Department of Theatrical Education at the Faculty of Education at the Lebanese University between 2002 and 2004. He is the first Lebanese experience in the context of "Curriculum Theater" in a group of public and private schools, especially with the schools of Sidon and the neighboring areas.

He has published numerous articles and researches in Lebanese and Arab newspapers, magazines and periodicals. He has contributed to several competitive festivals in Lebanon and the Arab world. He chaired the Theater Curriculum Committee at the Center for Educational Research and Development. He was a member of the Board of Trustees of the Foundation for Educational Consultancy and Clinic in Lebanon, and a member of the Advisory Committee of the Al-Hadatha journal. He was editor-in-chief of the Educational Journal of Lebanon between 2004 and 2008 and was appointed as a fine arts specialist at the Educational Center for Research and Development from 2004 to 2008.

He directed a series of documentaries for the Ministry of Culture and Television of Lebanon, the Lebanese Broadcasting Corporation (LBC) he was also a consultant for the specialized station for education and literacy between 2005 and 2006. He has written numerous articles and researches on his work.

== Works ==
Zayn Al-Din has many theatrical works, books, research papers and writings, including:

=== Theater ===
- Everyone's House (original title: Beit El Kel) – Educational play – 2001 (directed and written)
- Today Young and Tomorrow Old (original title: El Youm Zgar w Bukra Kbar) – Educational play – 2003 (directed and written)
- The Minister’s Visit (original title: Zyaret Said Al-Wazir) – performed at the Theatre of Babel, Beirut – 2011 (written and directed)
- Coffee Ground (original title: Teffil El Qahwa) – 2016 – (monodrama written and directed by Zain al-Din based on the story of Haitham al-Tawili)
- General Lesson (original title: Dars Umome) – 2018
- Ababid – 2019 (written and directed)

=== Books ===
- The Minister's Visit (original title: Zyaret Said Al-Wazir) – 2007
- Theatrical Education: Drama as Means to Build a Human (Human Building) – 2008
- Textbook at the Educational Center for Research and Development (Co-author)
- Late Night Delirium
