= Farhan Saleh =

Farhan Saleh may refer to:

- Farhan Farhan, Bahraini swimmer.
- Farhan Saleh (writer), writer, researcher and militant from Lebanon.

== See also ==
- Saleh Farhan, Bahraini footballer
