= Yaroun =

Village in Nabatieh Governorate of Lebanon

Yaroun يارون
- Municipality
- Location within Lebanon
- Coordinates: 33°04′50″N 35°25′21″E
- Grid position: 189/276 PAL
- Country: Lebanon
- Governorate: Nabatieh Governorate
- District: Bint Jbeil District
- Highest elevation: 750 m (2,460 ft)
- Lowest elevation: 700 m (2,300 ft)
- Time zone: UTC+2 (EET)
  - Summer (DST): UTC+3 (EEST)
- Dialing code: +961

Yaroun (also spelled Yarun; Arabic: يارون, romanized: Yārūn) is a depopulated and destroyed municipality located in the Caza of Bint Jbeil in the Nabatieh Governorate in Lebanon.

== Geography ==
Yaroun sits on a hill 750–900 meters above sea level. The main agricultural products of Yaroun are olives, wheat, and tobacco.

Yaroun lies on the Israeli–Lebanese border. It overlooks Yir'on and Avivim in Israel.

== History ==
=== Antiquity ===
It has been suggested that Yaroun is the biblical town of Iron/Jiron, mentioned in Joshua 19:38 as a village belonging to the Tribe of Naphtali.

=== Ottoman period ===
In 1596, it was named as a village, يارون النصارى (Yarun an-Nasara meaning “Yarun of the Christians”) in the Ottoman nahiya (subdistrict) of Tibnin under the liwa' (district) of Safad, with a population of 37 Muslim households and 20 Muslim bachelors, and 39 Christian households and 11 Christian bachelors. The villagers paid taxes on a number of crops, such as wheat, barley, olive trees, vineyards, fruit trees, goats and beehives, in addition to "occasional revenues"; a total of 7,247 akçe.

In 1674, a western traveler, father Michel Naud or Nau (fr:Michel Nau), saw remains of a monastery and church near by, with fragments from many columns.

In 1781 Nasif al-Nassar was killed here by Jazzar Pasha when their two armies met.

In 1838, Edward Robinson noted it as "a large village". Ernest Renan visited Yaroun during his mission to Lebanon and described what he found in his book Mission de Phénicie (1865-1874). He found many antiquities at Yaroun.

On 31 December 1863, Louis Félicien de Saulcy, the French orientalist and archaeologist left Jish and arrived in Yaroun, and despite the heavy rain on that day, he examined the ruins of a temple, with a huge sarcophagi and sepulchral excavations cut into the rock, and a square well few meters deep, deducing that Yaroun was the Biblical town of Iaraoun, one of the cities of the Naphtali tribe mentioned in the Book of Joshua (xiv. 38).

According to Victor Guérin, who visited in 1870, the town had 300 Greek Orthodox Christians and 200 Shia Muslims. He described the local church, devoted to St. George ("Mar Jiris") as simple and modest, and pointed out a Greek inscription and a decoration of a date tree in the local mosque, which, according to the inscription, were once part of a nearby temple.

In 1881, the PEF's Survey of Western Palestine (SWP) described it: “A stone village, containing about 200 Metawileh and 200 Christians; a Christian chapel in the village. The village is situated on the edge of a plain, with vineyards and arable land; to the west rises a basalt-top called el Burj, dotted with cisterns, and said to be the site of an ancient castle."

SWP also found here the remains of an ancient Church, with Greek inscriptions.

=== Modern period ===
By the 1945 statistics the population was counted with Saliha and Maroun al-Ras, to a total of 1070 Muslims, with 11,735 dunams of land, according to an official land and population survey. Of this, 7,401 dunams were allocated to cereals, 422 dunams were irrigated or used for orchards, while 58 dunams were built-up (urban) area.

In the 1970s, a small group of immigrants from Yaroun, fleeing the Lebanese Civil War, settled in Bell, California. They founded a Lebanese American community that has since grown to about 2,000 members.

In July 2006, Yaroun, like many other villages along Lebanon's southern border, were caught by the 2006 Lebanon War between Hezbollah and the Israeli Defense Forces. On 23 July, five civilians were killed in an Israeli strike in Yaroun; victims were aged between 6 months and 75 years old.

In October 2023 and the months succeeding it, Yaroun was caught in the crossfire of another conflict between Israel and Hezbollah. As a result, Yaroun was subjected to significant Israeli airstrikes and shelling, which resulted in the destruction of much of the village and total displacement of its residents.

In October 2024, Israel launched a ground incursion into the village and detonated the Imam Ali Ibn Abi Talib Mosque, an incident that was recorded and posted on various social media channels. Later on, IDF released drone footage of the mostly ravaged village. As of 2025, the village lays in ruins, with most of its infrastructure completely destroyed. In May 2026 Israeli forces began demolishing the remaining homes, shops and landmarks in the town, including a monastery and a nuns school. By August 2026 about 900 houses had been demolished by the Israelis, while 20 remained. Agricultural cultivation areas had been destroyed by fires, attributed by local firefighters to drones dropping incendiary charges.

== Demographics ==
In 2009, there were 365 members of the Saint-Georges parish of the Melkite Church in the village.

As of 2010, the village had a year-round population of around 2,000 (pre-war) though this number rose to about 4,000 in the summer months.

In 2014 Muslims made up 75.59% and Christians made up 24.16% of registered voters in Yaroun. 74.89% of the voters were Shiite Muslims and 21.31% were Greek Catholics.

== Social life ==
While the majority of Yarounis visit Yaroun for the summer, most of Yaroun natives reside outside of Lebanon, in Australia, USA, Argentina, Brazil, Colombia, Panama, Venezuela, and South Africa.

== Notable persons ==
- Eid Hourany (1940 – 2008), French and Lebanese nuclear physicist
- Youssef Hourany (1931 – 2019), Lebanese writer, archeologist and historian
- Dominique Hourani (born 1985), Lebanese recording artist, actress, and former model
- Mohamad Kdouh (born 1997), Lebanese footballer

== Bibliography ==
- Claude Assaf, "Pourquoi Aïta el-Chaab, Yaroun et Meïs el-Jabal sont parmi les villages les plus ciblés au Liban-Sud par Israël", L'Orient-Le Jour, 28 décembre 2023.
- Blanford, Nicholas (2011). Warriors of God: Inside Hezbollah's Thirty-Year Struggle Against Israel. Random House Publishing Group. ISBN 9780679605164.
- Conder, C.R.; Kitchener, H.H. (1881). The Survey of Western Palestine: Memoirs of the Topography, Orography, Hydrography, and Archaeology. Vol. 1. London: Committee of the Palestine Exploration Fund.
- Department of Statistics (1945). Village Statistics, April, 1945. Government of Palestine.
- Guérin, V. (1880). Description Géographique Historique et Archéologique de la Palestine (in French). Vol. 3: Galilee, pt. 2. Paris: L'Imprimerie Nationale.
- Hadawi, S. (1970). "Village Statistics of 1945: A Classification of Land and Area ownership in Palestine". Palestine Liberation Organization Research Centre.
- HRW (2007). Why They Died: Civilian Casualties in Lebanon During the 2006 War. Human Rights Watch.
- Hütteroth, W.-D.; Abdulfattah, K. (1977). Historical Geography of Palestine, Transjordan and Southern Syria in the Late 16th Century. Erlanger Geographische Arbeiten, Sonderband 5. Erlangen, Germany: Vorstand der Fränkischen Geographischen Gesellschaft. ISBN 3-920405-41-2.
- Palmer, E.H. (1881). The Survey of Western Palestine: Arabic and English Name Lists Collected During the Survey by Lieutenants Conder and Kitchener, R. E. Transliterated and Explained by E.H. Palmer. Committee of the Palestine Exploration Fund.
- Rhode, H. (1979). Administration and Population of the Sancak of Safed in the Sixteenth Century. Columbia University. Archived from the original on 2020-03-01.
- Renan, E. (1864). Mission de Phénicie (in French). Paris: Imprimerie impériale.
- Robinson, E.; Smith, E. (1841). Biblical Researches in Palestine, Mount Sinai and Arabia Petraea: A Journal of Travels in the year 1838. Vol. 3. Boston: Crocker & Brewster.
