= Flag of Hezbollah =

- Proportion: 2∶3
- Design: A yellow field emblazoned with the logo of Hezbollah in green and Arabic text in red or green.

The flag of the Shi'a political and military organization Hezbollah depicts a stylized representation of the Arabic words حزب الله (Ḥizbullāh, meaning 'Party of God') in Kufic script. Written near the first letter of the word Allah, there is a hand that reaches up to grasp a stylized assault rifle. The flag incorporates several other symbols, namely a globe, a book, a sword, and a seven-leafed branch. The text above the logo reads فإن حزب الله هم الغالبون (fa-inna ḥizba llāhi humu l-gālibūna) and means "Then surely the party of God are they that shall be triumphant" (Quran 5:56), which is a reference to the name of the party. Underneath the logo are the words المقاومة الإسلامية في لبنان (al-muqāwamah al-islāmīyah fī lubnān), meaning "The Islamic Resistance in Lebanon".

== Symbolism ==
=== Colours ===
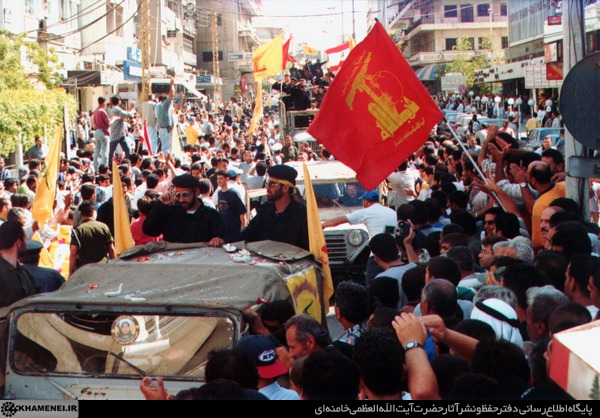
A parade for Hezbollah in 2000, showing non-standard colors that were once more common

Yellow is the predominant colour on the flag and forms the basis for its field. Whilst there is no reason given for this choice of colour, journalist Tim Marshall has theorised that it may have been chosen to signify Hezbollah's willingness to fight for the sake of Allah and the Shi'a faith.

The reasoning behind the usage of the colour green in the flag is more obvious. Green in Islamic symbolism is inextricably linked to the Islamic prophet Muhammad and the ahlulbayt, the colour is mentioned numerous times within the Quran. As a traditionally Islamic colour, the usage of green on the flag is an overtly political and explicitly religious statement.

Sometimes the text on the flag appears in red lettering. The usage of red in this case is used to symbolise the blood shed by those who fell for the cause of the organization.

=== Imagery ===
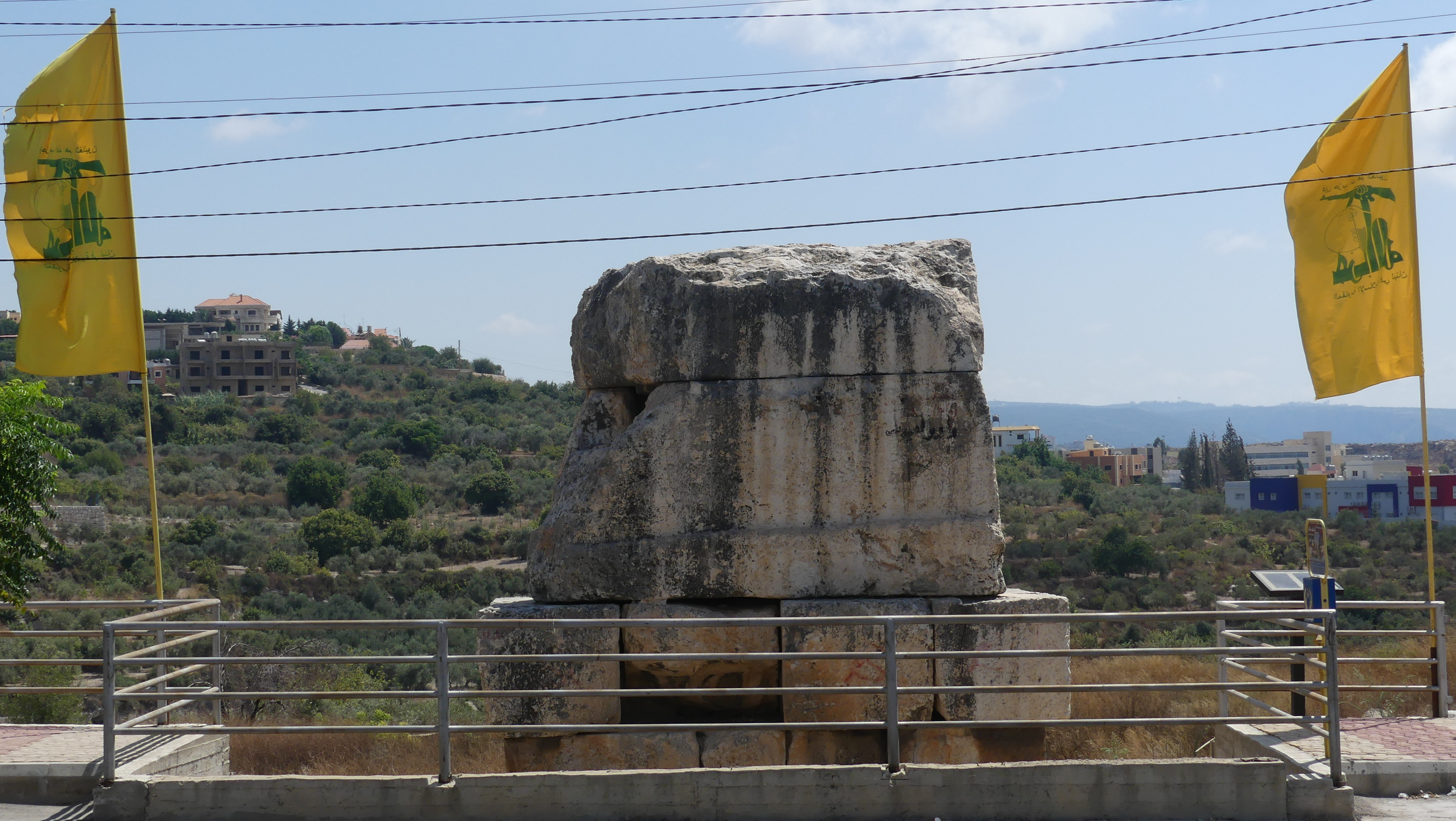
Vertical versions of the flag flying at the Tomb of Hiram

The symbolism of the fist grasping an assault rifle, which combines elements of the H&K G3 battle rifle and the AK-47, is twofold. The rifle is simultaneously symbolic of the party's left-wing ideological roots, sharing in the iconography of similar armed socialist movements. The rifle also represents Hezbollah's belief in an armed struggle against oppressive forces. Opponents of Hezbollah interpret the inclusion of the rifle on the flag as proof that the group's aims are intrinsically tied with militant and violent action.

A globe can also be found depicted on the flag, symbolizing Hezbollah's global activities. Also depicted are a seven-leafed branch and a Quran, further highlighting the group's ties to Islam.

=== Text ===
The central text on the flag displays the organisation's name; حزب الله (ḥizbu-llāh) which translates to "Party of Allah". The 'Alif' (first letter in the word Allah on the flag) extends upwards to form the fist which clenches the assault rifle.

Above the central text is found an Islamic quote (Quran 5:56) فإن حزب الله هم الغالبون . This translates to "Then surely the party of Allah are they that shall be triumphant" in reference to the party itself.

The text below the central text states المقاومة الإسلامية في لبنان which translates to "The Islamic Resistance in Lebanon", which serves to promote the image of the group's cause as legitimate and righteous.

== History ==
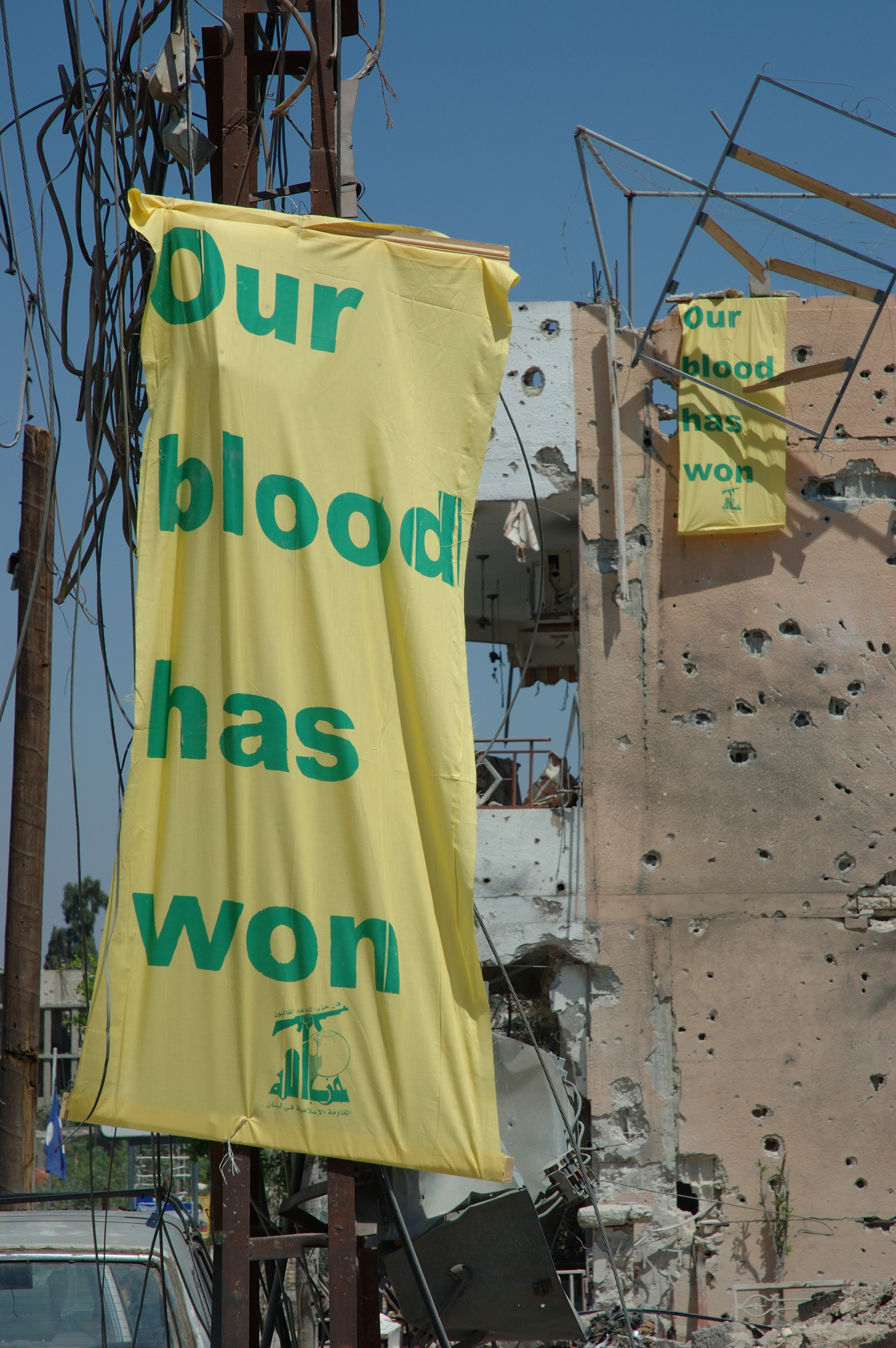
Hezbollah flag banners with the caption "Our blood has won" near Et Taibeh, South Lebanon, referring to the 2006 Lebanon War

Initially, Hezbollah operated under the flag of Iran, as this was viewed by supporters as the flag of Islam, specifically of the Shia sect. The flag of Hezbollah first saw usage in the late 1980s and early 1990s, often being displayed alongside the Iranian flag.

Changes made to the flag of Hezbollah reflect the changing ideology of the party in the late 1990s and early 2000s. The two pillars of Hezbollah's ideology in the 1990s focused on an armed struggle against Israel twinned with the aim of establishing an Islamic republic in Lebanon. Referencing the latter goal, the text on the flag below the logo translated to "The Islamic Revolution in Lebanon" before 2001. Yet this changed in 2001 following the reversal of a policy of hostility towards Lebanon. The text was instead changed to "The Islamic Resistance in Lebanon" in order to more strongly emphasize Hezbollah's opposition towards Israel.

The flag has remained unchanged since the early 2000s and has grown to become a globally recognised symbol of Hezbollah, yet also one representative of Islamic extremism.

== Use ==
Predominantly the flag of Hezbollah is flown by supporters and fighters of the organisation throughout the Middle East, specifically within Lebanon. The flag has recently seen extensive use by Hezbollah supporters fighting in the Syrian Civil War. Internationally, the flag can be found flying at Islamic demonstrations. Notably the flag is often seen during pro-Palestinian protests, such as those held during Al-Quds day.

Hezbollah's flag also has a more symbolic use. The flag can often be seen draped over the coffins of deceased members of the organization, attempting to evoke a sense of martyrdom for the cause.

== Controversy ==
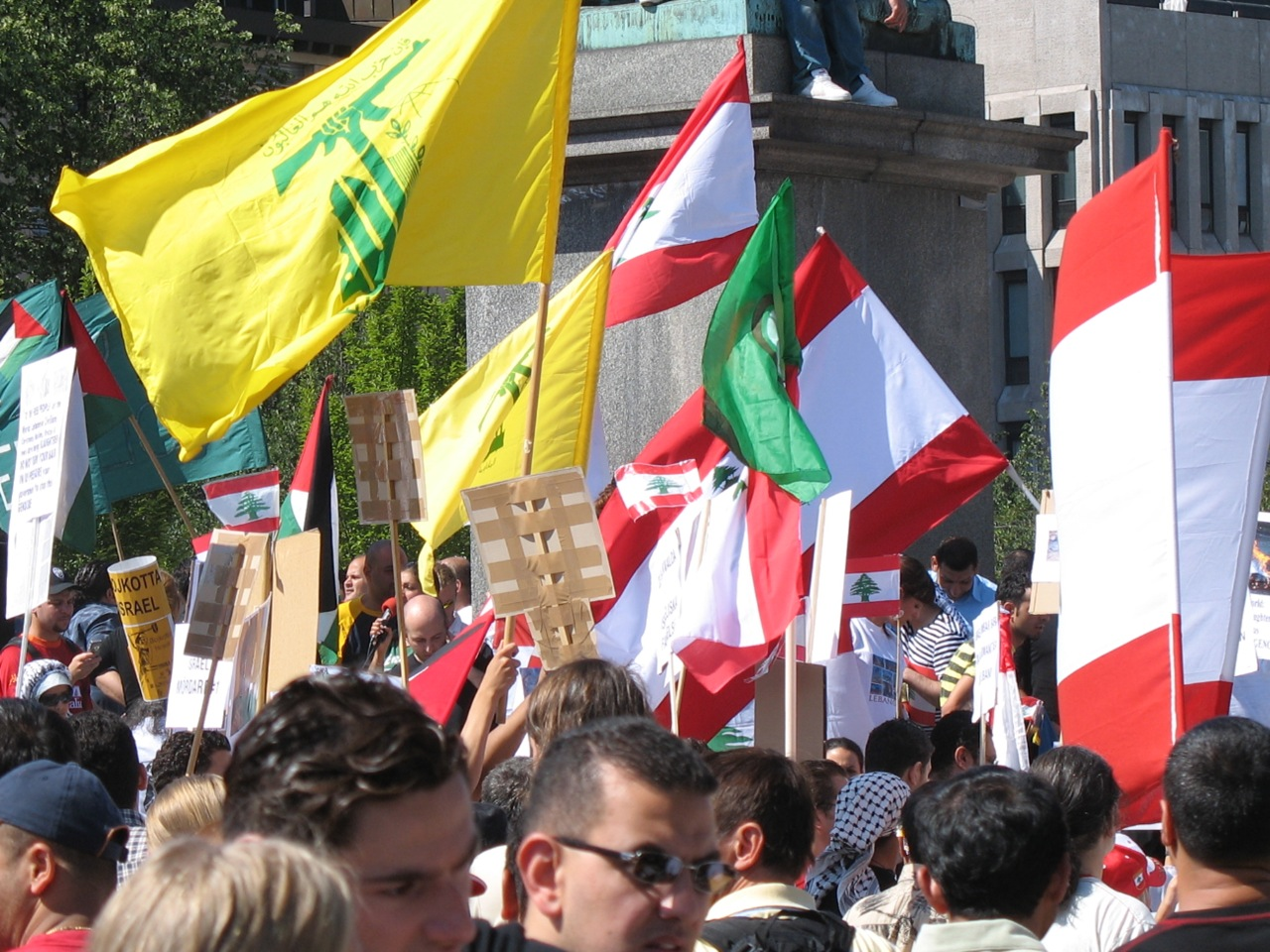
Hezbollah flags waving with Lebanese, Palestinian, and Amal Movement flags at a demonstration during the 2006 war, Stockholm, Sweden

The flag of Hezbollah has often caused controversy within some western countries. Both the military and political wings of Hezbollah have been banned in a number of countries.

In the United Kingdom, only the military wing of Hezbollah was listed as a proscribed organisation by the Home Office in 2008 whilst the political wing remained unbanned. This created a legal loophole which allowed supporters to fly the flag at demonstrations and protests throughout Britain as the flag was an official symbol of both wings. The flag could be found at protests such as at the annual Al-Quds day demonstrations and was deemed offensive by a number of groups, especially Britain's Jewish community. In March 2019, the decision was made by Home Secretary Sajid Javid to include Hezbollah's political wing on the list of proscribed terrorist organisations, outlawing the flying of the flag in Britain.

The flag is also flown by Hezbollah supporters in the United States, despite the fact that the entire group is listed as a terrorist organization. One example was during demonstrations in New York City in April 2024 during the ongoing protests against the Gaza war. The First Amendment to the United States Constitution guarantees freedom of speech, limiting the government's authority to suppress it.

== See also ==
- Flag of Lebanon
- Black Standard
- Sarkha
- Flag of Hamas
