= Elham Kallab =

Lebanese academic

- Born: 1944 (age 81–82); Amsheet, Lebanon
- Education: Lebanese University; Paris-Sorbonne University
- Occupations: Academic; researcher; professor; writer
- Title: President of the Academic University College for Non-Violence and Human Rights (AUNOHR)
- Relatives: Dr. Hisham Basat (husband)
- Awards: The National Order of the Cedar

Elham Kallab (Arabic: إلهام كلاب البساط) is a Lebanese academic and researcher born in 1944. She is president of the Graduate Women International, member of the National Commission for Lebanese Women and the Chairperson of the Youth and Education Committee. She is also a professor of East-West Relations at the Institute of Muslim-Christian Studies at Saint Joseph University. She was awarded the National Order of the Cedar medal with the Rank of Knight.

== Life and career ==
=== Early life ===
Elham Rafiq Abi Hanna Kallab was born in Amsheet in 1944, and her mother is Josephine Nakhla Zakhiya. She completed her high school classes at the Monastery of the Sisters of the Sacred Hearts in Achrafieh. She earned her undergraduate degree at the Faculty of Arts of Lebanese University and Ph.D. in Art History and Archaeology from Paris-Sorbonne University in 1977.

In 1974, she married Dr. Hisham Bissat the day before the Lebanese Civil War. They have two children: Rana, who majors in visual arts, and Jadd, who majors in computer and communication engineering.

=== Career ===
Kallab contributed to the cultural mobility Beirut was experiencing in the 1960s. Upon her return from Paris, she was appointed professor at the Institute of Fine Arts at the Lebanese University and taught the history of architecture, heritage engineering and arts and aesthetics from 1978 and until her retirement. She also taught at several other universities in Lebanon.

Kallab is the president of several community associations, formerly the President of the Lebanese Cultural Dialogue Circle, and Assistant Director at the United Nations Educational, Scientific and Cultural Organization (UNESCO) from 2000 to 2005. She became president of the Academic University College for Non-Violence and Human Rights (AUNOHR) in 2019.

== Works ==
She has numerous research, studies and publications and has made active contributions to several Lebanese periodicals, including being a consultant to a non-academic journal, Al Hadatha. She is also the author and education coordinator of national textbooks at the Center for Educational Research and Development. These works include:

- She Cooks, He Reads: The Image of Women in School Books in Lebanon – 1983
- Selections of the Book Journey to the East by Alphonse de Lamartine (translation) – 2006
- Le décor animalier dans l'art islamique de l'époque Umayyae (thesis) – 1977

=== Research ===
- Social Violence and Women
- The Impact of War on Female Students’ Academic Performance
- Image of Women in the Media
- Women and Violence in Film
- Creativity and Freedom of Arab Women in Novels, Poetry and Visual Arts
- Relationship of Post-war Education to Social Violence
- Image of the Arab in American Cinema
- West and East in Amin Maalouf's novels
