= Hiram's Tomb =

Ancient sarcophagus in South Lebanon

Coordinates: 33°13′34″N 35°16′26″E

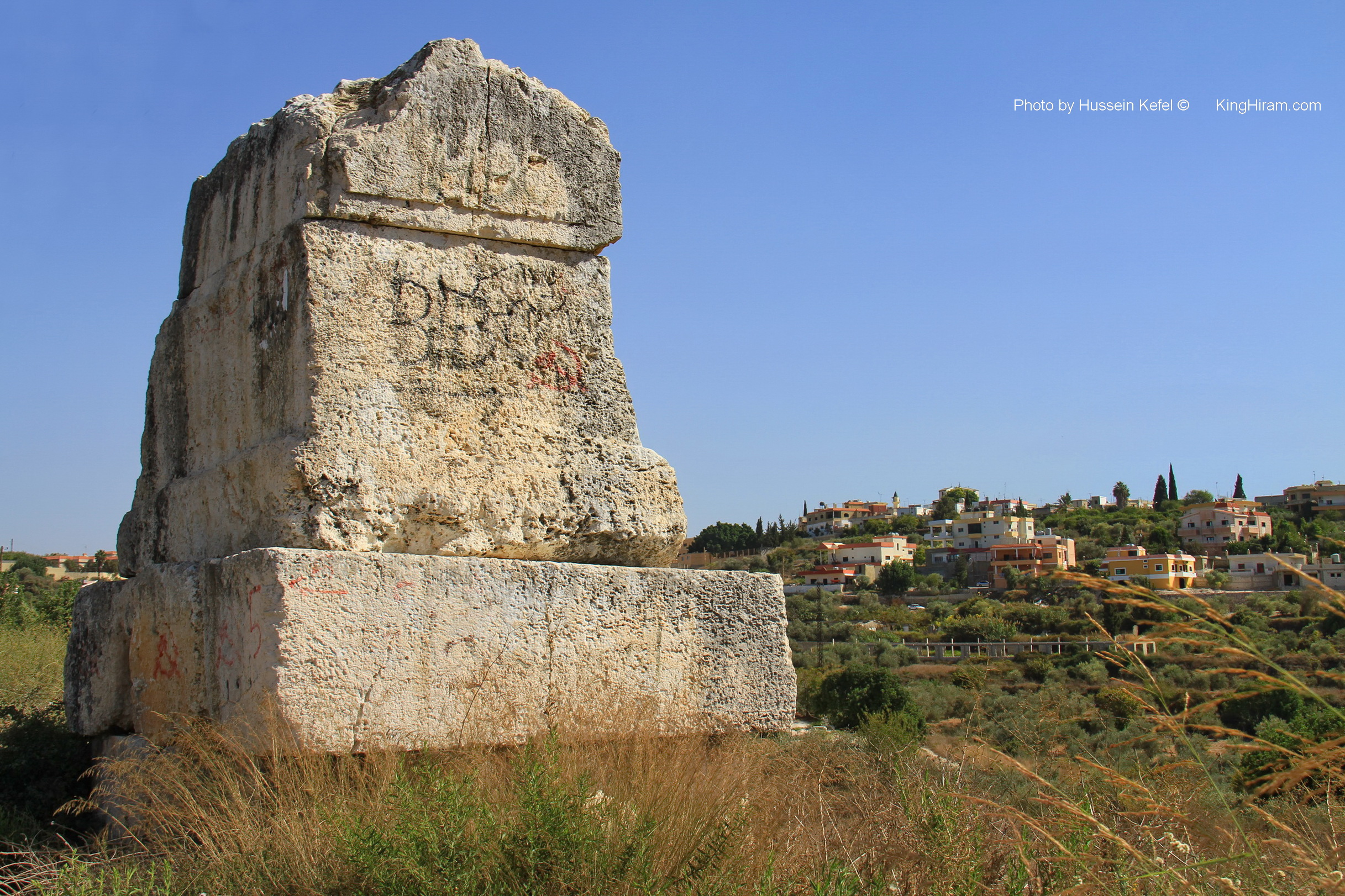
The tomb on the Tyre-Qana road in 2014

Hiram's Tomb (Arabic: ضريح حيرام, romanized: Darih Hiram, lit. 'Hiram's mausoleum' or Arabic: قبر حيرام, romanized: Qabr Hiram, lit. 'Hiram's grave') is a large limestone sarcophagus and pedestal located approximately 6 km (3.7 mi) southeast of Tyre, Lebanon, near the village of Hanaouay on the road to Qana.

Although traditionally attributed to Hiram I, it has been dated to the Persian period, 4–6 centuries after the supposed time of Hiram. It shows some similarity with other Persian tombs such as the Tomb of Cyrus and Gur-e-Dokhtar.

Louis Félicien de Saulcy, who visited the tomb shortly after Renan's excavations in 1860-1861, but published his work beforehand, wrote that "All this has only been half-excavated, and would require intelligent exploration, only after which the tomb of Hiram will say its last word." Renan responded by writing: "I don't believe Hiram's Tomb will ever say its last word, as it has no inscription. One day, people smarter than me will study it; but I doubt they will find anything other than what we found. The excavation that we made of this monument was complete."

== Authenticity of name ==
According to Edward Robinson in his Biblical Researches in Palestine, the first published mention of the proposed connection to Hiram was made by Vere Monro in his description of his 1833 journey to the region. Vere Monro described it as follows:

...the village of Anner... Annowy is a mile beyond. In the rocks between these two places are many tombs, cut to the form and size of coffins, and about the latter village the traces of antiquity are still more numerous. Hewn stones are scattered about near fragments of ancient walls, and the road passes over two wide steps of white marble, on each side of which is a solid square block of stone, that seems to have answered the purpose of a door-post. Half a mile beyond, close to the road, is a gigantic sarcophagus, called Abber Hiram; [The Tomb of Hiram] having a base fifteen feet long, ten high, and ten wide. The sarcophagus upon the top of this, cut from a single stone, is twelve feet long, six high, and eight wide, having a cover three feet thick, cut away round the edge, so as to fit close into the sarcophagus, the interior of which is seven feet long, and two and a half wide. It has been opened at one end; though whether Cambyses or John Hyrcanus made the incision, is not inscribed; but the known wealth of Hiram would render him after death a fit victim for plunder in the eyes of the great sepulchral thesaurophagi.

In his 1861 Mission de Phénicie, the French scholar Ernest Renan studied the monument. He began by explaining:

Many travelers have spoken of the so-called Hiram tomb. This name does not deserve to be discussed. We do not see a trace before 1833, and yet it is a remarkable monument, which must have attracted attention from the Middle Ages. If at that time this enormous tomb had been considered the tomb of Solomon's friend, there is no doubt that it would have been mentioned in Brocard or in any other description of Palestine.

Renan went on to explain his view that the naming of the tomb must have been the work of some French or English tourist of the first quarter of the 19th century, who had wanted to hear the name of the famous Biblical personality, and he described the process of myth-making around Biblical sites in the region, particularly in Jerusalem.

== Description ==
The structure is 4 meters long by 3 meters wide, with an overall height of 7 meters including the 2 meter high sarcophagus.

== Renan's excavations ==
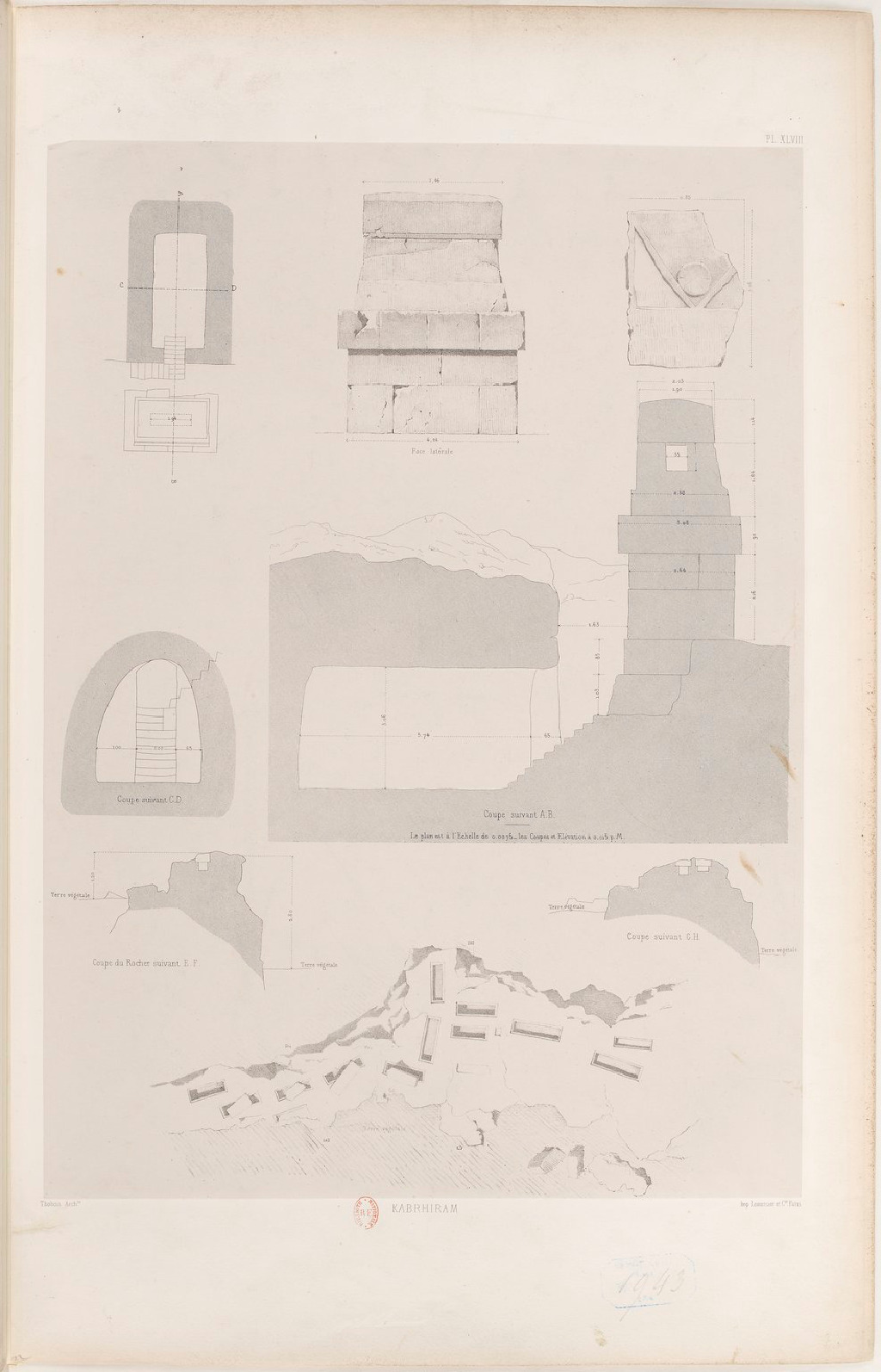
Detailed excavations drawings by Renan, 1864

During Renan's excavations in 1860-61, a staircase was found to be carved out of the rock leading into a large empty cavern adjacent to the structure and its foundations. The arrangement of the foundations suggested that the staircase and cavern pre-dated tomb, which appeared to have been built on top. Concrete appears to have been poured into another cavern directly underneath, to create foundations for the monument.

== Gallery ==
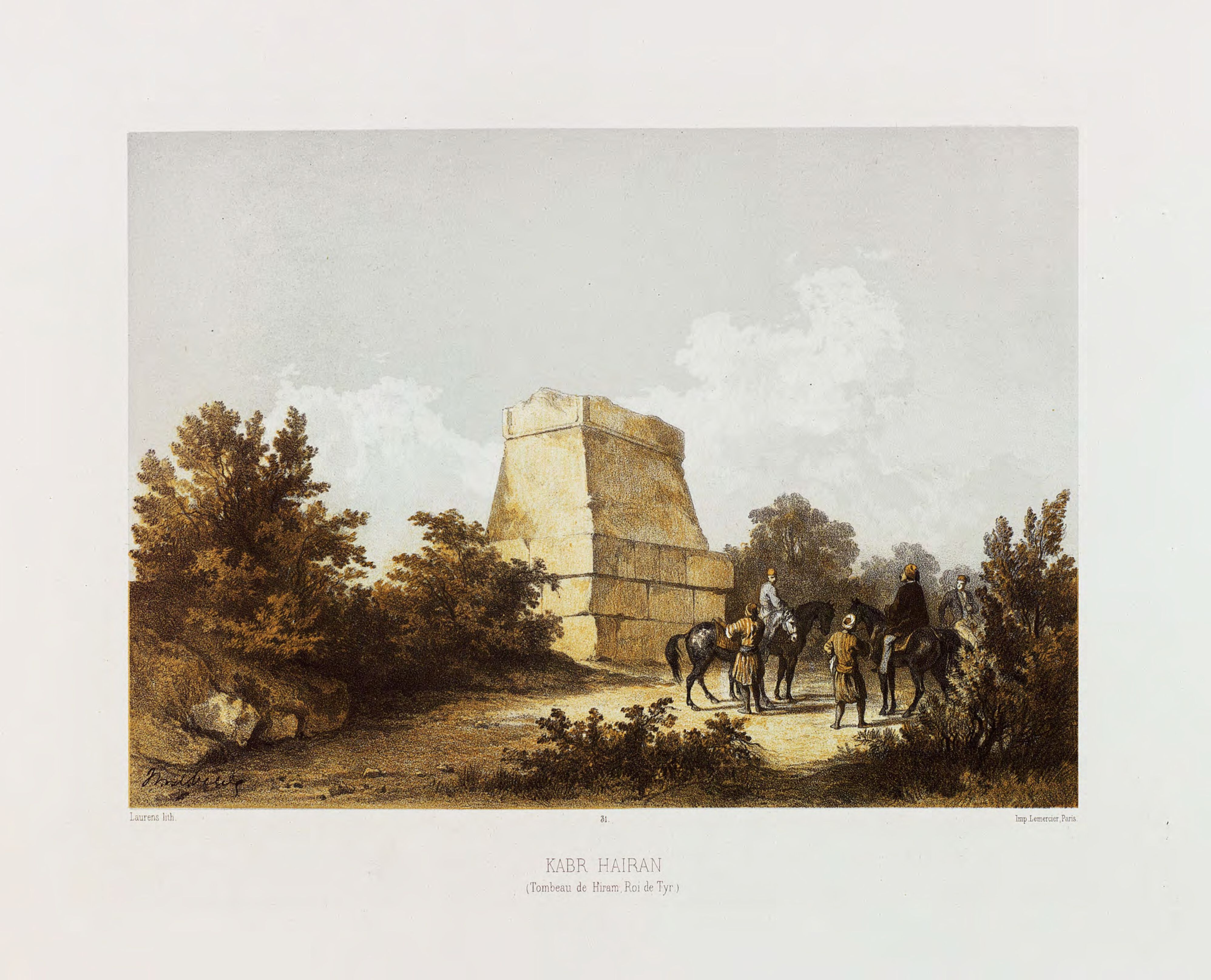
Tomb of Hiram, by van de Velde, 1857

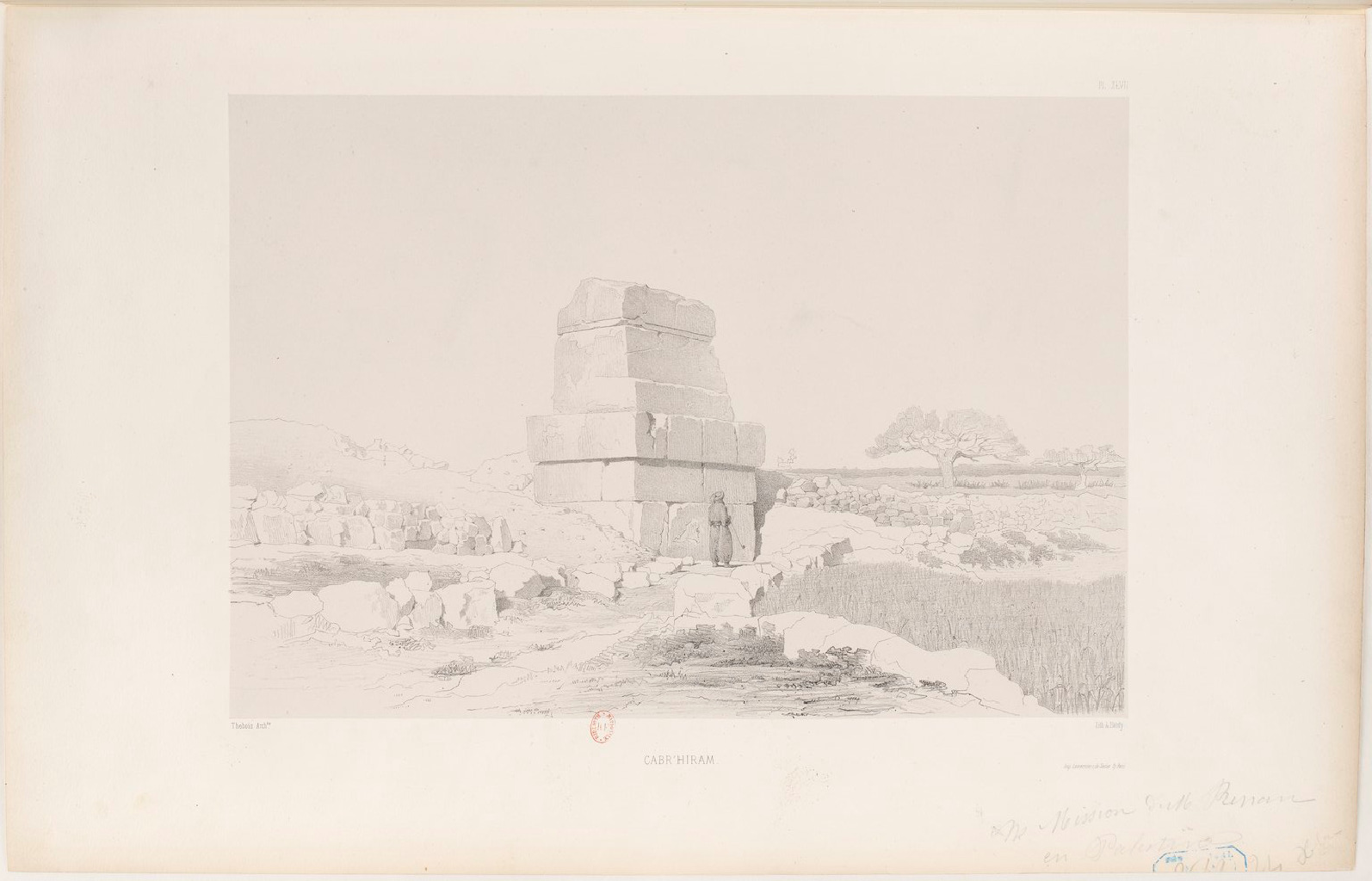
Tomb of Hiram, and surroundings, by Renan, 1864

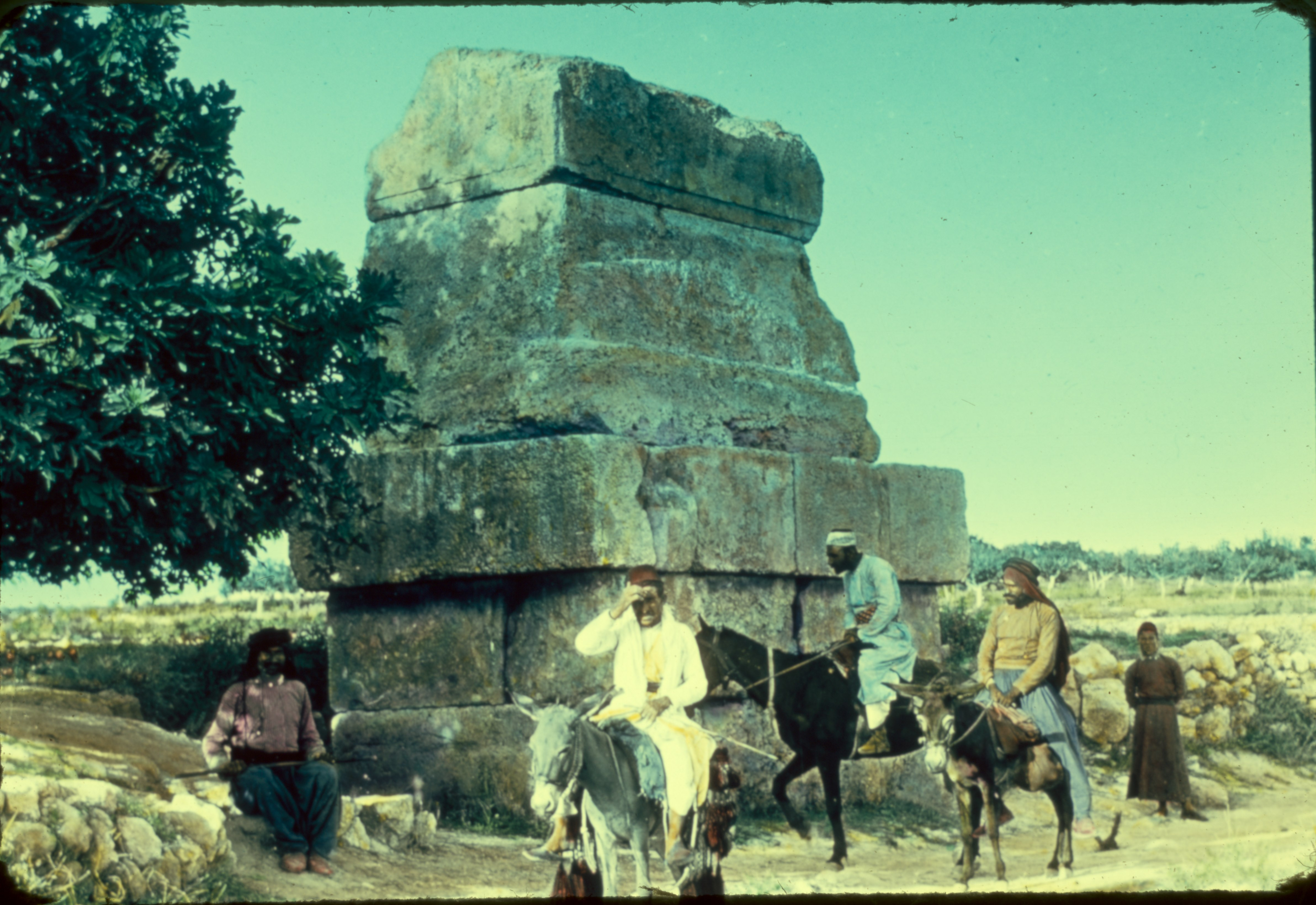
In the 1950s/60s

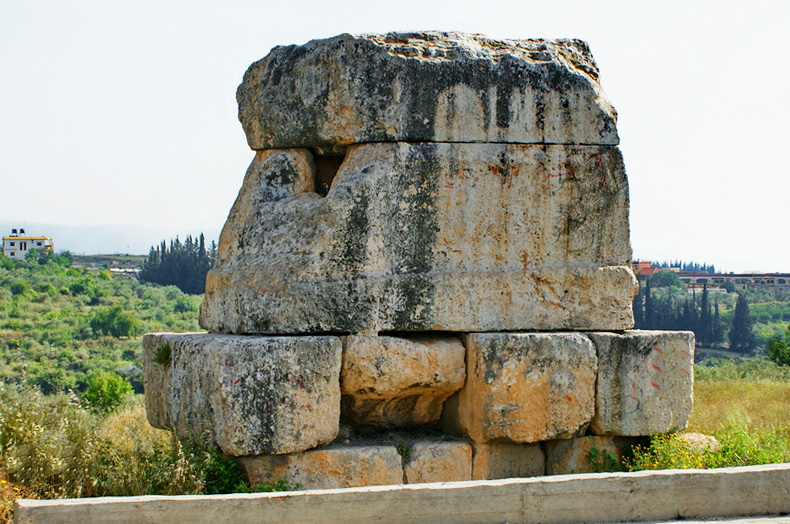
The "Tomb of Hiram", as seen in 2009

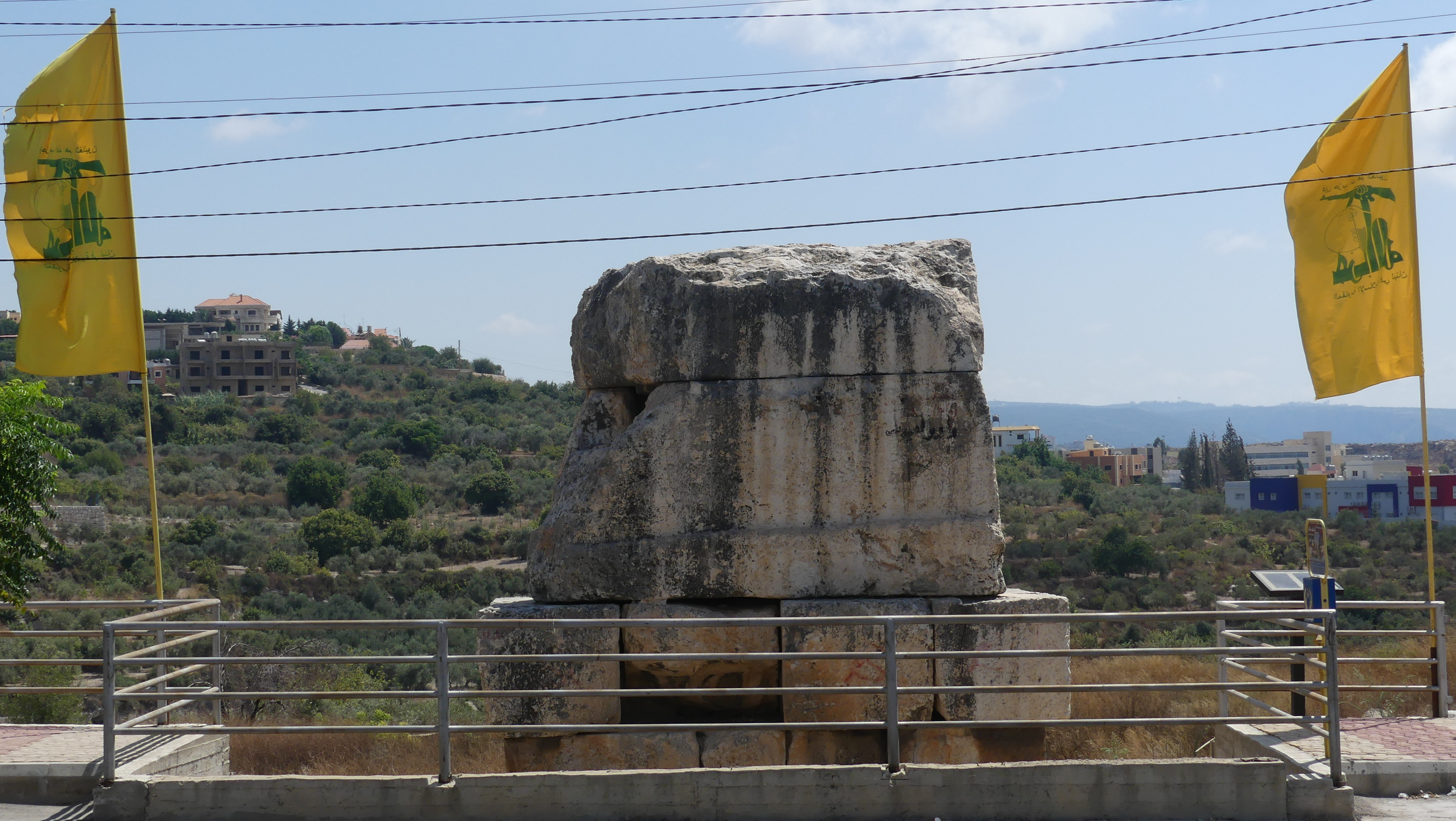
Vertical versions of the Hezbollah flag flying at the Tomb of Hiram
