= Khalil Ahmad Khalil =

Lebanese researcher and translator

- Born: November 12, 1942 (age 83); Sur, South Lebanon
- Education: University of Lyon - University of Paris
- Occupations: Professor; academic; writer; translator; researcher; intellectual; sociologist
- Title: Professor
- Political party: Progressive Socialist Party in Lebanon (former leader)

Khalil Ahmad Khalil (Arabic: خليل أحمد خليل; born November 12, 1942) is a Lebanese intellectual, researcher, translator, prolific, and academic. He was born in 1942 in Sur, South Lebanon. He has many works in the fields of sociology in religion, politics, culture and philosophy, as well as a great number of translations, including Lalande's Encyclopedia of Philosophy and the glossary of philosophical terms. He is considered one of the most prominent Arab intellectuals of the 20th century, and a leading member of the Progressive Socialist Party. He joined the Party in 1968, and retired all organizational politics work after the assassination of Party leader Kamal Jumblatt. He received a prize for his published works and translations, which enriched the Arabic library, as well as his academic achievement in the Lebanese University.

== Early life ==
Khalil Ahmad Khalil was born on 12 November 1942 in Sur. The death of two of his siblings had been a traumatizing event for his mother. He initially lived in this city, but later moved to live in a village with his grandmother Souda Al Shamiya, in Gaana, South Lebanon. However, he mostly lived with his aunt Mila’a.

Khalil studied in the English School in Sur, one of the oldest missionary schools in the city. He then received Quranic education when he was in the care of his uncle Ash Sheikh Muhammed Ali As Saaya. He also studied grammar, learning eloquence and the richness of the Arabic language. Afterwards, he studied in Hanouiyeh School, where he learned French in the first and second grade of his elementary school. He returned to his parents' home in Sur when he turned ten years old and enrolled in the Jafaria School, where he received his official certificate. Khalil then lived some of his teenage years in a boarding school in Bahamdoun (the Arabic Institution), there he studied two grades of his senior year in one academic year. Before the end of the school year, he returned to Sur. Khalil was the only student that passed their baccalaureate examinations. Additionally, he studied philosophy in Sidon.

As a child living in the villages of Jabal ‘Amil, Khalil witnessed the 1948 Palestinian expulsion and flight and the suffering of Palestinian refugees, as a result, he started his political and national work. The foundation of this, however, was built in Jafaria School that embraced many parties and political movements within it, examples: Arab Ba'ath movement, Syrian Social Nationalist Party, Arab Nationalists, and communists. All of these parties were present in his school of Sur.

=== First political speech ===
Khalil was 13 years old when he gave his first political speech, which he wrote in 1956 on the anniversary of Balfour Declaration and after the Algerian Revolution. And that was after he asked his Jafaria School principal for permission to do so. As for the first political book he has ever read, it was Jawaharlal Nehru's Glimpses of World History; he also read Al-Awdā'a Al-Tashrī'iyya Fi Al-Duwal Al-'Arabiyya by Sobhi Mahmassani.

=== Time in France ===
Khalil traveled to France to continue his higher education in 1962 and enrolled at the University of Lyon, college of arts and humanities, to earn his bachelor's degree in 1966. Later, he registered his PhD thesis topic in Islamologie supervised by the orientalist Roger Arnaldez. The topic of his thesis was "religious education in Lebanon and its educational, social, and political role", and he received his PhD degree in 1968. He also received his second PhD degree in philosophy in 1984 from the University of Paris under the supervision of François Châtelet, and the topic of his thesis was "Kamal Jumblatt: the unitarian mind speech".

In France, Khalil discovered Sartre's philosophy and was "deceived by it and by existentialism," until he read Sartre's book Reflections on the Jewish Question. The book acted as a declaration of support for Israel, which made Khalil feel betrayed. He wondered why Arabs translated his works and was surprised by Sartre's dualism, as he supported the Algerian Revolution and had advocated for peoples' rights but apparently also supported the colonization of Palestine. He later discovered that the book was in fact a response to Marx's book On the Jewish Question. Around that time, Khalil published his book Sartrism: The Paradox of Politics and Ethics (original: Ālsārtryā wthāft ālsyāsā walāẖlāq).

After this Parisian stage of his life, Khalil started doing research on sociology. He continued working on his intellectual, cultural, social, and political books and translations, as well as his contributions to writing and cooperating with other Lebanese intellectuals to create a cultural magazine and periodical.

=== Kamal Jumblatt ===
After the student protest in France in 1968, Khalil realized that individual political action "is meaningless." Khalil adds, "If you want to work in politics, you need to belong to a party. If there is no party, create your own." This stage was Kamal Jumblatt's, one of the founders of the Progressive Socialist Party in Lebanon. Khalil got to know Jumblatt well, and they were brought together by discussions and debates that lasted for six months and eventually assembled the Progressive Socialist Party. Khalil once described Jumblatt as a "a great mind that insisted on reaching other minds, his legacy is the proof of that persistence." When Jumblatt was martyred, Khalil retired organizational politics work, and devoted himself for academic work, writing, and translations.

== Cultural and political activity ==
Khalil Ahmad Khalil originally started his cultural activity as a poet in 1963 under the guidance of Syrian-Lebanese poet Adunis. At the time, Adunis published his book Assawt Al Akhar, a book on modernism, discussing Khalil's poetry collection Al Abwab. In addition, Adunis translated "Khorooj", one of the poems in the collection. Khalil also published the following four poetic works: Yawmīyāt Fallāḥ Fī Al-Ġābaẗ Al-H̱amrāʼ, Mzāmyr Al-Twrh Al-Fakīrah, Byr Āl-Slāsl, and Nwr ʿlā Ǧdār Al-Mwt. He also published many of his poems in magazines and newspapers. The last poem he published, "Rwāya Al-Rwāya" was in Al-Adab Journal in the days of the late writer Suhayl Idris. Khalil's poems are collected in two volumes.

Khalil's popularity was not for his poetry, but for being a prominent sociologists in the Arab world, and that is in all three fields of teaching, writing, and translation, particularly in political sociology. In the '60s, he started his journey in writing poetry and literature, and gradually progressed to specialized studies. He also worked later on dictionaries, encyclopedias, and translations, the most famous of which being his translation of Lalande's Encyclopedia of Philosophy, which was published by Oueidat Editions & Publications in 1991.

In 2006, after Khalil retired from the Institute of Social Sciences in the Lebanese University, he continued his journey in writing. He has over 140 works.

Khalil made a number of studies on Lebanese folk poetry, and research on the Lebanese war and other topics such as religion and sociology. Moreover, perhaps his most popular works are his dictionaries in political, philosophical, religious, linguistic, mythological, psychosocial, economics and computer terms. He also published a dictionary of humanities in both Arabic and French, and another of social concepts in French, English, and Arabic, as well as an encyclopedia of Arab luminaries.

Khalil's most notable achievement is his translation of Lalande's Encyclopedia of Philosophy. Through that encyclopedia, he attempted to convey the European and global mind in Arabic. He spent four years working on the project. With the help of Ahmad Oueidat, Oueidat Editions & Publications owner, who funded the project after taking out a mortgage on his apartment for 1 million Lebanese pounds, Khalil was able to complete his work.

Khalil has an interest in physical theories as well, which is related to the way in which leading physicists interpret the universe. This was made clear in his latest writings, particularly in ʿql Āl-ʿlm Wʿql Āl-Whm, and other articles, as well as Ḥkmt Allah, his translation of the book La Pensée de Dieu by the Bogdanoff brothers, which has not been published yet. He also worked on a project titled Ālmwswʿā Ālqrānyā between the years of 1956 and 2000, which is an encyclopedia that is yet to see the light.

=== Between the physical mind and the mythical mind ===
Khalil Ahmad Khalil says in an interview:

"The physical mind sees things directly and tests them, where the mythical mind imagines things, and it is important to distinguish between the two. In my book, ʿql Āl-ʿlm Wʿql Āl-Whm I added a map of out human body. The body consists of minds, and these minds are not just a brain, as the human body is made up of 100 trillion cells and each cell has its own mind and works on its own and with others. Cancer is but a defect in cell growth that creates an internal battle as it fails to perform its formative duty of cooperating. Cells are made to divide, hence Allah says in the Quran, "The mutual rivalry for piling up [the good things of this world] diverts you [from the more serious things], until you visit the graves," and it does not just refer to human reproduction, but to atom reproduction as well, as we are atoms, and planet Earth is an atom in the cosmic system that consists of 120 billion galaxies. "Will you not then understand?" My question here, why did westerners, specifically Europeans and American, contribute to Greek physics and Greek rationalism, but not Arabs, even though they have known about it for longer? Bearing in mind that physical science was mentioned in the Quran, that is without taking the direction Dr. Yusuf Marwa, author of Ālʿlwm Ālṭbyʿyā Fy Ālqrān Ālkrym had taken in his book. The Quran is a call to use the mind expertly, carefully, and critically, however, when ignorance prevails, fewer become the knowledgeable."

Khalil ends the interview saying:

"in my estimation, after the year 2060, the Arab generation will start learning from painful historical experiences, after the forests burned down and the seeds grew in Arab and Islamic lands and a new day will come. All of this is connected to the burst of light of reason and knowledge in these burning lands. If that explosion never happens, Arabs will not rise."

== Major works ==
Khalil has about 65 works in Arabic, and about 70 Arabicized books. In addition, it can be said that he has composed a set of foundational books, these include:

- Maḍmūn al-usṭūrah fī al-fikr al-ʻArabī, 1973.[23] [translation: Mythology in the Arab Mentality].
- Naḥwa sūsyūlūǧīya li't-taqāfa aš-šaʻbīya: numūdaǧ Lubnān, 1979. [translation: Toward a Sociology of Popular Culture in Lebanon].
- Ālǧbhā ālwṭnyā wālʿml ālšʿby, 1979. The book was made in collaboration with Farhan Saleh. [translation: The National Front and People's Action Party].
- The Origins of Ismailism: A Study of the Historical Background of the Fatimid Caliphate by Bernard Lewis. Reviewed and presented by Khalil Ahmad Khalil, 1980.
- Mustaqbal al-falsafah al-ʻArabīyah, 1981. [translation: The future of Arab Philosophy].
- La dialectique de la durée by Gaston Bachelard. [translation: The Dialectic of Duration]. Translated by Khalil Ahmad Khalil, 1981.
- Ālʿrb wāldymqrāṭyā: bḥṯ fy syāst ālmstqbl [translation: Arabs and Democracy: A research on the Future of Politics] (192 pages), and Ālʿrb wālqyāda: bḥṯ āǧtmāʿy fy mʿnā ālslṭā wdwr ālqāʿd [translation: Arabs and Leadership: A Social Research on the Meaning of Power and the Role of a Leader] (a foundational work on political sociology) (288 pages), 1984.
- Ālmfāhym ālasāsya fy ʿlm ālaǧtmāʿ, 1984. [translation: The Principles of Sociology].
- Kamāl Junblāṭ: thawrat "al-amīr al-ḥadīth", 1984. [translation: Kamal Jumblatt: The Revolution of the Modern Prince].
- Ālmrā ālʿrbya wqḍāyā āltġyyr, 1985. [translation: The Arab Woman and Social Change].
- Al-ʻaql fī al-Islām, 1993. Originally a scientific research that was presented in Lebanese University.
- Jadalīyat al-Qurʼān, 1994. [translation: The Dialectic of Qur'an].
- Muʻjam al-muṣṭalaḥāt al-falsafīyah: ʻArabī-Faransī-Inklīzī, 1995. [translation: Arabic-French-English Dictionary of Philosophical Terms].
- Sūsyūlūjīyā al-Junūn al-siyāsī wa-al-thaqāfī : musāhamah fī naqd al-ḥiwār al-dīnī bayna al-Islām wa-al-Masīḥīyah, 1997. [translation: The Sociology of Political and Cultural Madness: A Contribution to the Critique of religious discourse of Islam and Judaism].
- Mʿǧm ālmṣṭlḥāt ālasṭwryā, 1997. [translation: Dictionary of Mythological Terms].
- Naqd al-ʻaql al-siḥrī: qirāʼah fī turāth al-thaqāfah al-shaʻbīyah al-ʻArabīyah, 1998. [translation: A Critique of the Magical Mind: A Reading on the Heritage of Arab Folk Culture].
- Muʻjam al-muṣṭalaḥāt al-siyāsīyah wa-al-diblūmāsīyah: ʻArabī-Faransī-Inklīzī, 1999. [translation: Arabic-French-English Dictionary of Political and Diplomatic Terms].
- Mwswʿt aʿlām ālʿrb ālmbdʿyn fy ālqrn ālʿšryn, 2001. [translation: Encyclopedia of 20th Century Arab Luminaries].
- Naqd al-taḍlīl al-ʻaqlī: Shīʻat Lubnān wa-al-ʻālam al-ʻArabī: Hal hum ākharūn fī al-niṣf al-ākhīr min al-qarn al-ʻishrīn?, 2001.[50] [translation: A Critique on Misinformation: The Shia of Lebanon and the Arab World: Are They "Others" in the Latter Half of the 20th Century?].
- Vocabulaire technique et critique de la philosophie by André Lalande. [translation: Encyclopedia of Philosophy]. Translated by Khalil Ahmad Khalil, 2001.
- Āltwryṯ ālsyāsy fy ālanẓma ālǧmhwrya ālʿrbya ālmʿāṣra, 2003. [translation: Political Heredity in Contemporary Republican Arab Regimes].
- Mulḥaq mawsūʻaẗ al-siyāsaẗ, 2003 (739 pages).خليل, خليل أحمد (2003). ملحق موسوعة السياسة (in Arabic). المؤسسة العربية للدراسات والنشر والتوزيع. [translation: Encyclopedia of Politics].
- Sūsiyūlūjiyā al-jumhūr al-siyāsī al-dīnī fī al-Sharq al-Awsaṭ al-muʻāṣir, 2005. أحمد, خليل، خليل (2005). سوسيولوجيا الجمهور السياسي الديني في الشرق الأوسط المعاصر (in Arabic). AIRP. ISBN 978-9953-36-731-6.
- "سوسيولوجيا الجمهور السياسي والديني - البيان". 25 July 2005. [translation: The Sociology of the Political-Religious in Contemporary Middle East].
- Al-Ightiyāl: ḥarb al-ẓilāl wa-al-ʻunf al-muqaddas, 2011. [translation: Assassination: The War of Shadows and Sacred Violence].
- Li-mādhā yakhāfu al-ʻArab al-ḥadāthah? baḥth fī al-badūqrāṭīyah, 2011. [translation: Why are Arabs Afraid of Modernity? A Research on Bedoucracy].
- Jadalīyāt al-sulṭah wa-al-fatwá ʻashīyat thawrāt al-rabīʻ al-ʻArabī, 2014. [translation: The Dialectics of Power and Fatwa: The Revolutions of Arab Spring].
- ʿql alʿlm wʿql alwhm, 2015. [translation: Reason and Illusion].
