= Al Hadatha =

- Discipline: Cultural studies
- Language: Arabic; English; French

Publication details
- History: 1994
- Publisher: Al Hadatha (Lebanon)
- Frequency: Quarterly
- License: License from the Ministry of Information (230 / 9-21 / 1993)

Standard abbreviations
- ISO 4: Al Hadatha

Indexing
- ISSN: 2790-1785
- LCCN: 97648400
- OCLC no.: 1034540676

Links
- Journal homepage

Al Hadatha (Arabic: مجلة الحداثة) is a refereed academic cultural quarterly magazine that has been published in Beirut, Lebanon, since 1994 based on a license from the Ministry of Information. Since its first issue, the journal has been concerned with publishing academic research after it has been submitted to a specialized scientific committee.

== Beginnings ==
The journal was formed after continuous working meetings between its editor-in-chief Farhan Saleh and many researchers and academics from Lebanon and the Arab world. Afterwards, a number of them became part of the advisory body of the journal. Below are some of the researchers and academics included in the advisory body of the journal, note that some of them passed away:

Abdullah Al-Alayli, Salam Al-Rassi, Ahmad Abu Saad, Toufic El Bacha, Walid Gholmieh, Khalil Ahmad Khalil, Frederick Matouk, Muhammad Shya, Elham Kallab, Moufid Abu Murad, Akram Kanso, Jaber Asfour, El-Sayed Yassin, Philip Hatti, Zahi Nader, and Ahmad Morsi, Mohamed El-Gohary, Alia Shukri, Nabila Ibrahim, Abdel-Hamid Burayo, Nimr Sarhan ... etc.

== Journal Aims ==
The journal aims to build strong relations with most institutions of higher education in Lebanon and the Arab world. It has been accredited in various universities. The research published in it was cited in dozens of academic papers including scientific theses and doctoral theses, as well as in dozens of intellectual, cultural, social, literary and heritage publications in Lebanon and in the Arab world. Issues of the journal can be found in various American and European universities.

The journal publishes research from a wide range of academics, thinkers, researchers, and writers in Lebanon and the Arab world. Its topics range from the human, social and political sciences, to intellectual, heritage, literary, critical, artistic and media issues ...
