= Farhan Saleh (writer) =

Lebanese writer and researcher

Farhan Osman Saleh
- Born: 11 September 1947 (age 79); Lebanon
- Education: PhD in philosophy and religion
- Occupations: Writer, and researcher

Farhan Osman Saleh (Arabic:فرحان صالح) is a writer, researcher and militant from Lebanon. He was born in 1947, in the town of Kfarchouba in southern Lebanon. He is known for supporting Arab nations involved in the Israeli–Palestinian conflict. Saleh has published several books on politics, social, history and culture. He also writes fot Lebanese and Arab newspapers and magazines. He has also contributed to the establishment of a house for the dissemination of enlightening and modernist thought, a cultural magazine, and a seminar for cultural dialogue with a group of thinkers and intellectuals in Lebanon and the Arab world.

== Early life ==
Farhan was born on 11 September 1947 in the town of Kfarchouba, in the Hasbaya District of the Nabatieh Governorate. His southern village overlooks Galilee in Palestine, and from the opposite side the Syrian Golan. Since his childhood, he has been aware of the Nakba and the diaspora of the Palestinian people, and has closely followed the struggle.

Farhan was the fourth of his nine brothers and sisters. Both his father, Othman, and his mother, Masada Abdullah, farmed. He received his primary education in an attic of one of the town houses, where he learned everything up to the fourth year of primary school, when he left to complete his education later outside the town. In 1960 he began travelling to the capital Beirut, where he worked during the day as a printing assistant and distributor for the Beirut Al-Masaa newspaper. He then entered the Beirut Higher Institute to complete his first degree, before moving on to various educational institutes to complete his education. He eventually received a High School degree, and later, he obtained a doctorate degree in Philosophy and Religions, a certificate of Merit and high esteem in Political history majored with the rank of researcher historian and equivalent to the international degree / Doctor of Philosophy.]

== Political and cultural activities ==
Farhan's follow-up to journalistic writings, and his keeping up to intellectual and cultural activity, allowed him to enter the portal of political action through the Nasserism movement, the Arab nationalist movement and others, so he met with Mohsen Ibrahim and Muhammad Kashli, as well as with the thinker and politician Kamal Jumblatt, the Palestinian activist and thinker Naji Alloush, and other thinkers and leaders of the National party.

Farhan joined the resistance work with Fatah in 1968, and a year earlier, he had married Zulfa Shibli.

In 1975, Israel destroyed his town, Kfarchouba, and his family home, so he settled in Beirut after he left it in 1968, returning to his town and villages near the Palestinian borders, as resistance and militants, following the defeat of the Arabs in the 1967 war.

Farhan worked in Beirut, and after leaving the Al-Masaa newspaper, he worked as the director of the library of Dar taliaa in the Tariq Al-Jadida distract near the Beirut Arab University, and near the Palestinian camps, adjacent to the events of the 1970s. Familiar with factional leaders and intellectuals thought at that time; his work in the library was like a school that compensated him for what he missed from formal and academic studies.

Farhan moved away from political and organizational activity in the late 1980s, to establish a publishing house under the title "al -hadatha" (Modernism) concerned with publishing cultural, intellectual, enlightenment and creative works, and specialized translations. Then, in 1993, under the same name, he launched Al Hadatha Magazine, a cultural periodical. Before this, in 1990, before that, Saleh's thinking had begun to establish a cycle of cultural dialogue, after the end of the events that had rocked Lebanon as a result of the civil war, which led to "interruption of dialogue and cases of partnership between the conflicting Lebanese factions, which has led to violence, killing and mutual demolition." The aim of establishing the workshop was to move beyond the culture of war and seek to contribute to spreading the culture of peace, to revive a new era of national and human values and norms, to participate in the issues, concerns and sciences of the time, and to activate another mentality of self-discovery and looking at the place and the course of events.

Farhan contributed, together with a group of Lebanese and Arab intellectuals and academics, to launching the first conference of popular culture in Lebanon in 1993, the first conference of public poetry in 1995, and the second conference of Lebanese-Arab popular culture in 1999, and the sixth conference of popular culture in 2009.

== Work and writings ==
In most of his writings, Farhan Saleh focuses on the criticism of the defeatist Arab mentality, with the aim of crystallizing a new Arab thought that has emerged from the culture of delusion, superstition and surrender to the culture of science, knowledge and awareness. This has been explained in dozens of articles, dialogues, research studies, and books that he has published so far. His most notable writings include:

- South Lebanon: Its Reality and Issues – Dar Al Taleea 1973 (144 pages)
- The Palestinian Revolution and the Development of the National issue: On Lebanon's Events – Al-Rai Al-Jadid Printing Press (General Union of Palestinian Writers and Journalists) 1975 (168 pages)
- The National Front and Popular Action – in cooperation with Khalil Ahmad Khalil – Dar Al-Quds 1979
- Historical materialism and Arab national consciousness: (The Roots) – Dar Al-Hadatha (Modernism House) – Beirut 1979 (152 pages)
- The Lebanese Civil War and the Crisis of the Arab Revolution – Dar Al-Kateb (Writer's House)- Beirut 1979 (167 pages)
- The dialectic of the relationship between Arab thought and heritage – Dar Al-Hadatha (Modernism House) 1979
- The Language of the South (Literary visions) – Dar Al-Hadatha (Modernism House) 1984
- Concerns of Arab Culture (1) – 1988, Concerns of Arab Culture (2) – Dar Al-Hadatha (Modernism House) 2007 (224 pages)
- In Identity and Heritage – Dar Al-Hadatha (Modernism House) 2002
- The Betrayed Life or Theater and Politics, Beirut: Dar Al-Hadatha (Modernism House) for Publishing and Distribution 2010
- kfarchouba: A story of love ... biography of a place part 1: Dar Al-Hadatha (Modernism House) 2006 (208 pages), part 2: Cairo, Higher Council for Culture 2015
- Love Letters to Janet (A Generation Novel) – Dar Al-Hadatha (Modernism House) – Beirut, and Dar thakert Al-nass- Algeria – 2008
- Heritage and History: Readings in Historical Thought: From Jamal Hamdan – Jawad Ali – Ahmed Sadiq Saad – Adel and Munir Ismail – Abdel Qader Jaghloul – Kamal Al Salibi – Cairo: Ministry of Culture: The General Authority for Cultural Palaces 2015 (342 pages)
- On the Experience of the Muslim Brotherhood: From Gamal Abdel Nasser to Abdel Fattah el-Sisi – Presented by El-Sayed Yassin, Cairo: The General Authority for Cultural Palaces, 2015
- Muhammad Ali and Abdel Nasser: The Art of the Arab Revival: Rise and Decline, 1805–2013 – Cairo: The General Authority for Cultural Palaces 2018 and the Independence Center for Strategic Studies and Consulting
