= Youssef Hourany =

Lebanese writer (1931–2019)

Youssef Lotof Hourany
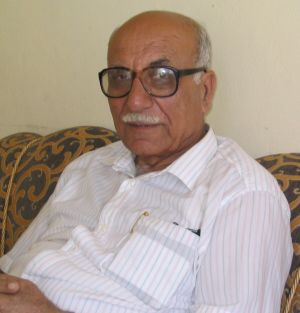
- Born: 25 December 1931; Yaroun, South Lebanon
- Died: October 19, 2019 (aged 87–88)
- Citizenship: Lebanon

Notes
- Brother: Dr Eid Hourany Daughter: Dominique Hourani

Youssef Hourany (25 December 1931 – 19 October 2019) was a Lebanese writer, archeologist and historian. Hourany received his diploma in philosophy, from the Lebanese University, and his PhD on the ancient philosophy of history from The Université Saint-Esprit de Kaslik (Arabic: جامعة الروح القدس – الكسليك).

Hourany taught ancient history in the Université Saint-Esprit de Kaslik from 1970 to 1977, and from 1977 to 1995 he taught philosophy and archeology in the Lebanese University, then he retired with professor grade. He kept writing books and publishing research until 2017.

== Family ==
Hourany had five children: Monique, Dominique, Marwan, Dania and Lotof.

== Bibliography ==
Books Published in Arabic

- Man is not a Crowd, Al Hayat Library, Beirut 1956
- Man and Civilization (Introduction, 2nd ed., Al Assriyat Library, Saida 1973
- Lebanon in the Value of its History (Phoenician Era), 2nd ed., An-Nahar Publishing House, Beirut 1992
- Mentality Structure of The Ancient Civilizations in the Mediterranean East, end ed., An-Nahar Publishing House, Beirut 1992
- Ethics of Wisdom in the Babylonian Cultural Heritage, An-Nahar Publishing House, Beirut 1994
- Cana of Galilee in South Lebanon, (Arabic, English & French), ed. By Ministry of Tourism, Beirut 1994
- The Unknown and the Neglected History of South Lebanon, ed. Al Hadatha, Beirut 1999
- The unknown History of the Phoenicians through Philon of Byblos and Sanchoniathon of Beirut, ed. Assakafa Publishing House, Beirut 1999
- The Epic of Beirut Maymoonat, of the Poet Nonnus, Assakafa Publishing House, Beirut 1999
- Heritage from Lebanon, ed. Al Hadatha, Beirut 2003
- Unknown Chapters of Arabs’ History and Language, ed. Al Hadatha, Beirut 2010
- Historical readings to meditate ed. Al-hadatha Beirut 2011

== Research ==
- Discovery of Yarmouta, an ancient Phoenician city that disappeared off the coast of today's Lebanon some 3,300 years ago.
- Jabal 'Amelat The History Through Eponyms In South Lebanon B.C.
