= Eid Hourany =

French physicist (1940–2008)

Dr Eid Hourany
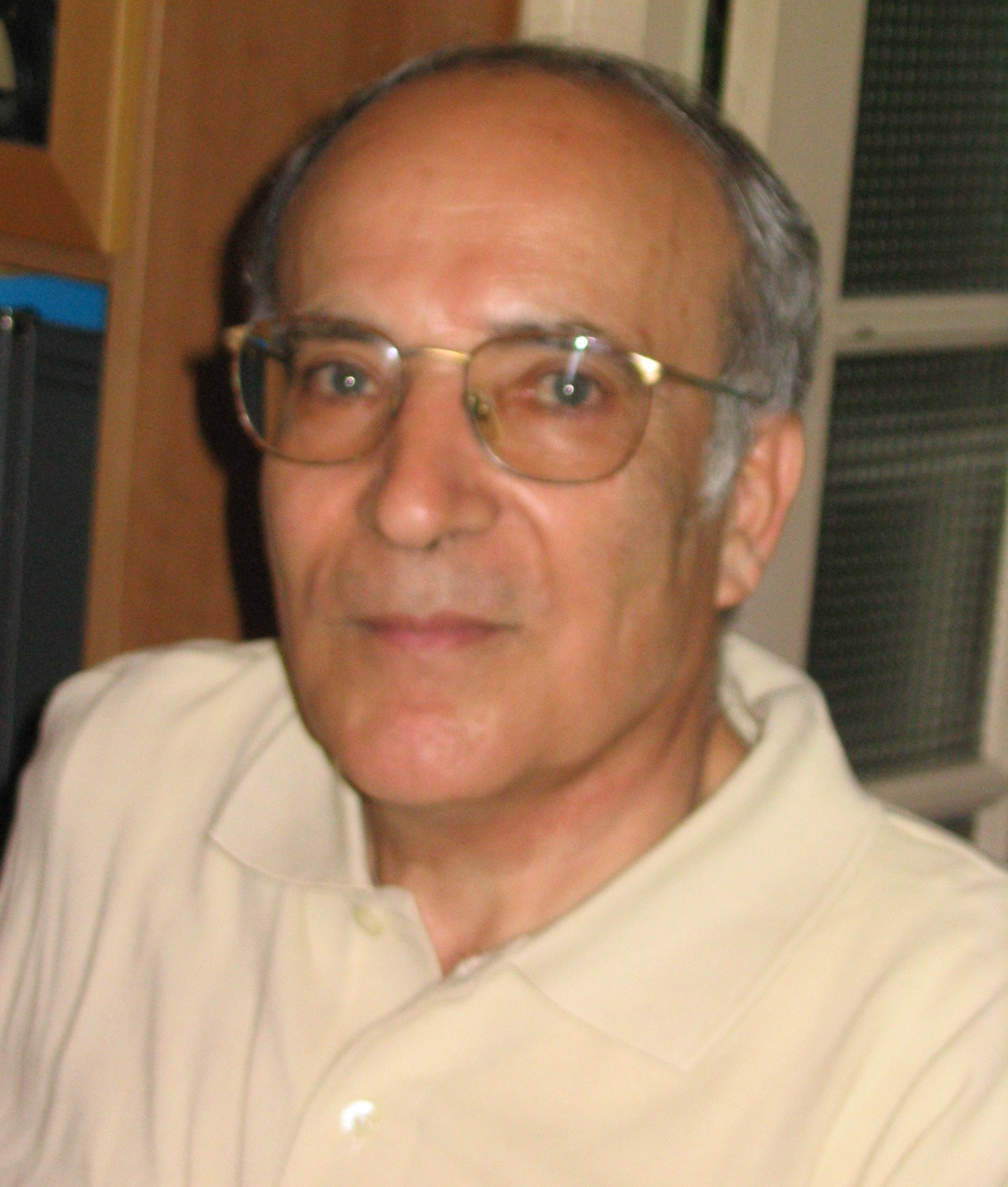
- Born: 18 March 1940; Yaroun, Lebanon
- Died: 17 November 2008 (aged 68)
- Known for: Cluster decay, Research work, Scientific publications
- Relatives: Youssef Hourany (brother)
- Scientific career
- Fields: Physics
- Workplaces: CNRS, Lebanese University
- Doctoral advisor: Toshiko Yuasa

Eid Hourany (18 March 1940 – 17 November 2008) was a French and Lebanese nuclear physicist. He studied in the Science Faculty in the Lebanese University (Arabic: كلية العلوم، الجامعة اللبنانية) at Hadath, Beirut. He achieved his State PhD in France at the Institut of Nuclear Physics (French: Institut de Physique Nucléaire d'Orsay) at Orsay where he was coached by Dr Toshiko Yuasa. From 1971 until 1982, he was Professor in Physics and finally Head of the Physics department at Hadath University (Beyrouth). He joined the French National Research Centre (CNRS) in 1982. From 1982 until 2006 he pursued several research activities and contributed to more than 80 scientific publications. He officially retired from CNRS in 2006 with the grade of "Directeur de Recherche". He continued his research activity until 2008 (year of death)

== Family ==
Eid Hourany was born in Yaroun (South Lebanon) in March 1940. His parents were Lotof and Jamila Hourany. He had two sisters and two brothers. Due to hazardous translation from Arabic in his early French administrative papers, his name was sometimes referred to as "Hourani" instead of "Hourany".

== Research ==
He carried out his first research work during his PhD. From 1992 until 1995 he made major contributions to discoveries in Cluster decay by achieving experimental confirmation of a fine structure in 14C radioactivity of 223Ra. He used for this purpose intense radioactive sources created in CERN accelerator (Genève) and a superconducting magnetic solenoid developed some years before(named "SOLENO"). His latest research activity concerned GRAAL European project(to be documented).

== Lebanese University, Science Faculty ==
He studied physics in the Lebanese University before gaining a scholarship to specialise in nuclear physics in France. From 1971 and after completing his PhD, he taught in the Faculty of Science in the Lebanese University and became the Head of the Physics Department until 1982.
