= Abdallah al-Alayli =

Lebanese intellectual and writer (1914–1996)

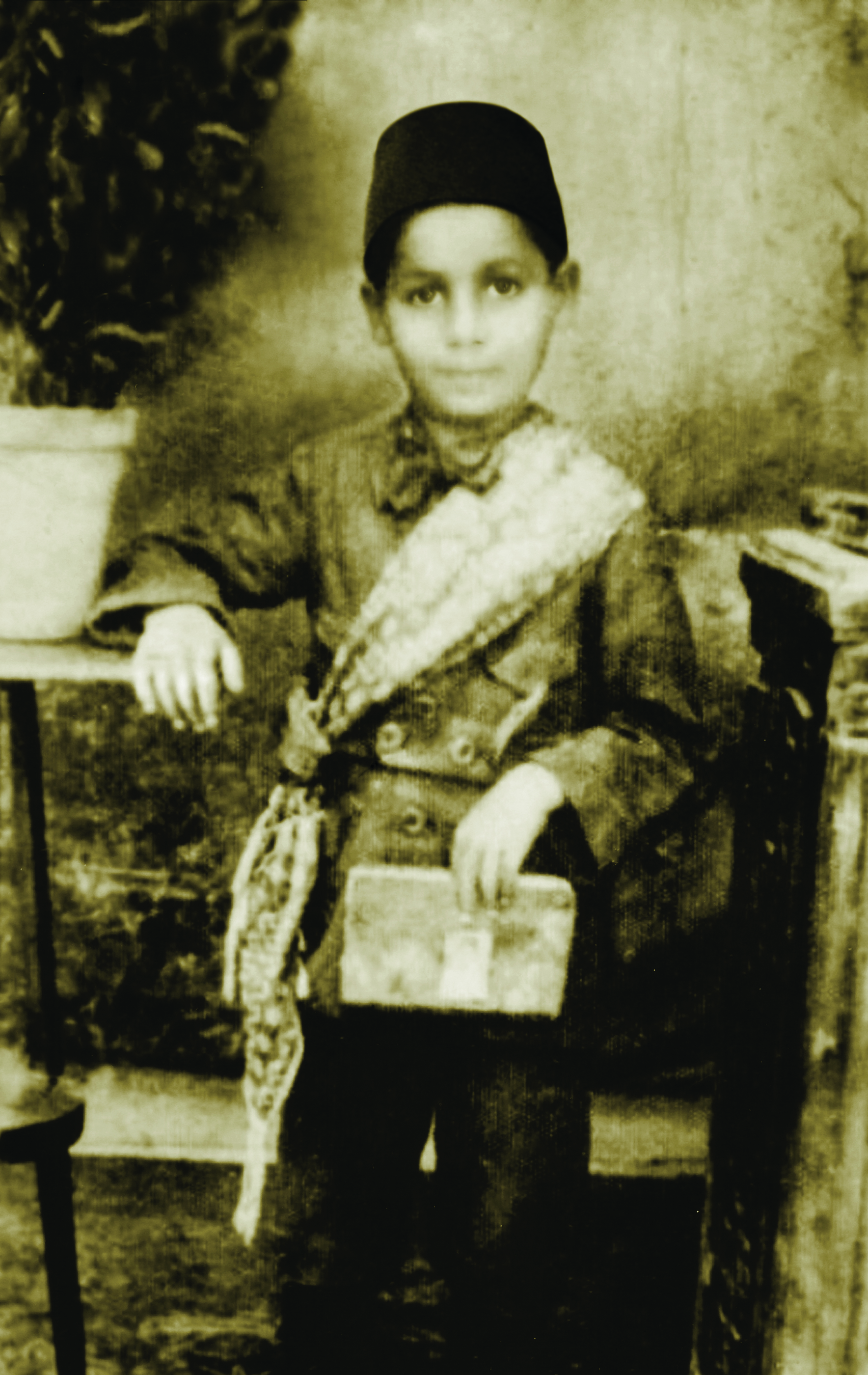
Abdallah al-Alayli 11 years old in 1925 AD

Abdallah al-Alayli (Arabic: عبد الله العلايلي; 1914–1996) was a Lebanese intellectual and writer. His specializations included the Arabic language, Arab history and politics, and Islamic law. His works sparked controversy among Arab audiences, even leading to the banning of some of his books in certain places. He was also a theoretician of Arab nationalism.

== Biography ==
Al-Alayli was born on November 20, 1914, in Beirut, Lebanon. He completed his higher learning at Al-Azhar University in Cairo, Egypt. He held a number of different advanced professional positions during his career within various religious organizations and international scholarly bodies. He was also a member of the Federation of Arabic Language Associations (اتحاد مجامع اللغة العربية).

He died on December 4, 1996.

== Works ==
- Where is the mistake? Correcting understandings and the theory of renewal - أين الخطأ ؟ تصحيح مفاهيم ونظرة تجديد -1978
- The great dictionary - المعجم الكبير
- Refining the linguistic approach - تهذيب المقدمة اللغوية - 1968

== Legacy and controversy ==
Al-Alayli's 1978 book, Where is the mistake? Correcting understandings and the theory of renewal, elicited widespread critical reaction and was even banned in certain countries. Sadiq Jalal al-Azm addressed "the big stir that the book generated among the ranks of the Lebanese ulama of all colors and hues," for example, observing:

"The Muslim religious establishment in Lebanon generated enough pressure at the time to have the book quickly recalled from the bookshops.... [I]n spite of its very conventional Arabic and traditional style Alayli’s book is an oblique expose of the ulama’s [religious establishment's] utter mental laziness and a sarcastic commentary on their abysmal ignorance of both their din [religion] and dunya [world]; i.e., of their religious heritage as well as of the encircling modern world that is squeezing them ever more tightly. For those Muslims troubled by the problems and dilemmas inescapably imposed by the requirements of modern life and its quickening pace, Alayli makes many revolutionary suggestions, all ironically argued and defended in the impeccable style of a traditional Muslim faqih and with all the appropriate Koranic quotations, hadith citations and so on."

Generally speaking, al-Alayli's “socialist economic views and his secular writings...have alienated him from religious establishments and Arab regimes."

He has been described as a “foremost Arab linguist and Lebanese Sunni cleric” and as “Lebanon’s revolutionary interpreter of Muslim Shari’a Law."
