= Dominique Hourani =

Lebanese recording artist and model

- دومينيك يوسف حوراني
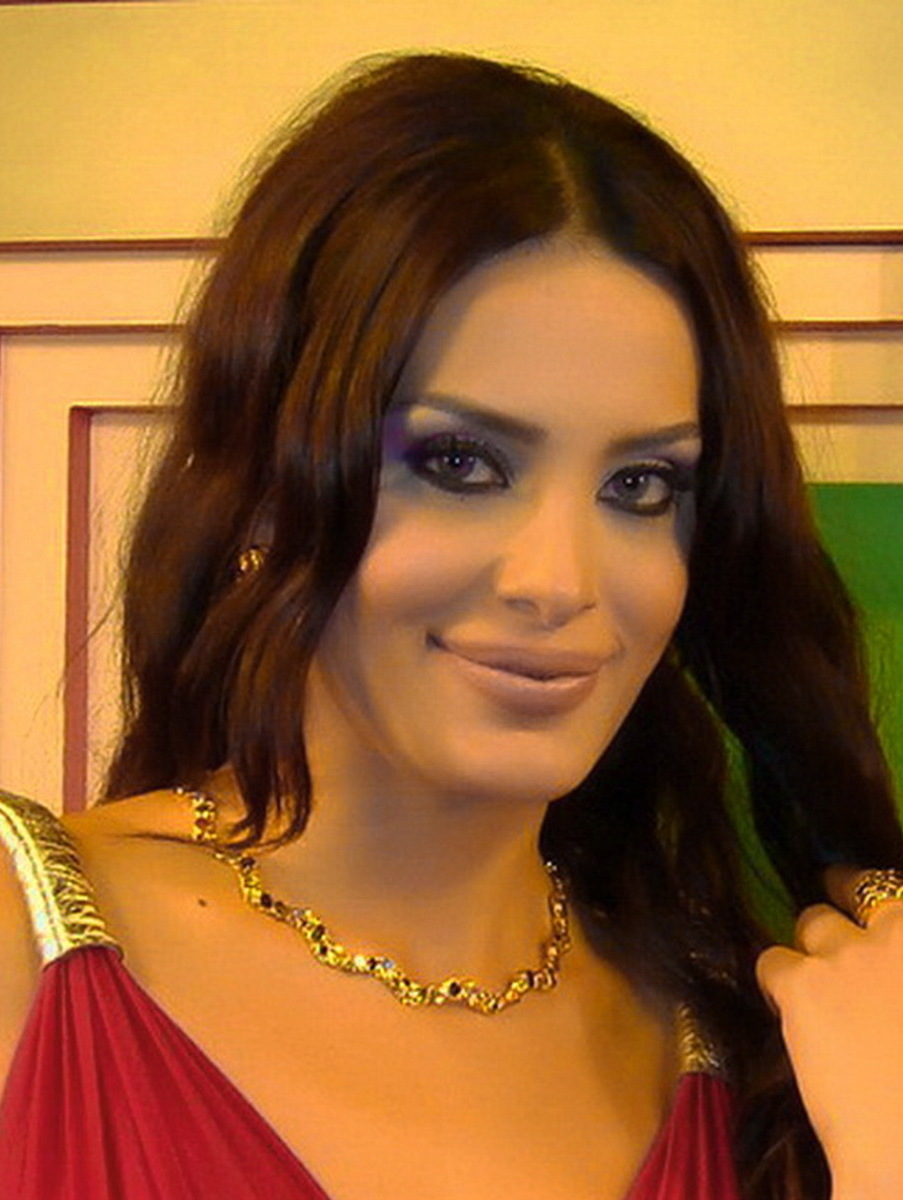
- Hourani in 2010
- Born: Dominique Hourani; Yaroun, Lebanon
- Occupations: Singer, Actress, Model, Designer
- Years active: 2005–present
- Father: Youssef Hourany

Dominique Hourani (Arabic: دومينيك حوراني) is a Lebanese recording artist, actress, designer and former model.

== Personal life ==
In November 2007, Hourani married Austrian-Iranian businessman, Alireza Noukiani, they were married until 2014. Together they have a daughter born in 2008. She currently lives in Egypt and Lebanon.

== Modeling ==
She won a competition with contestants from over 80 countries and was awarded the Miss Intercontinental 2003 title.

== Acting ==
Hourani first appeared on the television series, Oyoun Kha'ena (The eyes of the deceiver), alongside famous TV presenter, Tony Khalife. The series was broadcast in Lebanon and the Arab world on LBC.

In 2009, Hourani decided to go with her first movie El Beeh Romancy, along with Mohamed Adel Emam, Hasan Housni, Lebleba, Mena Arafa and Saad El Soghaier.

== Singing ==
Hourani traveled to America and sang at an Arab American festival concert with more than 300,000 people attending.

== Discography ==
=== Albums ===
- Etriss (2006)
- Kermalik Ya Dominique (2008)
- Dominique 2011 (2011)
