= Hannaouiyah =

Hannaouiyah حنوية Hanaway, Hanawey, Hanouiyeh, Hanawiya, Hannaouiye, Hanaouay, Hanaoueh, Henaweh, Hanawai, Hanâwieh
- Municipality
- Location within Lebanon
- Coordinates: 33°13′16″N 35°16′39″E
- Grid position: 176/291 PAL
- Country: Lebanon
- Governorate: South Governorate
- District: Tyre
- Elevation: 820 ft (250 m)
- Time zone: GMT +3

Hannaouiyah, Hannawiyah, (Levantine Arabic: حنوية, romanized: Ḥannawiyeh) is a municipality in the Tyre District in Southern Lebanon, located north-west of Qana.

== Etymology ==
According to E. H. Palmer, Henawei means "the little bend".

== History ==
In the early 1860s, Ernest Renan noted: " From Kabr Hiram or Henawei to Kana, monuments cut in the rock are met with at every step; they may be counted by hundreds. The Kana road is in this respect the most remarkable I have ever seen. I would point especially to certain caves having round holes cut above them mixed with rockcut tombs. Stone erections in the form of a gallows (presses) abound. Chambers cut in the rock are seen on all sides. There are also buildings, remains of walls. The rocky hill near Kana, especially, is covered with these works, round holes, large and small, in the rock, basins, trenches, etc."

"Turning to the right, in the valley called here Wady Kana, in order to examine the north face of this rocky hill, we find ourselves in the presence of certain strange sculptures cut in the rock. They are completely rude, such as might be executed by a man without any knowledge of drawing or the least education in this direction. They may be divided into three series. The first forms a sort of long procession; the second, placed below, is composed of upright figures. M. de Prunieres, who was with us, saw a third series hidden among the bushes. Impossible to attribute to the simple sport of idle shepherds images which must have required continuous labour, and in which one remarks so much intention; it is also difficult to recognise in them the production of serious art. Similar things are found at Deir Kanun."

In 1875, Victor Guérin found the village to be inhabited by Metualis. He further noted: "On the slopes of the hill on which this village is situated I observed two great ancient presses cut in the rock, each composed of two compartments communicating together, the one to press the grapes and the other to receive the juice. The village is scattered over with cut stones, taken probably from an ancient church consecrated to St. John the Baptist, for a wely there is sacred to Yahia ben Zakaria."

Opposite to Hannaouiyah is a ruined village called Khurbet el Ras, of which nothing is left but broken cisterns. A square stone was found here, having upon certain characters.."

In 1881, the PEF's Survey of Western Palestine (SWP) described it: "A village built of stone, on a hill-top, surrounded by figs, olives, and pomegranates, and some arable soil. It contains 300 Metawileh, and the water supply is from cisterns."

In 1889, Gottlieb Schumacher described it as the "well-built and populous village of Henaweh".

== Demographics ==
In 2014 Muslims made up 99.49% of registered voters in Hannaouiyah. 99.08% of the voters were Shiite Muslims.

== Kabr Hiram ==
Just NNW of Hannaouiyah lies Kabr Hiram ("Tomb of Hiram"), supposedly the tomb of Hiram I, but probably dating to the Persian period, 4–6 centuries after the presumed time of Hiram. All around it are many ruins, and here Renan excavated a Byzantine church dedicated to St Christopher, dating from about 580 CE. At the request of the Emperor, Napoleon III, Renan moved the Byzantine mosaic floor to Louvre, where they still remain.

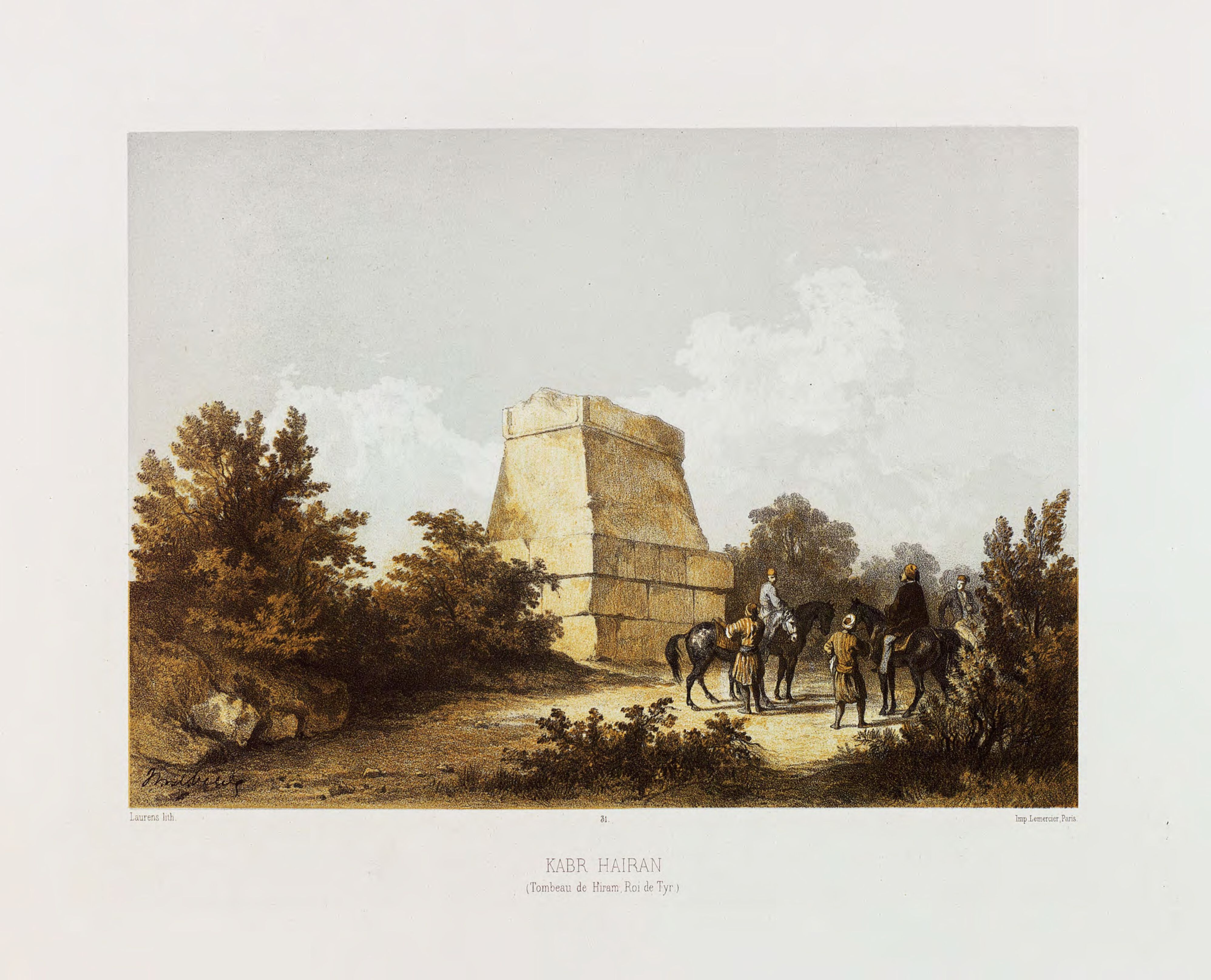
Tomb of Hiram, by van de Velde, 1857

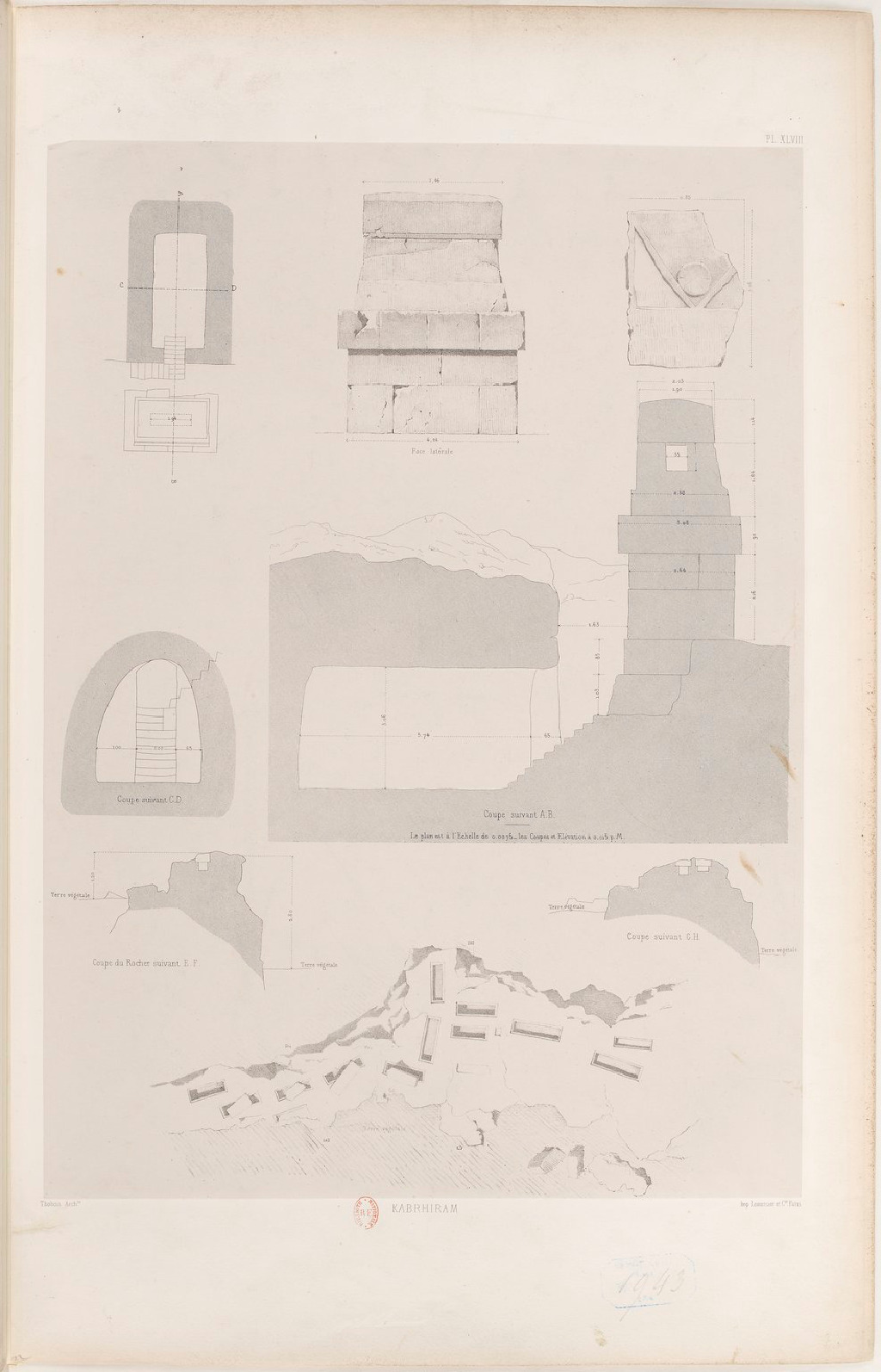
Tomb of Hiram, and surroundings, by Renan, 1864

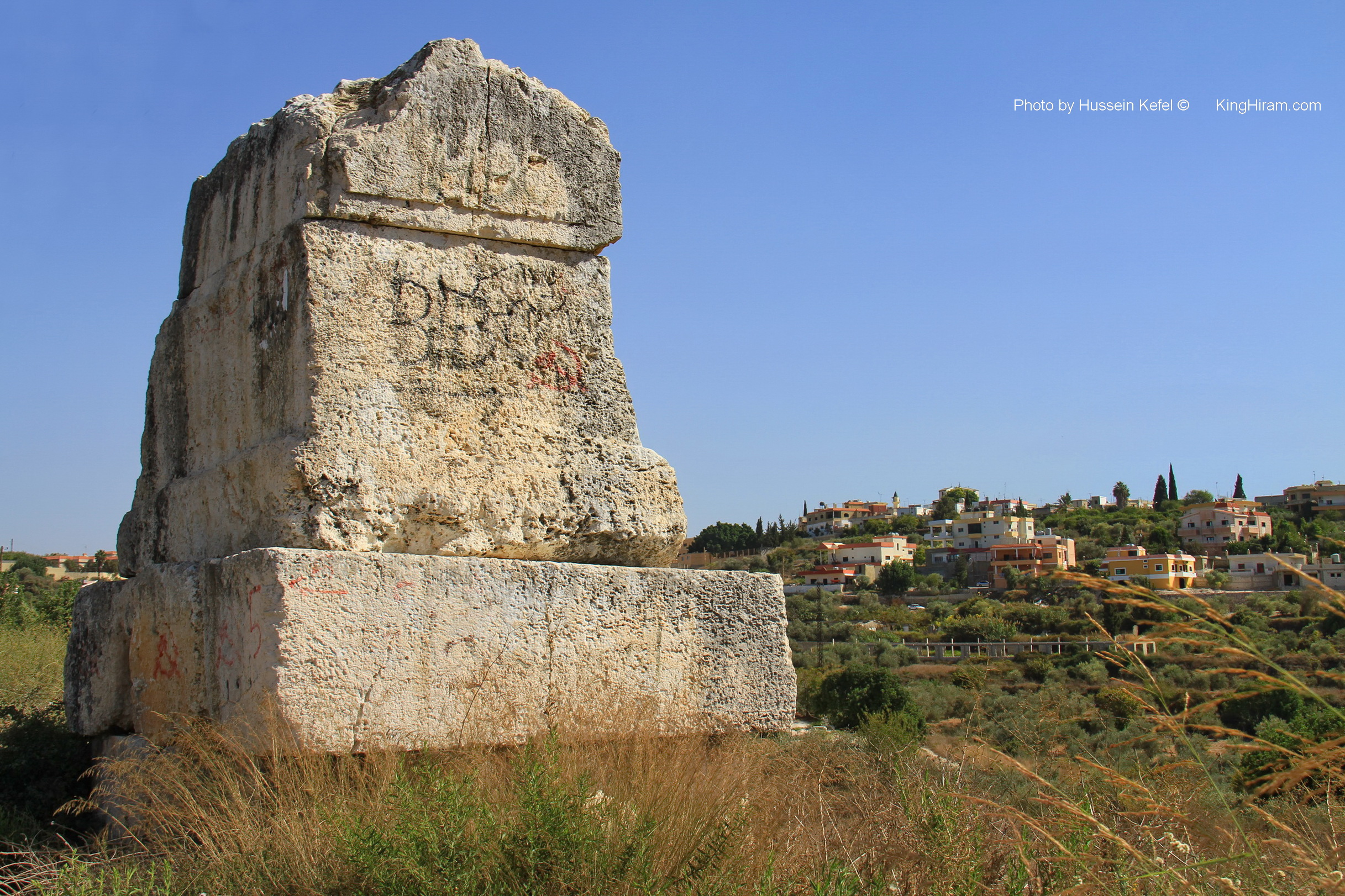
Tomb of Hiram, 2014

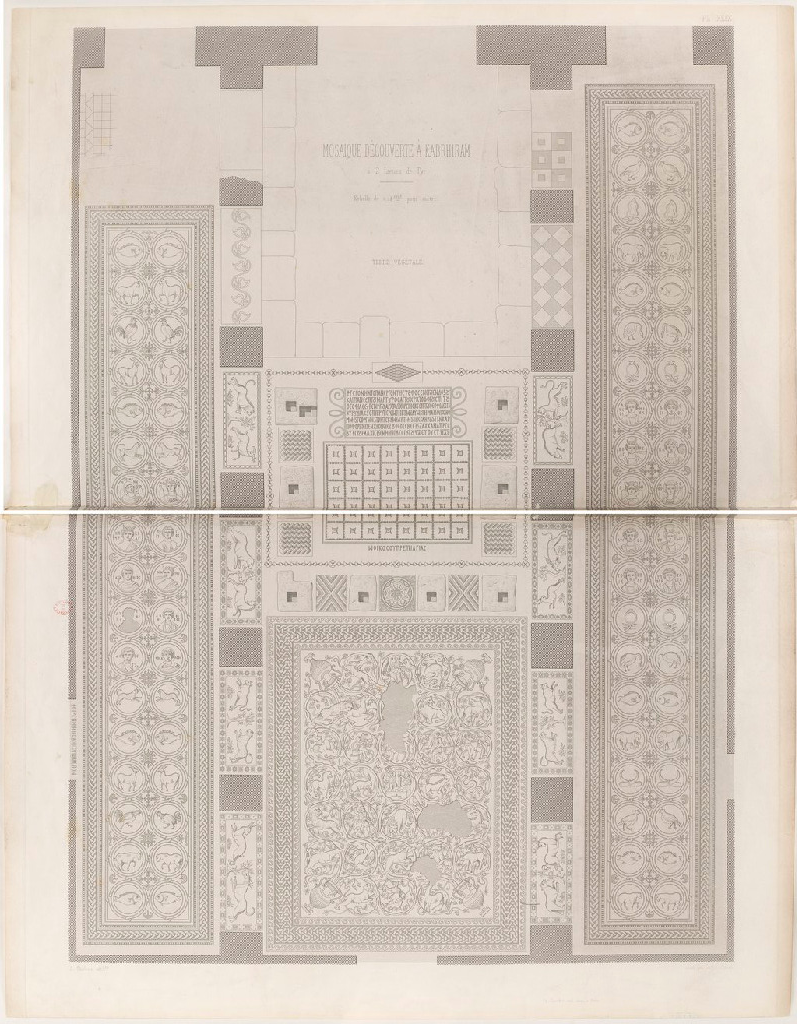
Mosaic of Kabr Hiram, by Renan, 1864

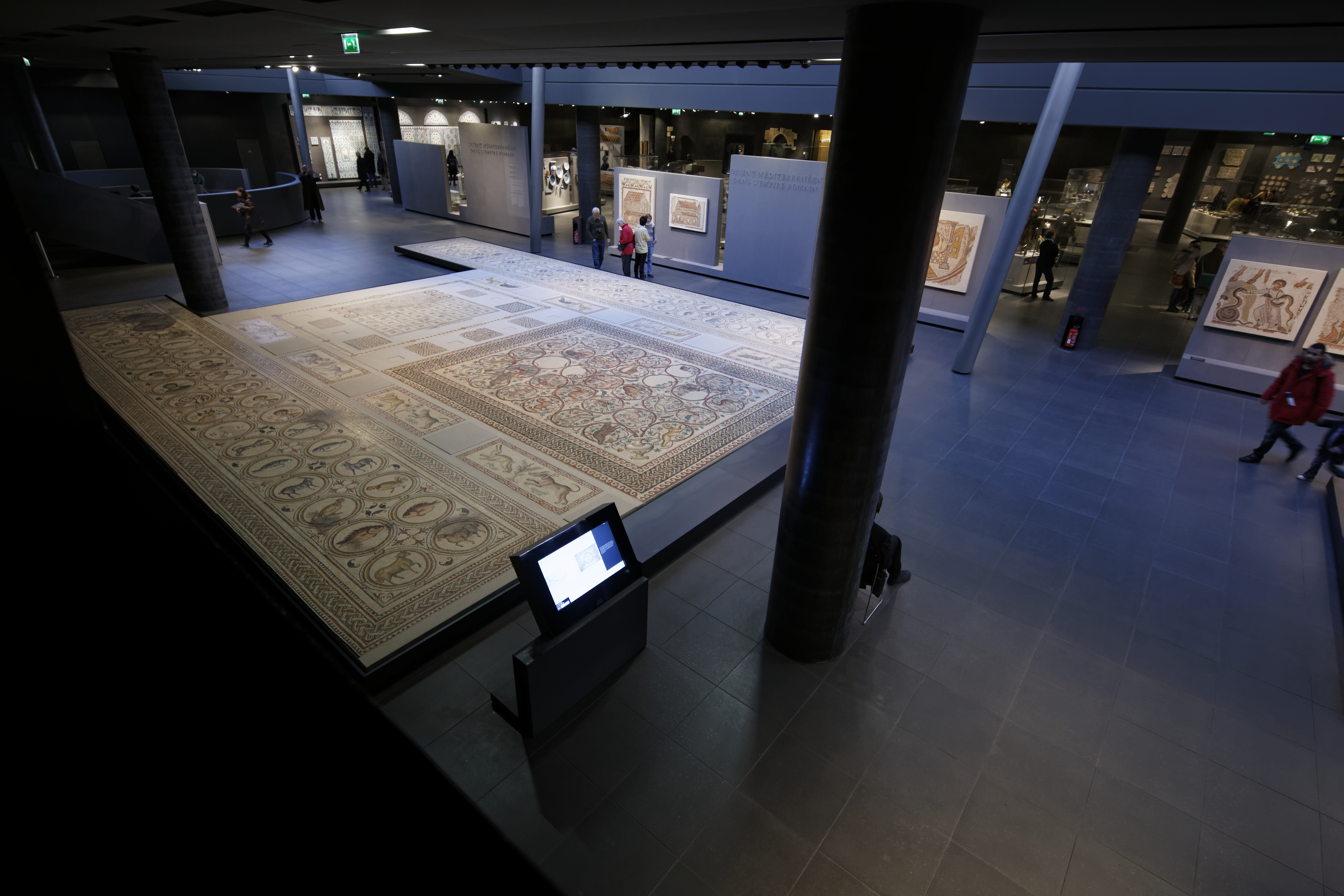
The Kabr Hiram mosaic in Louvre, 2014

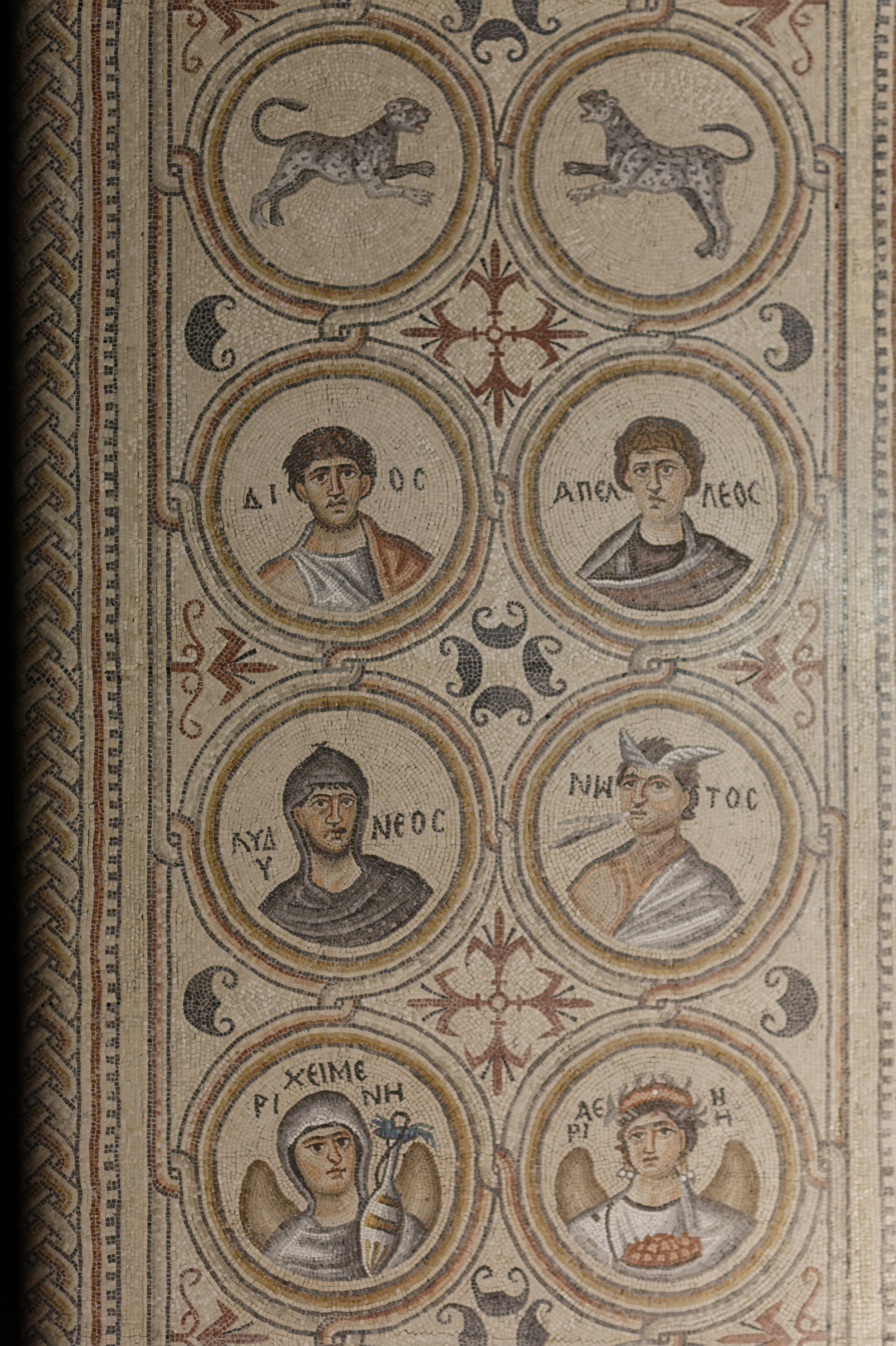
Part of the Kabr Hiram mosaic in Louvre, 2014

== Bibliography ==
- Conder, C.R.; Kitchener, H.H. (1881). The Survey of Western Palestine: Memoirs of the Topography, Orography, Hydrography, and Archaeology. Vol. 1. London: Committee of the Palestine Exploration Fund.
- Guérin, V. (1880). Description Géographique Historique et Archéologique de la Palestine (in French). Vol. 3: Galilee, pt. 2. Paris: L'Imprimerie Nationale.
- Palmer, E.H. (1881). The Survey of Western Palestine: Arabic and English Name Lists Collected During the Survey by Lieutenants Conder and Kitchener, R. E. Transliterated and Explained by E.H. Palmer. Committee of the Palestine Exploration Fund.
- Renan, E. (1864). Mission de Phénicie (in French). Paris: Imprimerie impériale.
- Schumacher, G. (1889). "Sculptured figures near Kana". Quarterly Statement - Palestine Exploration Fund. 21: 259–264.
