= Abd al-Rahim al-Hajj Muhammad =

Palestinian Arab commander (1892–1939)

Abd al-Rahim al-Hajj Muhammad عبد الرحيم الحج محمد
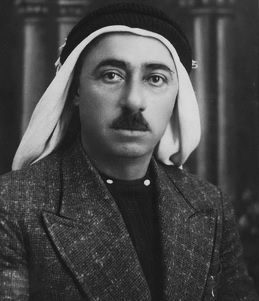
- Portrait, early 1937
- Nickname: Abu Kamal
- Born: 1892; Dhinnaba, Ottoman Empire
- Died: March 1939 (aged 46–47) Sanur, Mandatory Palestine
- Allegiance: Ottoman Empire (Kingdom of Hejaz) Arab Higher Committee
- Conflicts: World War I Arab revolt in Palestine †

Abd al-Rahim al-Hajj Muhammad Al Saif (Arabic: عبد الرحيم الحج محمد ال سيف; 1892 – March 1939), also known by his kunya Abu Kamal, was a prominent Palestinian Arab commander of rebel forces during the 1936–39 Arab revolt against British Mandate rule and increased levels of Jewish settlement in Palestine. Most of his activities were based in the areas of Tulkarm, Nablus and Jenin (modern-day northern West Bank). In September 1938, he became the General Commander of the Revolt, although he shared the post in rotation with Arif Abd al-Raziq. In February 1939, al-Hajj Muhammad was given sole title to the post by the revolt's political leadership, but was killed the following month in a fire-fight with British forces.

== Early life ==
Al-Hajj Muhammad was born in the village of Dhinnaba (today a neighborhood of Tulkarm city) in 1892. He belonged to the landowning clan of Samara, itself a part of the larger tribal confederation of al-Barqawi, which had a long history of activity in the area of Tulkarm. During the invasion of Syria by Napoleon Bonaparte in 1798–99, al-Hajj Muhammad's great-grandfather fought in the Ottoman defense of the country, but was later sentenced to death. Another of his great-grandfathers participated in the 1834 peasants' revolt against Ibrahim Pasha's rule in Palestine.

Al-Hajj Muhammad was initially educated in Dhinnaba's kuttab, a traditional elementary school. In 1899–1900 he was enrolled in a primary school in Tulkarm. Later, he worked the fields of his lands alongside his father and occasionally traveled with him from place to place, selling their agricultural products. During World War I (1914–18) he was conscripted into the Ottoman army (a requirement for male Ottoman citizens), and posted outside of Palestine in Tripoli and Beirut. He returned following the Ottomans' defeat by British forces and their Hashemite Arab allies. His father had died sometime during the war. In 1920 Britain, which had already been in control of the area, established a mandate over Palestine under the auspices of the League of Nations.

== Career during British rule ==
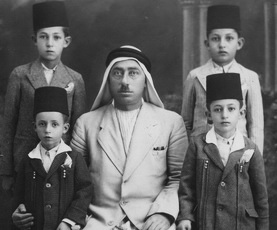
Al-Hajj Muhammad and his four sons, Kamal (the eldest), Abd al-Jawad, Abd al-Karim and Jawdat in Damascus, early 1937

Upon his return to Palestine in 1918, al-Hajj Muhammad supervised his family's land possessions. He became one of the prominent local grain traders of Palestine during the early years of the Mandate. Coinciding with this period, al-Hajj Muhammad became an ardent opponent of Zionism and British support for that movement. The 1920 Nebi Musa riots, unrest in 1923 and the 1929 Palestine riots all extended into Tulkarm and al-Hajj Muhammad was angered at the coercive manner in which the British authorities quelled the Palestinian Arab participants. His business eventually went bankrupt after the Mandate adopted new economic policies that saw the import of cheaper, foreign wheat at the expense of local produce. His disaffection with British economic policies partly motivated his participation in the Palestinian Arab revolt in 1936.

The local connections al-Hajj Muhammad established as a grain merchant became beneficial in his later recruitment efforts. The web of the al-Barqawi's tribal loyalties proved of great value, providing him with fighting men and provisions. During the 1930s, al-Hajj Muhammad set up base in the vicinity of Bal'a, near Tulkarm, and began recruiting and training fighters from the area, including former Ottoman soldiers who brought additional expertise in combat and use of firearms. Under his command, his men launched minor raids against Jewish settlements and British security personnel. One of the main targets were the orange orchards of newly established Jewish settlements in the Wadi al-Hawarith area west of Tulkarm. These places had mostly been built on the lands of absentee landlords and their peasant tenants had been evicted.

Al-Hajj Muhammad had a criminal record with the Mandatory authorities. According to Israeli historian Yehoshua Porath, his alleged crime was committing fraud in a land transaction with a Jewish buyer. However, author and anthropologist Ted Swedenburg wrote Porath's claim was never mentioned by other sources that discussed al-Hajj Muhammad.

In 1934, his wife Badia'a died and al-Hajj Muhammad was left to care for his four sons. With the death of Muslim revivalist preacher and insurgent leader Izz ad-Din al-Qassam in a shootout with the Palestine Police Force, tensions between the Palestinian Arab population, among whom al-Qassam was popular, and the authorities rose significantly. His sympathizers grew in number and the notion of armed struggle against British rule and their sponsorship of Zionism became increasingly popular as an alternative to the diplomatic negotiations between the Palestinian leadership and the British government. The negotiations were ultimately seen by the local population as a futile effort that bore no tangible results. Later, when al-Hajj Muhammad actively took part in the revolt, he entrusted his children with his sister Halima, a widow. According to his eldest son Kamal, she too was a grain merchant, who later traded in textiles. She also financially supported the children's education. Al-Hajj Muhammad normally met his sons for one or two days a week in different villages. His children would be escorted to his location by one of al-Hajj Muhammad's soldiers.

== Commander in the revolt ==
=== Early stage ===
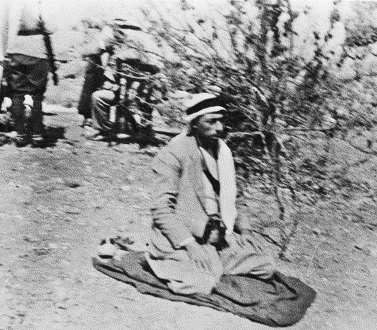
Al-Hajj Muhammad praying with his fighters behind him, 1936

The revolt started in Nablus with the Palestinian general strike in April 1936. The strike spread to a number of cities throughout Palestine, including Tulkarm where al-Hajj Muhammad helped organize the campaign. By the summer of that year, several Palestinian Arab rebel bands had sprung up, including the forces of al-Hajj Muhammad. The latter used existing social networks and the complex web of local clan politics to build alliances both with the middle classes of the major towns, particularly the well-educated activists, and the rural clan elders to build a solid base of resistance among the Muslim populace. In order to avoid detection, al-Hajj Muhammad refrained from commanding a large unit of troops. Instead, he raised small, semi-permanent bands of volunteers called fasa'il (sing. fasl) as he moved from one area to another. They normally launched night time attacks against specific targets.

In the earliest stage of the revolt, in the early summer, al-Hajj Muhammad's fighters primarily operated in the Wadi al-Sha'ir area between Nablus and the coastal plain. Most of their actions consisted of attacks against British Army and police patrols between Tulkarm and Nablus. On 21 June 1936, in the Battle of Anabta, al-Hajj Muhammad and his fasa'il ambushed a British Army force protecting a Jewish convoy passing near the village. Three British bomber planes were dispatched to aid the ambushed convoy. The ensuing battle lasted about seven hours and ended with the deaths of 10 rebels and 2 British soldiers. A further 21 rebels and two British soldiers were wounded. The authorities consequently issued an arrest warrant for al-Hajj Muhammad.

The rebel bands had worked independently of each other until July, when al-Hajj Muhammad, Arif Abd al-Raziq and Fakhri Abd al-Hadi decided to coordinate the actions of their respective militias. Abd al-Raziq was based in the Bani Sa'b area around Tayibe, while Abd al-Hadi operated in Sha'ruwiya, around Arraba. All of their areas of operation were concentrated in the north-central highlands. Another meeting between the leaders was held in August to designate official areas of operation and specific targets to attack. The Jerusalem-area militia of Abd al-Qadir al-Husayni was absent from both of these meetings, making it increasingly difficult to form a solid military command among rebels across the country.

The arrival of the well-known Arab nationalist volunteer commander Fawzi al-Qawuqji in August, and his assumption of the rebels' leadership, further damaged the revolt's coherence, despite his attempts to unify rebel ranks. Although al-Qawuqji was an experienced field commander, relations between him and the Palestinian political and military leadership was one of general mistrust. Local rebels resented the delegation of command positions to non-Palestinians and al-Qawuqji's references to the area as "Southern Syria" instead of "Palestine." Nonetheless, al-Hajj Muhammad and al-Qawuqji fought together in a second major confrontation with British forces in Bal'a in September. The battle went on for six hours and according to Mandatory figures, three British military personnel were killed and four wounded. One of the fatalities was a British pilot whose plane was downed by rebels, who suffered ten dead and six wounded.

In October 1936, rebel operations temporarily ceased after the Arab Higher Committee (AHC), the revolt's political leadership, accepted calls by the generally pro-British royals of Jordan, Iraq and Saudi Arabia for a cessation of hostilities. In return, the Arab royals would lobby the British Mandatory authorities to address Palestinian Arab concerns about Zionist activity in Palestine. That month, al-Qawuqji left Palestine. Al-Hajj Muhammad followed suit and headed for Damascus to evade arrest; the British had placed a bounty of 500 pounds on him. While in Damascus, al-Hajj Muhammad raised funds and purchased weapons for the revolt. He also began working with Syrian and Lebanese nationalists to smuggle the arms into Palestine. Al-Hajj Muhammad later left Damascus for the Lebanese mountain village of Qarnayel east of Beirut. From there, he maintained regular communications with his forces.

=== Renewal of rebellion ===
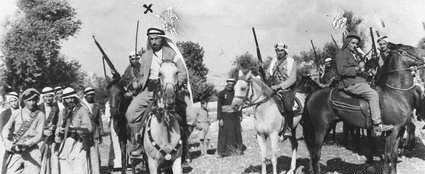
Al-Hajj Muhammad on horseback (beneath the "x" mark) with his fasa'il outside Kafr Sur. To his left on the brown horse is commander Abd al-Rahman al-Hattab and behind and to al-Hattab's left is Maarouf Saad, a volunteer and future parliamentarian of Sidon, Lebanon

While fighting was on hold, the British government announced it would not restrict Jewish immigration to Palestine and instead proposed a partition of Palestine into separate Jewish and Arab states as put forward by the Peel Commission (November 1936–January 1937.) These moves antagonized the Palestinian leadership whose principal concern was increased Jewish settlement. Thus, they boycotted the commission from the time it began its work. The AHC under the chairmanship of Amin al-Husayni, the Grand Mufti of Jerusalem, requested rebel leaders return and resume military activities in Palestine to pressure the authorities. To that end, al-Hajj Muhammad returned to Palestine in April to command his fasa'il in the Tulkarm-Jenin-Nablus region, which was referred to by the authorities as the "Triangle of Terror" due to the concentration of rebel activity in the area.

With the renewal of the revolt, efforts were made to unify rebel ranks and establish a hierarchical command structure. In late 1937, al-Hajj Muhammad summoned the village elders in Tulkarm's vicinity and requested that they each provide him with one armed man. He was generally successful and recruited a 50-man force. The last quarter of the year saw increased attacks against British military targets, buses carrying Jews, the Iraqi Petroleum Company pipeline in Palestine and telecommunication lines. By this stage, the revolt had developed into an organized effort across Palestine, with each area's fasa'il having a hierarchy of some sort. In the case of al-Hajj Muhammad's forces, there were four brigades, each led by a commander and with designated funds. Al-Hajj Muhammad appointed Ahmad Massad as his deputy to whom the other commanders were subordinate. This military order contrasted with the early phase of the revolt where al-Hajj Muhammad had been the sole field commander.

During a confrontation between rebels and British forces at the village of an-Nazla ash-Sharqiya in early December 1937, al-Hajj Muhammad was wounded, but managed to evade capture when the mukhtar (village headman) escorted him to safety in a nearby cave. Four of al-Hajj Muhammad's men died in the battle. After the British withdrew from the area, al-Hajj Muhammad was treated by local doctors until January 1938 when he received more advanced care in Damascus. He returned to Palestine later that month. By early 1938, the rebels consolidated control over much of the countryside and the rural roads. These areas became increasingly dangerous for British forces, who were mostly concentrated in the main towns.

=== General commander ===
Local rebel commanders were generally suspicious of outside Arab military leaders, such as al-Qawuqji, and of the AHC, particularly after many members of the latter joined the Damascus-based Central Committee of Jihad following the AHC's dissolution by the authorities in October 1937. The Central Committee had been founded in late 1937 by Izzat Darwaza, and officially served as the revolt's political leadership, fund-raising body and arms supplier. On the ground in Palestine, competition for the role of the rebels' general command became increasingly tense between al-Hajj Muhammad and Abd al-Raziq. They engaged in a serious rivalry, which coincided with acrimonious relations between their families over their influence in the Tulkarm area's social and political spheres.

To smooth over differences, the revolt's leaders held a summit in Deir Ghassaneh in September 1938 and established the Bureau of the Arab Revolt in Palestine as the armed body of the Central Committee, with al-Hajj Muhammad and Abd al-Raziq rotating as general commander. The other two commanders on the Bureau were Abu Ibrahim al-Kabir of the Upper Galilee and Yusuf Abu Durra of the Haifa-Wadi Ara region. The British Army, backed by bomber planes, assaulted Deir Ghassaneh after gaining knowledge of the meeting, and sought to arrest or kill the commanders. A battle ensued in which a prominent commander, Muhammad al-Salih (known as Abu Khalid) was slain. Despite the Bureau's formation, the rivalry between al-Hajj Muhammad and Abd al-Raziq continued and undermined its purpose.

The Central Committee settled the leadership dispute when it conferred the title of general commander solely to al-Hajj Muhammad in February 1939. He was already in Damascus at the time, having moved back in October 1938. Al-Hajj Muhammad was also given an assurance of support after tensions between him and the Central Committee resulted in the latter's withholding of supplies and funding to al-Hajj Muhammad at one point in 1938. The rebellion was also entering a new stage with the establishment of British-sponsored and Zionist-supported anti-rebel forces known as "peace bands". They were commanded by al-Husayni's political rivals, chief among them the Nashashibi clan, and launched counter-attacks against rebel forces and a campaign to harass rebel sympathizers and pressure local leaders to end the revolt.

== Death and legacy ==
In late March 1939, on his return to Palestine after being officially confirmed as the rebellion's general commander, al-Hajj Muhammad was killed by the British Army in the village of Sanur, located between Jenin and Nablus. He had entered the village with two of his subordinate commanders and a few of his fighters. A peace band set up by Farid Irsheid had been carrying out surveillance of him. Irsheid had sought revenge for the killing of his brothers Ahmad and Muhammad in May 1938, which were generally attributed to al-Hajj Muhammad. The information Irsheid's band of informants collected on al-Hajj Muhammad's movements were then passed onto British intelligence. A large force from the British Army subsequently arrived at Sanur and sealed off the village. Irsheid's band served alongside the army unit. The village's residents had reportedly pleaded with al-Hajj Muhammad to escape from Sanur undercover, but he and his fighters entered the adjacent Marj Sanur plain and clashed with British troops. Al-Hajj Muhammad was killed in the fire-fight along with one of his deputy commanders. According to some residents who witnessed the clash, the British officer who headed the operation, Geoffrey Morton, removed his hat and covered al-Hajj Muhammad's face with a handkerchief in a sign of respect. Morton later wrote "Abdul Rahim had a special respect among his people, and among us."

Al-Hajj Muhammad was buried in Sanur, but two weeks later members of his fasa'il exhumed his body and transported it to Dhinnaba. There, he was buried in a ceremonial manner "befitting his stature in the revolt," according to author Sonia Nimr. As news of his death spread, a general strike was held throughout Palestine for a number of days in honor of al-Hajj Muhammad's efforts in the anti-colonial and anti-Zionist struggle. His death made the headlines of various newspapers in Palestine and other parts of the Arab world.

Al-Hajj Muhammad's native village commemorates his death annually in March and the 70th anniversary of his death was also honored by Tulkarm's (Jewish-founded) Kadoorie Institute in March 2009. A boys' school in Dhinnaba is named after al-Hajj Muhammad as is a major street in Amman, Jordan.

According to historian Hillel Frisch, al-Hajj Muhammad's death was a "reflection of how much the rebels were then bereft of an area that could serve as a sanctuary or from which they could renew operations." The revolt had largely dissipated by the time al-Hajj Muhammad was killed, his demise being a significant blow. He was succeeded by Ahmad al-Hasan, but the latter was unable to maintain the momentum of the revolt, which ended in late 1939.

== Ideology and relationship with the Central Committee ==
According to Swedenburg, al-Hajj Muhammad was the "most respected commander, [and] was renowned for his nationalist convictions, for his opposition to political assassination, and for his tirelessness as a fighter". He operated more or less independently from the political leadership of the rebellion, including those based in Palestine, such as al-Husayni, and the Damascus-based Central Committee. Despite his tacit alliance with al-Husayni, al-Hajj Muhammad had refused to assassinate local leaders who were rivals against the al-Husayni family for political power, once remarking "I don't work for Husayniya ("Husanyni-ism"), but for wataniya (patriotism)."

Political assassinations, attempted or successful, commonly occurred throughout the revolt. Al-Hajj Muhammad's refusal to participate did not seriously damage his relations with al-Husayni or the Central Committee, an organization which he depended on for war materiel. He went frequently to Damascus to obtain weapons and supplies as well as to discuss the situation in Palestine. However, an intelligence document from the British Mandatory authorities revealed that al-Hajj Muhammad left Palestine for Syria in October 1938 after becoming disaffected with the Central Committee's activities. The report states that he refused to send funds to the Committee, remarking "The shoe of the most insignificant mujahid (fighter) is nobler than all the members of the Society, who have indulged in pleasure, while their brethren suffer in the mountains."

At one point, tensions emanating from al-Hajj Muhammad's refusal to carry out the killings of several men provided to him in a hit list by Da'ud al-Husayni on behalf of the Committee resulted in the cutting off of financial and material support for a certain period of time in 1938. This forced al-Hajj Muhammad to go to Jerusalem's chamber of commerce and the Ramallah municipality for funds. Another reason for his departure was the increased presence of informants within rebel ranks, making it hard for him to continue military activities.

His personal assistant Abu Shahir depicted al-Hajj Muhammad as a "genuine nationalist," in contrast to the self-proclaimed nationalist leaders whom Abu Shahir accused of adhering to "narrow factional interests". He claimed that al-Hajj Muhammad saw Palestinian unity as being all-inclusive and incompatible with political assassinations, particularly killings that would fuel divisions within the ranks of the rebellion's leadership. A possible exception to his anti-assassination policy was his alleged responsibility for the killings of Ahmad and Muhammad Irsheid, landowners who supported Nashashibi-led opposition to al-Husayni's leadership. Because of the widely disputed circumstances surrounding the Irsheids' deaths and its general attribution to al-Hajj Muhammad, the killings were rarely mentioned in Palestinian narratives of the revolt.

== Bibliography ==
- Cohen, Hillel (2009). Army of Shadows: Palestinian Collaboration With Zionism, 1917–1948. University of California Press. ISBN 978-0520933989.
- Frisch, Hillel (2008). The Palestinian Military: Between Militias and Armies. Routledge. ISBN 978-0203929070.
- Great Britain and the East. Vol. 53. Great Britain and the East, Limited. 1939.
- Kessler, Oren (2023). Palestine 1936: The Great Revolt and the Roots of the Middle East Conflict. Lanham MD: Rowman & Littlefield. ISBN 978-1538148808.
- Nafi, Basheer M. (1998). Arabism, Islamism and the Palestine Question, 1908–1941: A Political History. Garnet & Ithaca Press. ISBN 0863722350.
- Nimr, Sonia (2012). ""A Nation in a Hero: Abdul Rahim al-Hajj Mohammad and the Arab Revolt"". In Mark Andrew LeVine (ed.). Struggle and Survival in Palestine/Israel. University of California Press. ISBN 978-0520262539.
- Swedenburg, Ted (1988). "Palestinian Peasantry in the Great Revolt". In Edmund Burke (ed.). Islam, Politics, and Social Movements. University of California Press. ISBN 0520068688.
- Swedenburg, Ted (2003). Memories of Revolt: The 1936–1939 Rebellion and the Palestinian National Past. University of Arkansas Press. ISBN 1610752635.
- Thomas, Martin (2008). Empires of Intelligence: Security Services and Colonial Disorder After 1914. University of California Press. ISBN 978-0520933743.
