= Ibrahim Nassar =

Ibrahim Nassar إبراهيم نصار
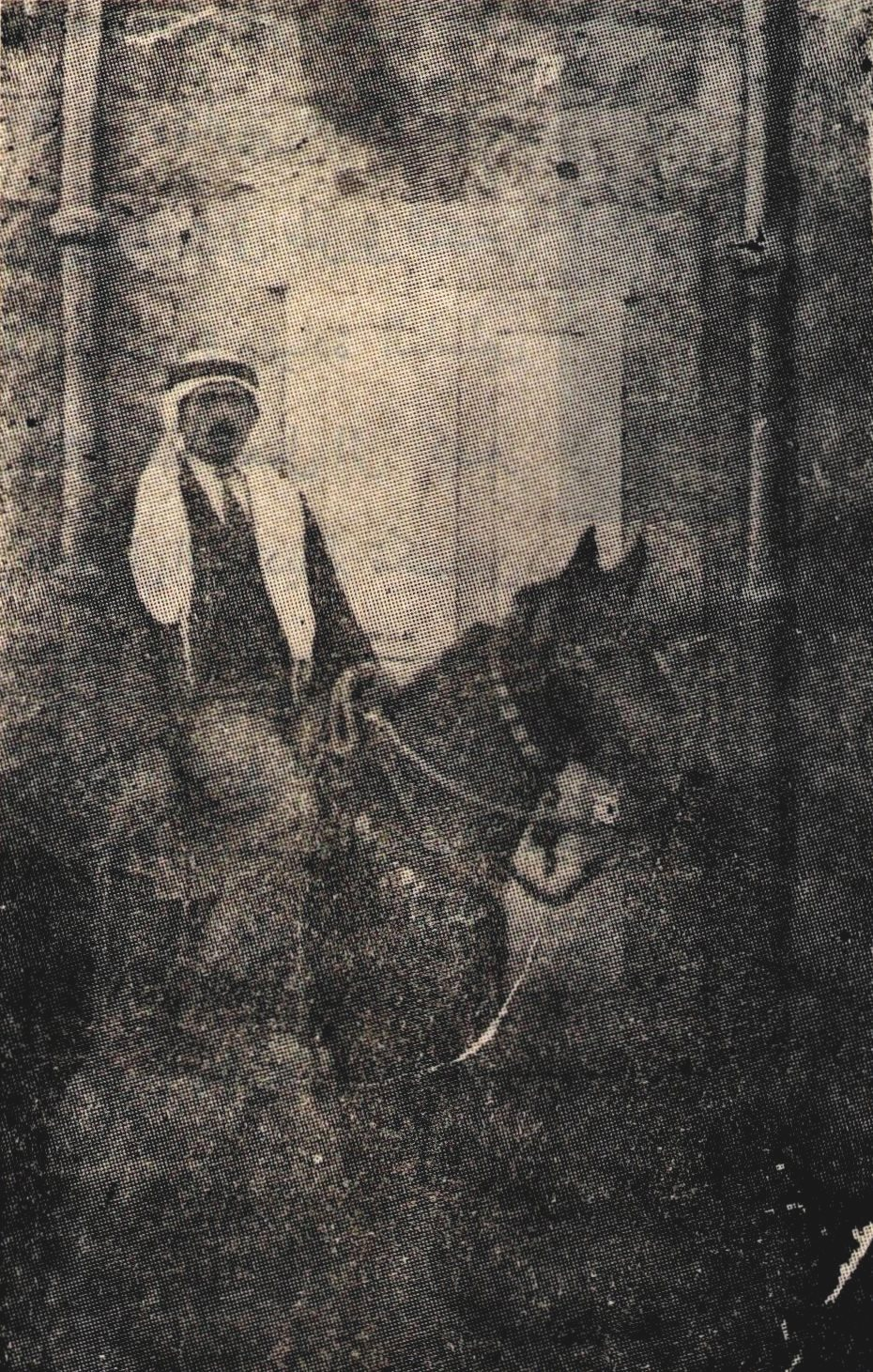
- Ibrahim in 1929.

Personal details
- Born: 1895 Anabta, Ottoman Empire
- Died: 1985 (aged 89–90) Anabta, Palestine
- Party: Youth Congress Party
- Other political affiliations: National Liberation League in Palestine (from 1946); Arab Nationalist Movement
- Relations: Abd al-Rahim Mahmud (son-in-law); Al-Tayib Abd al-Rahim (grandson)
- Children: Mahfuda; Muhammad Amin
- Parent: Sheik Muhammad Nassar
- Occupation: Arab nationalist political activist

Ibrahim Nassar (Arabic: إبراهيم نصار; 1895–1985) was an Arab Palestinian rebel commander and politician.

== Life ==
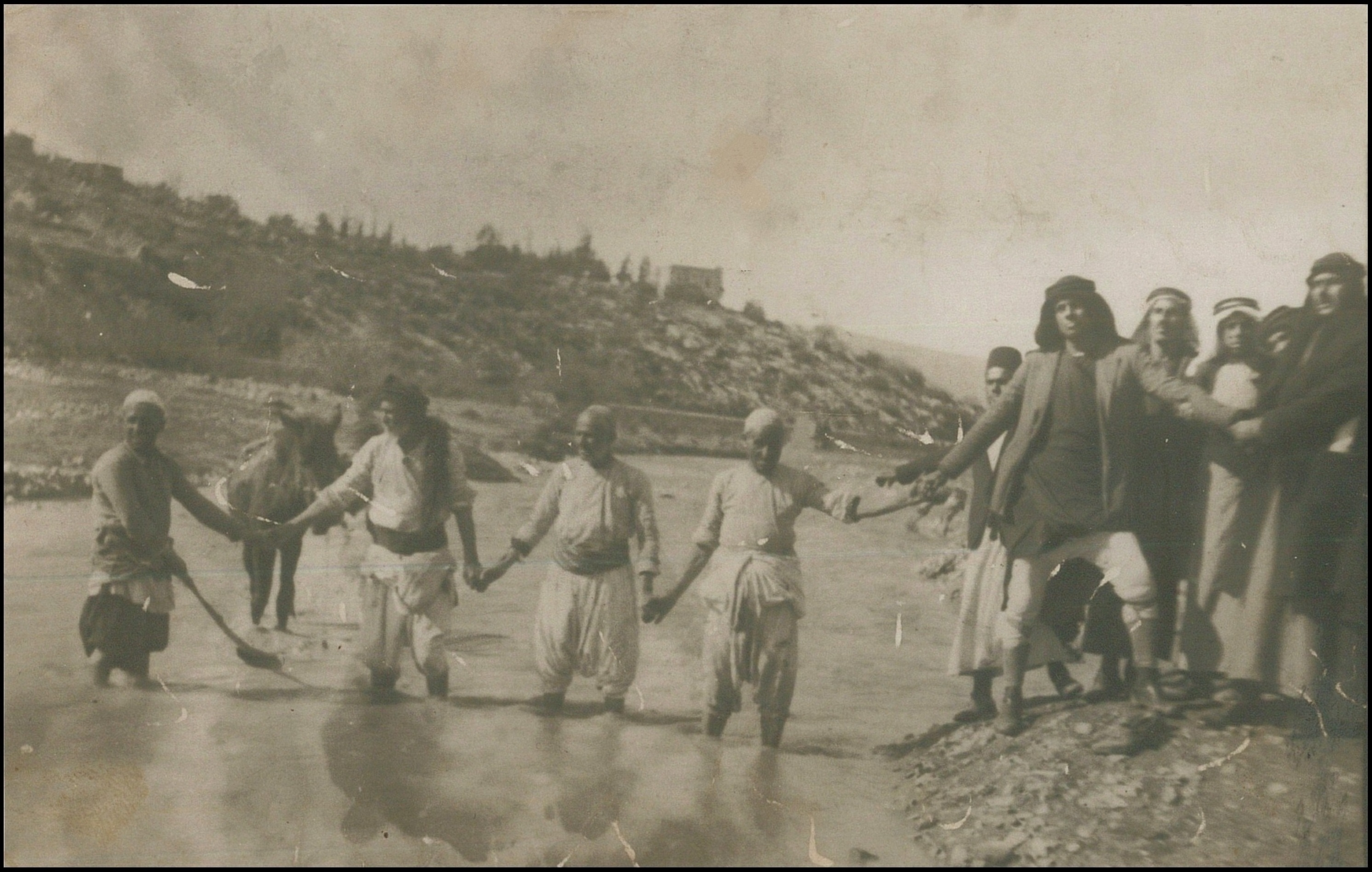
Ibrahim Nassar, far right of the photo, the photo was taken in February 1935 during a flood that hit the village (Anabta).

Ibrahim Muhammad Nassar Abd al-Rahman Abd al-Rahim al-Ismail was born in the town of Anabta, Ibrahim received his primary and secondary education in Beirut, graduating in 1912. He then enrolled at Al-Azhar University in Cairo and graduated in 1914. During World War I (1914–1918), he joined the Military Academy in Istanbul, and was appointed an officer in the Ottoman army. However, in mid-1916 he defected and participated in the Arab Revolt against Ottoman rule. Ibrahim fought on the front of the Hejaz to Aqaba, and on the front east of the Jordan River to the city of Daraa.

Ibrahim Nassar worked as a teacher at the directorate of the Hittin school in Tiberias for five years, then in Al-Khalisa School in Safad for two years, and then in Ein Mahil in Nazareth for two years between 1922 and 1931, Where the knowledge management of the British Mandate government ended his service in the wake of his political and cultural activity and his participation in writing in the local Arab newspapers and his attempts to challenge the existing education curriculum.

In 1932 Ibrahim joined the Youth Congress Party and was responsible for the Office of the Executive Committee at the second conference in 1935. He delivered a welcome speech to receive Prince Saud bin Abdul Aziz, while he passed through the town of Anabta on his way to Jerusalem.

Ibrahim joined the 1936–39 Arab revolt in Palestine, fighting in the area east of Tulkarm. He formed a group of rebels based in Anabta and when the leader Fawzi al-Qawuqji arrived in Palestine in late August 1936, Ibrahim took part in a meeting of rebel leaders. He fought in the Battle of Anabta near Tulkarm in June and in the battle of Bal'a in September, led by Qawuqji. Ibrahim also participated in the battles of Jaba, Beit Imrin and Kafr Sur. During the revolt, he served as a member of the Finance Committee set up by Qawuqji, which consisted of prominent rebel leaders.

Ibrahim Nassar died in 1985 at the age of 90.

== Family ==
His daughter, Mahfouda, married Palestinian poet Abdul Rahim Mahmud and he is the grandfather through her of Palestinian politician Al Tayeb Abdul Rahim. Ibrahim Nassar also had a son, Mohammad.

== See also ==
- Abd al-Rahim al-Hajj Muhammad
- Farhan al-Sa'di
