= Battle of Balaa =

- Part of 1936–1939 Arab revolt in Palestine
Date	3 September 1936
Location	Bal'a, Mandatory Palestine
Result	Rebel withdrawal: The British claim victory

Belligerents
United Kingdom	Palestinian Arabs

Commanders and leaders
(United Kingdom) J. V. Faviell (WIA)	Fawzi al-Qawuqji

Units involved
British Army: Royal Lincolnshire Regiment; "A" Company; "C" Company; Royal Scots Fusiliers	Transjordanians; Syrian volunteers

Casualties and losses
3 killed 5 wounded 2 aircraft shot down	8+ killed

The Battle of Balaa took place on 3 September 1936, when Arab rebels ambushed a detachment of the British Army's Royal Lincolnshire Regiment near the village of Bal'a. The rebels, mostly well-disciplined and well-equipped Transjordanian and Syrian volunteers under Fawzi al-Qawuqji, put up a determined fight, killing at least 3 British soldiers and destroying two planes. In the end, the Arab militants retreated after an 8-hour firefight, with the British Army claiming victory.
