= Arif Abd al-Raziq =

Palestinian revolution leader (1894–1944)

- عارف عبد الرازق
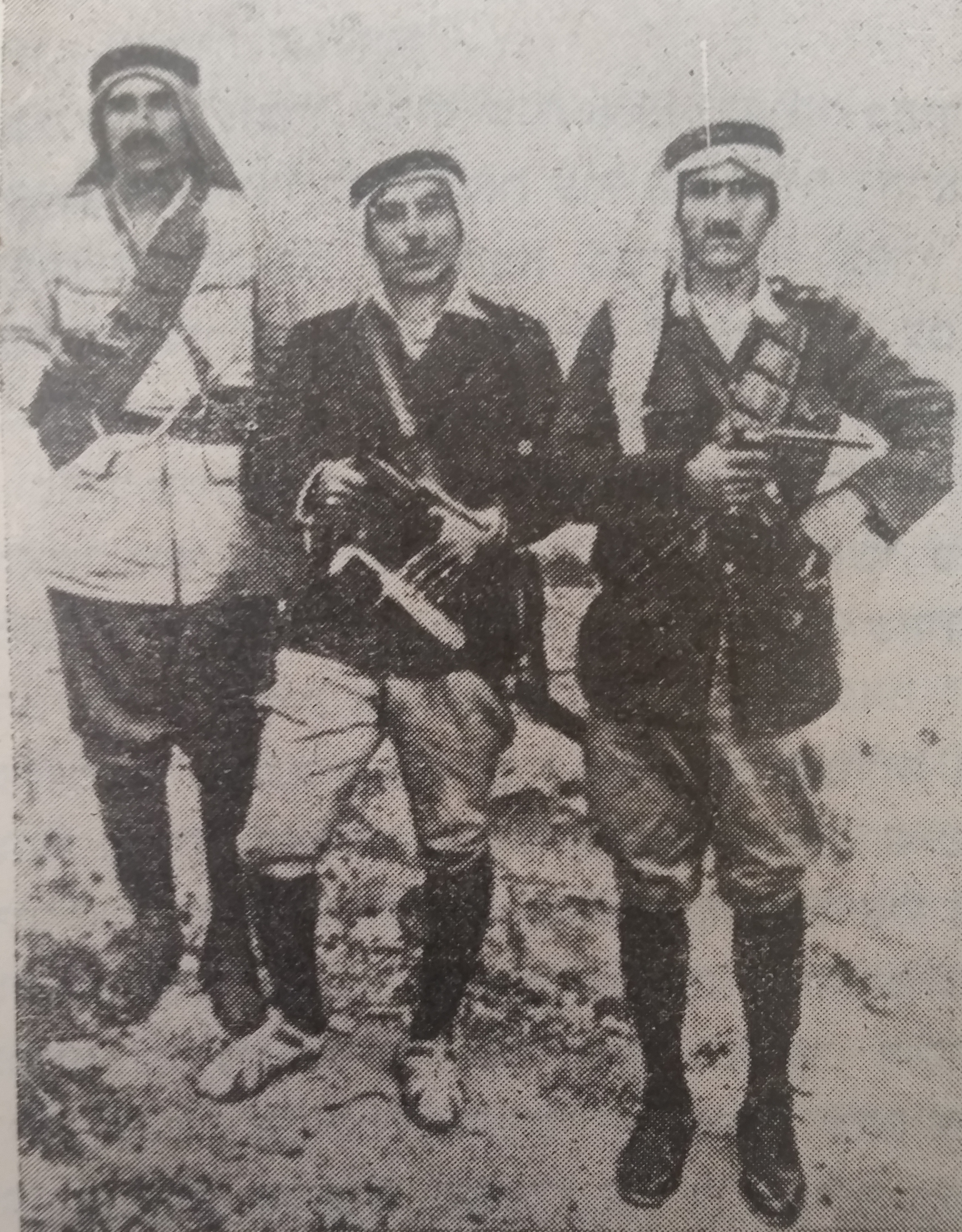
- Commander Arif Abd al-Raziq (center) with his two deputies, 1938
- Born: 1894; Taybeh, Ottoman Empire
- Died: 1944 (aged 49–50); Bulgaria
- Other name: Aref Abdul Razzik
- Children: 5
- Military career
- Conflicts: 1936–1939 Arab revolt in Palestine

Arif Abd al-Raziq (born in Tulkarem, 1894, died in Bulgaria 1944) was one of the Palestinian leaders of the 1936–1939 Arab revolt in Palestine. He was one of the first commanders of the uprising in 1936 and served as a regional commander. After the uprising resumed in 1937, he competed with the considered commander-in-chief, Abd al-Rahim al-Hajj Muhammad, for the title of "General Commander of the Uprising".

== Biography ==
=== Until the Great Arab Revolt ===
Arif Abd al-Raziq was a resident of the village of Taiba and its relatives and a protege of the al-Hajj Ibrahim family, one of the important families of Tulkarm, which originated from Taiba. From a young age he was active in the Arab national movement and supported Pan-Arabism and the creation of an independent Arab state in Greater Syria. In 1921 he participated in the riots in Jaffa (the events of 1921) and was arrested. From 1923 he was a highwayman and was sentenced to three years in prison for this. After serving his sentence, he worked as a police informant and land broker. In this work, he arranged the sale of a large part of the land in Taiba to the Jews. In the first half of the 1930s, he participated in the activities of the "Youth Conference" party which was organised by the Arab Scouts.

=== In the early stages of the uprising (1936) ===
Abd al-Raziq was one of the first commanders of the Great Arab Revolt of 1936 and the main commander in the Tulkarm region. He was among the organizers of the groups that gradually became the main commanders in their areas of residence, and the area under his command was the Bani Sa'ab district, south of Tulkarm. He established a hierarchical structure in his area, in which he was the supreme commander of eight groups under the command of eight deputy commanders. At the end of July 1936, Abd al-Raziq met near Tubas with his fellow commanders in Samaria, Fakhri Abd al-Hadi of Maraba and Abdullah al-Biruti of Makraba. At this meeting, the first attempt was made to coordinate between the various rebel groups, but it apparently failed. After Fawzi al-Qawuqji's arrival in Palestine, he met in early September with six commanders of large rebel groups, including Abd al-Raziq, and received from them a signed statement recognizing him as the main commander of the rebellion. Along with the other important commanders, Abd al-Raziq was a member of the seven-member committee to which Qawuqji had assigned responsibility for the task of collecting funds. However, in October 1936, with the end of the general strike, Qawuqji's forces left Palestine, and as a result, the command structure he had established collapsed.

=== After the renewal of the uprising (1937–1939) ===
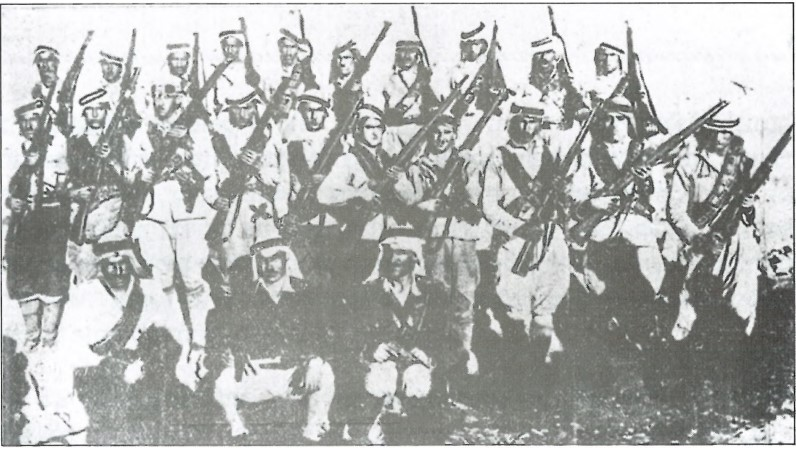
The Great Arab Revolt - An elite unit under the command of Arif Abd al-Raziq

In October 1937, the uprising resumed, but without the organizational infrastructure it had at the beginning, due to the exile and imprisonment of most members of the national bodies. A new rebel headquarters was established in Damascus, called the "Central Committee of National Jihad in Palestine." It operated under the instructions of the head of the Arab Supreme Committee, Amin al-Husseini, from the fall of 1937 until the end of the revolt. Abd al-Raziq received a monthly stipend of 600–800 Palestine pounds from him, which allowed for the payment of monthly salaries to full-time rebels. During 1938, the rebel command structure was redesigned, based on the format of 1936.

In the fall of 1938, after the "Central Committee" failed to appoint an external commander-in-chief for the revolt, the rebel commanders initiated the establishment of the "Ministry of the Arab Revolt in Palestine", which was composed of regional commanders including Abd al-Raziq, and it was agreed that each of them would serve as head of the ministry in turn. However, the ministry failed to act as a supreme military command and its members remained independent. Despite their underground activities, but out of a desire to gain status, the rebel commanders found interest in uniforms and ranks. Abd al-Raziq's rank insignia was two stars and a crown.

Abd al-Raziq wrote printed political leaflets in Hebrew and ordered the Communist Party to distribute them in Jewish communities.

=== The rivalry with Abd al-Rahim al-Hajj Muhammad ===
Despite the agreement to rotate the leadership of the ministry, two commanders competed for the position: Abd al-Rahim al-Hajj Muhammad and Abd al-Raziq. The fierce competition between them had a family background (the two families to which they were close were competing with each other for leadership in Tulkarm), regional and political. Hajj Muhammad opposed Abd al-Raziq's political assassinations for Amin al-Husseini, his "elimination of traitors" and his extortion of funds and sending them to his brothers in Beirut. Abd al-Raziq and his men murdered Farid Hamdallah, a relative of Hajj Muhammad, on suspicion that he had provided information to the authorities. Pressure on Hajj Muhammad from the relatives of the murdered man to avenge his blood led to clashes between the two groups, but the conflict did not escalate into a bloody war.

Hajj Muhammad supported the establishment of a general council of the rebellion, consisting of the commanders of the important factions. Abd al-Raziq agreed to support this, provided that the council was strong and would supervise the commanders. Hajj Muhammad wanted this council to confirm his status as the general commander of the rebellion (starting in the spring of 1938), but Abd al-Raziq opposed this. In July of that year, he acknowledged his subservient status compared to that of Hajj Muhammad, but later claimed that there was no need for another commander-in-chief besides the headquarters in Damascus. Hajj Muhammad then called himself "the general commander of the Arab rebels in Palestine," while Abd al-Raziq called himself "the general commander of the rebels in southern Syria." His choice of the term "Southern Syria," which originated in 1919–1920, instead of "Palestine," probably reflected the support he received from the leadership of the rebellion in Damascus, which was also expressed in greater financial assistance than that received by his opponent.

Both sides asked Muhammad al-Saleh to mediate between them, and on September 13, 1938, he held a meeting between the rebel leaders in Deir Ghassana, northwest of Ramallah. The commanders, who distrusted each other, came to the meeting with their men and guards, but no agreement was reached. The British army became aware of the meeting, and their Air Force carried out an airstrike on the gathering. Many were killed, including the organizer of the meeting themselves.

=== Struggle with the peace squads ===
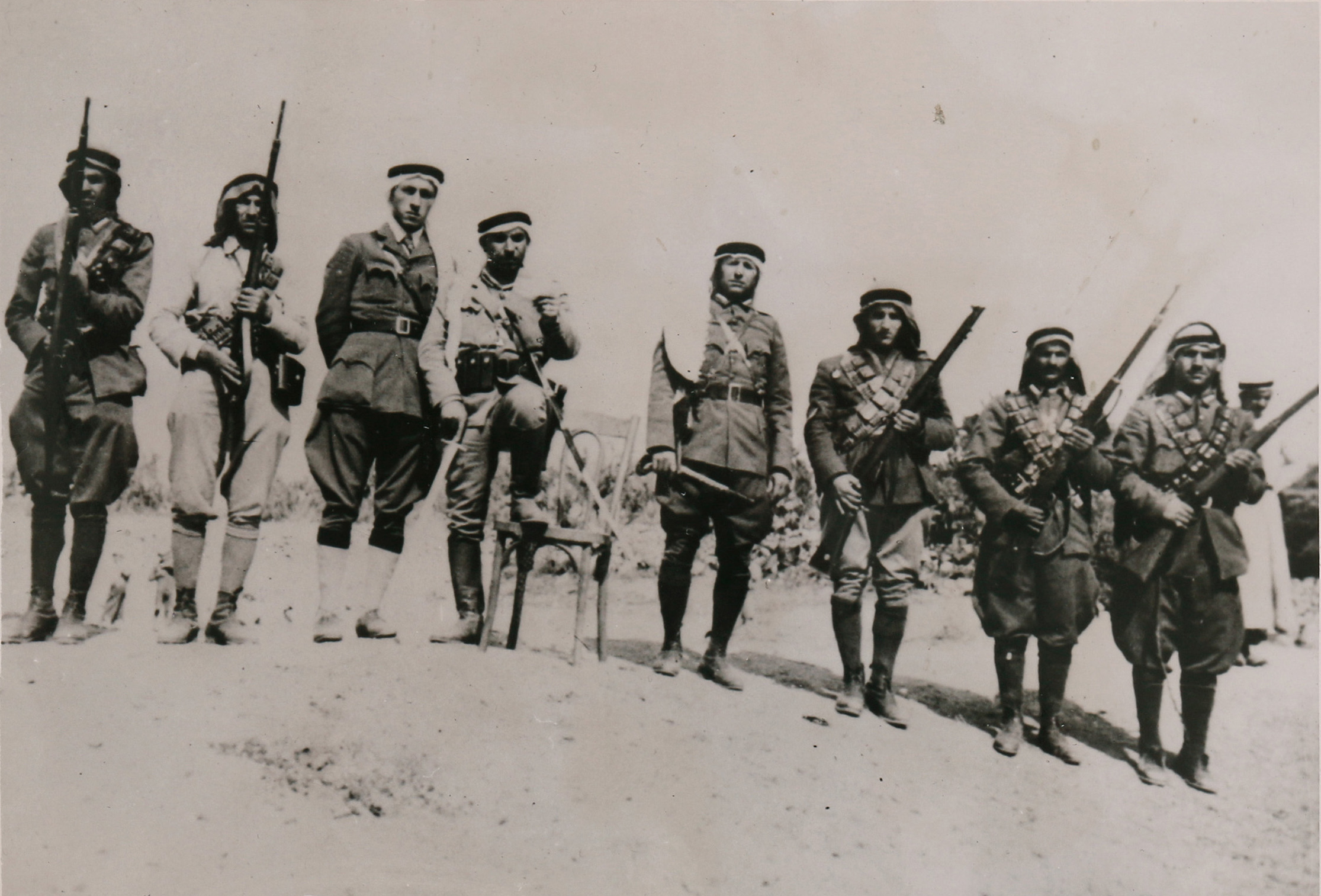
A group of rebels with their commander, Abd al-Raziq, December 9, 1938.

In July 1938, Fakhri Nashashibi held a meeting in Jerusalem with the participation of the dignitaries of the surrounding villages, at which he called on them not to surrender to the rebels and encouraged them to form an armed group to fight the "terrorists of the Mufti," Amin al-Husseini. The dignitaries began to implement the proposal, but in August, Abd al-Raziq published in the weekly bulletin of the "Rebel Command in Southern Syria" that a "punitive unit" had been sent to some of these villages. However, at the end of September, Fakhri Abd al-Hadi returned to the country, leading a group that fought against the rebel gangs. They successfully pushed the forces under the command of Hajj Muhammad and Abd al-Raziq from the Jenin area southward to the Nablus-Tulkarem region.

This success of Abd al-Hadi led to defections from the rebel gangs. In response to the organization of the "Peace squads" and the publication of leaflets against al-Husseini by Nashashibi, Abd al-Raziq issued a death sentence on him, but Nashashibi did not shy away and continued to call on the public to fight the rebels.

The rebels demanded that the urban population contribute very large sums of money to the rebellion, and Abd al-Raziq was particularly prominent among the rebels who engaged in extorting these funds in Jaffa. Because the rebels stood out in the cities with their rural attire, they ordered the city dwellers to replace the Ottoman tarbush ("fez") with the keffiyeh and aqal that were customary for the villagers. The terror of the rebels caused the entire population to do as they commanded, including Christians. Abd al-Razzaq justified the order by saying that the Turks oppressed the Arabs, while the keffiyeh is an Arab national head covering.

The struggle with the "Peace squads" contributed significantly to the destruction of the rebels' power, but their breakdown was also due to disputes between the rebel leaders. In July 1938, Abd al-Raziq's subordinate, Abu Nujaym al-Shanti, was executed after a quarrel with him. In early November 1938, the military authorities required vehicle users to obtain special military permits. The rebels demanded that the population confiscate these licenses, but reached a compromise agreement with the citrus growers, who would be allowed to stock up on them in exchange for payment to the rebel coffers. Abd al-Raziq supported this compromise, but Yusuf Abu Dura opposed it and the two came into conflict. The rebel leaders in Damascus made an effort to bring order to the factions, and in December 1938 the Central Committee appointed a number of urban intellectuals who were to serve as secretaries alongside the faction commanders, similar to the Soviet politburo members. Two teachers from Jaffa were appointed alongside Abd al-Raziq. However, the attempt to operate the secretaries failed and one of Abd al-Raziq's secretaries was arrested by the police a week after his appointment.

Throughout the uprising, the authorities received information about the rebel members, but starting in the fall of 1938, this phenomenon became widespread and its results were devastating to the uprising. The army managed to inflict severe blows on the rebels and their leaders. Among other things, 12 people from the rebel gang of Abd al-Raziq's deputy were arrested. In January 1939, Abd al-Raziq moved to Damascus along with the other important commanders, including Hajj Muhammad and Abu Dura. However, the Central Committee demanded that the commanders who had fled from the British army return to Palestine, and under threat of having their salaries cut off, they did return during the first months of 1939. However, efforts to renew the rebellion failed to prevent its decline and the commanders failed to prevent the disintegration of the factions.

On March 23, 1939, Hajj Muhammad was killed by the British army and the Central Committee was unable to appoint a commander-in-chief in his place. On April 13, 1939, Abd al-Raziq left Palestine and surrendered himself, along with 12 of his men, to the French authorities in Syria, while he was "in a state of complete physical collapse." The authorities transferred him to Palmyra and placed him under house arrest. In June 1939, opponents of the uprising accused him of their propaganda, claiming that he took with him, upon leaving the country, large sums of money that had been extorted from the population.

=== In exile after the revolt ===
With the help of the efforts of Syrian nationalists, Raziq was released from prison and managed to reach Iraq, where he served as Amin al-Husseini's guard. He was among the most important of the approximately 300 Palestinian exiles who were in Iraq during the Rashid Ali revolt in 1941. With the failure of the uprising in Iraq, he fled to Syria and from there to Turkey. He was among the Palestinians who fled to Nazi Germany and its occupied countries during World War II, and died in Bulgaria in 1944.

== Family ==
Abd al-Raziq left behind three sons and two daughters in Taiba, and his house in the village was destroyed by the British government. In the 1940s, one of his brothers was the manager of the Palestinian "National Bank" branch, and another brother was in exile in Germany.
