= 1938 Tiberias massacre =

Anti-Semitic pogrom during the 1936–1939 Arab Revolt in Palestine

- Part of the 1936–1939 Arab revolt in Palestine
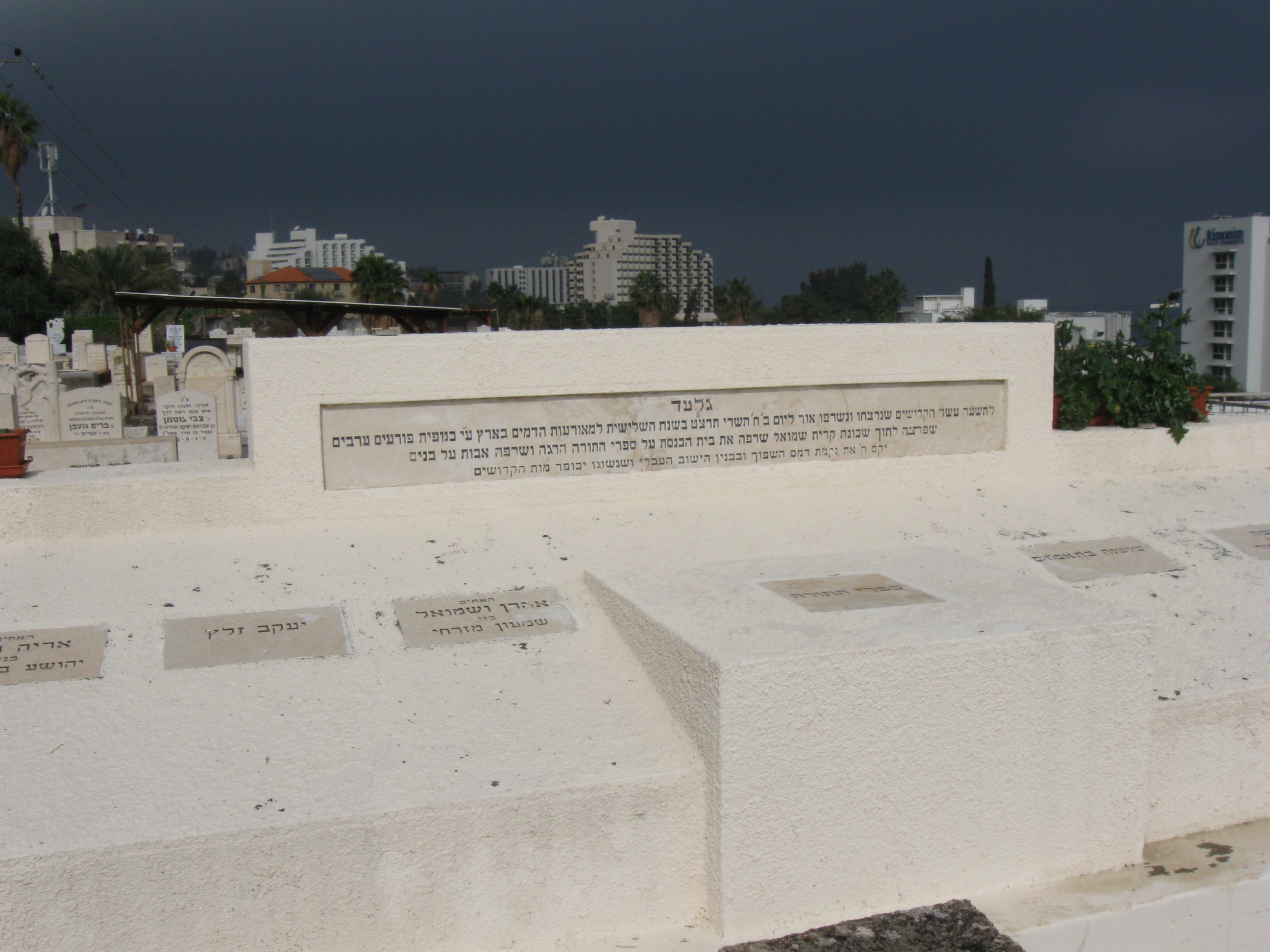
- Memorial and graves of victims in Tiberias' old cemetery
- Native name: הטבח בטבריה
- Location: 32°47′40″N 35°32′00″E; Tiberias, Mandatory Palestine
- Date: 2 October 1938; 88 years ago c. 21:00 pm (UTC+2)
- Target: Jewish Kiryat Shmuel neighbourhood
- Weapons: Stabbing, arson
- Deaths: 19 (including 11 children)
- Victim: Jews
- Perpetrator: Palestinian Arabs: Abu Ibrahim al-Kabir
- No. of participants: 70
- Defender: 15 Jewish guards

The Tiberias massacre took place on 2 October 1938, during the 1936–39 Arab revolt in Tiberias, then located in the British Mandate of Palestine and today located in the State of Israel. The death toll led the incident to be described as the "worst since the Hebron onslaught in 1929".

Attackers entered the city from both north and south, cut communication lines and attacked government buildings, as well as the community's synagogue and homes. After infiltrating the Jewish Kiryat Shmuel neighbourhood, Arab rioters killed 19 Jews in Tiberias, 11 of whom were children. During the massacre, 70 armed Arabs set fire to Jewish homes and the local synagogue. In one house a mother and her five children ages one to twelve were killed, while their father was guarding another part of the city. Families were found shot or stabbed and burned to death. The old beadle in the synagogue was stabbed to death. At the time of the attack there were only 15 Jewish guards in the neighborhood of over 2,000 people. The coast of the Sea of Galilee remained unguarded, for it was the least expected direction for an attack. Two Jewish guards were killed in the attack.

The historian Shai Lachman has attributed the massacre to Abu Ibrahim al-Kabir.

A representative of the British government of the Palestinian Mandate reported that: "It was systematically organized and savagely executed. Of the nineteen Jews killed, including women and children, all save four were stabbed to death. That night and the following day the troops engaged the raiding gangs". After the massacre, the Irgun proposed a joint retaliatory operation with Haganah to deter such events, but the latter group did not agree.

Tiberian Arabs murdered the Jewish mayor, Zaki Alhadif, on 27 October 1938. The Haganah sent a party, led by Yosef Avidar, a Haganah leader who later became a general (Aluf) in the Israel Defense Forces, to investigate the failed defense of the city.

== See also ==
- Hebron massacre
- The Bloody Day in Jaffa
- List of killings and massacres in Mandatory Palestine
