= Yusuf Abu Durra =

Palestinian Arab soldier (1900 – 1940)

- يوسف أبو درة
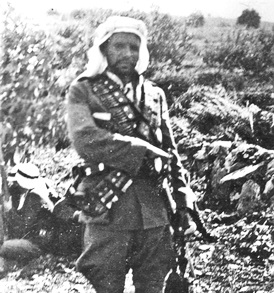
- Abu Durra posing with his rifle, 1936
- Born: 1900; Al-Harithiya, Ottoman Empire
- Died: 18 February 1940 (aged 39/40); Russian Compound, Jerusalem, Mandatory Palestine
- Cause of death: Execution by hanging
- Other name: Abu Abed
- Citizenship: Ottoman Empire; Mandatory Palestine
- Military career
- Allegiance: (Arab Revolt) Black Hand (Arab Revolt) Arab Higher Committee
- Conflicts: 1936–1939 Palestine revolt (executed)

Yusuf Sa'id Abu Durra (Arabic: يوسف سعيد أبو درة, 1900 – 18 February 1940), also known as Abu Abed, was one of the chief Palestinian Arab rebel commanders during the 1936–39 Arab revolt in Palestine. Abu Durra was a close disciple of the Muslim preacher and rebel Izz ad-Din al-Qassam and one of the few survivors of a shootout between British forces and Qassam, in which the latter was killed. When the revolt broke out, Abu Durra led bands of Qassam's remaining disciples and other armed volunteers in the region between Haifa and Jenin. He also administered a rebel court system in his areas of operation, which prosecuted and executed several Palestinian village headmen suspected of colluding with the British authorities. After experiencing battlefield setbacks, Abu Durra escaped to Transjordan, but was arrested on his way back to Palestine in 1939. He was subsequently tried later that year and executed by the authorities in 1940.

== Early life and work ==
Abu Durra was born during the Ottoman era, in 1900, in the village of Silat al-Harithiya, located near Jenin in Jabal Nablus (Samarian highlands). He hailed from the Jaradat clan, which at the time was part of a larger confederation of clans and tribes in Palestine and Transjordan known as the Qais. The Qais also included the Tuqan and Jarrar families, and the Bani Saqr tribe.

During the period when the British administered Palestine, Abu Durra worked as a porter at a railway station in Zikhron Ya'akov. Later, he became a day laborer in the port city of Haifa, working with the Iraqi Petroleum Company.

== Early activism ==
During his time in Haifa, he became a close disciple of the Muslim revivalist preacher and anti-British rebel Izz ad-Din al-Qassam. As part of his efforts against British rule, Abu Durra actively sought recruits to join an armed struggle led by al-Qassam.

When the British authorities believed al-Qassam was responsible for the killing of a British police officer, they set out to arrest him. Al-Qassam and twelve of his close supporters (known as "Qassamiyun" or "Qassamites"), including Abu Durra, evaded the authorities for a time before being cornered in the hills near Ya'bad in October 1935. The men refused to surrender and opened fire at the besieging British troops; in the ensuing firefight, al-Qassam and three of his men were killed and five arrested, but Abu Durra managed to escape the area.

== Regional commander in the 1936 revolt ==
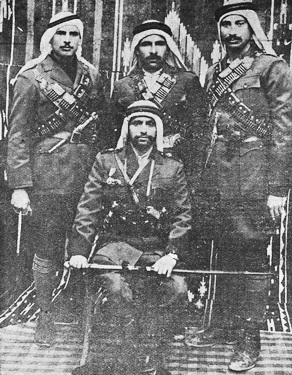
Abu Durra (seated) and members of his rebel unit, sometime between 1936 and 1938

The 1935 confrontation served as a prelude to a countrywide revolt against the British by Palestinian Arabs that broke out in 1936. Abu Durra emerged as one of the major Qassamite commanders of rebels, particularly after the death of commander Ahmad Attiyah Awad in March 1938. Subsequently, Abu Durra assumed the latter's position as the main commander of the region extending from Haifa to Jenin. He eventually became one of four regional commanders of the revolt, the other three being Abu Ibrahim al-Kabir of the Upper Galilee, Abd al-Rahim al-Hajj Muhammad of the Tulkarm area, and Aref Abd al-Razziq of Arraba. These four commanders were appointed by the Damascus-based Central Committee of National Jihad in Palestine to form the Bureau of the Arab Revolt in Palestine, which was meant to increase coordination among the disparate rebel factions and the exiled Palestinian leaders serving on the Central Committee.

Like other local rebel leaders, Abu Durra organized his forces into a relatively small core of semi-permanent fighters and non-permanent, volunteer-based bands (fasa'il; sing. fasil) headed by local commanders subordinate to the main commander. The fasa'il normally launched nighttime attacks and were often used by Abu Durra for specific operations. His core unit was based in the vicinity of Haifa and he presided over 17 fasa'il, totaling an estimated 250 fighters. His second-in-command were Yusuf Hamdan who commanded a fasil in the Umm al-Fahm area, and Nawaf Abu Shahrour 'Abu Ghazi' who commanded the Aljazzar fasil in Haifa sub-district area.

Abu Durra entered into confrontations with the Druze of Mount Carmel due to a number of factors. His earlier recruitment effort to enlist Druze fighters in Haifa was relatively unsuccessful, and his demand for financial contributions from the Mount Carmel villages to purchase 30 rifles were rebuffed. There was also a general suspicion among the rebels that the Druze sheikhs (chiefs) of Mount Carmel were cooperating with the authorities against their cause. In early October 1938, Abu Durra led two successive assaults against the villages of Isfiya and Daliyat al-Karmil. Three Druze men were killed and some local Druze sheikhs were taken prisoner. The rebels also allegedly desecrated Druze religious texts.

Due in part to an alert sent by the Druze residents of Mount Carmel following an attack by Abu Durra in late November 1938, the British Army launched an ambush on his men, while they were on their way to their Umm al-Fahm headquarters. The ensuing engagement became known as the "Battle of Umm al-Zinat [or Umm al-Daraj]", due to its location outside of the village of Umm al-Zinat, which was situated in the southern foothills of Mount Carmel. The British force numbered over a thousand and was backed by 13 fighter planes, while the rebel force was considerably smaller. Abu Durra was wounded and 43 of his fighters were killed, but he managed to escape.

=== Head of Haifa rebels court ===
In the course of the revolt, Abu Durra headed a rebel court in his areas of operation, which were the vicinity of Haifa, Mount Carmel, Wadi Ara, and the Jezreel Valley. The court dealt with issues that ranged from suspected treachery to petty crimes. Abu Durra gained a reputation for ordering the deaths of suspected collaborators among Palestinian village headmen (makhatir, sing. mukhtar). According to interviews conducted by historian Ted Swedenberg of former Palestinian rebels and civilians who lived during the revolt, offhand estimates of the number of makhatir Abu Durra ordered to be executed ranged from around 20 to 85. However, the latter figure was considered "fantastical" by Swedenberg.

The memoirs of Palestinian historian Izzat Darwaza mention an anecdote in which a British citizen pressed the Haifa Magistrates' Court to speed up the recovery of her stolen jewelry from known suspects, was told by the judge that her request would take time and that she might have better luck with Abu Durra's court. Although the judge made the latter suggestion in jest, the woman did go to one of Abu Durra's courts in Ein al-Sahala with the suspects' names; one week later she was summoned back to the court, where her jewelry was restored to her.

=== Arrest and execution ===
In 1939, as the revolt was close to being suppressed, Abu Durra departed Palestine for Damascus. Sometime later, he set out for Hashemite Transjordan. On 24 July, while he was traveling in the eastern Jordan Valley, apparently with the intention of returning to Palestine, he was arrested by the Arab Legion headed by British general John Glubb Pasha. According to Glubb, he was dressed in civilian attire, but had in his possession a military uniform and a "rebel order of battle". He was subsequently detained in a prison in al-Karak until being extradited to Palestine. Abu Durra's arrest and extradition were unpopular among the people of Transjordan and as his convoy passed through various towns on its way to Palestine, it was surrounded by crowds cheering for him.

Abu Durra was tried and sentenced to death for ordering the assassinations of thirty-eight mukhtars on 4–5 January 1939. The mukhtars had been sentenced to death in absentia by rebel courts run by Abu Durra's subordinates. They were charged with selling land illegally, land speculation and collaborating with the British government and Jewish institutions. During the operation, four mukhtars and a prominent rural leader were killed, six mukhtars were wounded, while the remainder had been warned and sought safety. The assassinations of the local leaders contributed to the growing split between the Palestinian Arab public and the rebel leadership. Abu Durra was executed on 18 February 1940. According to the memoirs of British Mandatory police officer Geoffrey Morton, Abu Durra walked to his death with his head held high. He was considered a martyr by his supporters, and during the 1970s, a Palestine Liberation Organization unit that launched raids into Israel was named after him.

== Bibliography ==
- Artzi, Pinhas (1978). Bar-Ilan Studies in History: Confrontation and Coexistence. Bar-Ilan University Press. ISBN 9789652260499.
- Firro, Kais (1992). A History of the Druzes. Vol. 1. BRILL. ISBN 9004094377.
- Great Britain and the East. Vol. 53. Great Britain and the East, Limited. 1939.
- Jayyusi, Salma Khadra (1992). Anthology of Modern Palestinian Literature. Columbia University Press. ISBN 9780231075084.
- Mustafa, Kabha (2011). "The Courts of the Palestinian Revolt, 1936–39". In Singer, Amy; Neumann, Christopher K.; Somel, Selçuk Akşin (eds.). Untold Histories of the Middle East: Recovering Voices from the 19th and 20th Centuries. Routledge. ISBN 9781136926655.
- Milton-Edwards, Beverley (1999). Islamic Politics in Palestine. I.B. Tauris.
- Morris, Benny (2003). The Road to Jerusalem: Glubb Pasha, Palestine and the Jews. I. B. Tauris. ISBN 9781860649899.
- Patai, Raphael (1970). Israel between East and West: a study in human relations. Greenwood Pub. Corp. ISBN 9780837137193. "Yusuf Hamdan."
- Segev, Tom (1999). One Palestine, Complete. Metropolitan Books. ISBN 0-8050-4848-0.
- Swedenburg, Ted (2003). Memories of Revolt: The 1936–1939 Rebellion and the Palestinian National Past. University of Arkansas Press. ISBN 1610752635.
- Thomas, Martin (2008). Empires of Intelligence: Security Services and Colonial Disorder After 1914. University of California Press. ISBN 978-0520933743.
