= Central Committee of National Jihad in Palestine =

Nominal organizational body of the 1936–39 Arab revolt

The Central Committee of National Jihad in Palestine (Arabic: اللجنة المركزية للجهاد الوطني في فلسطين) was the nominal political and organizational body of the 1936–39 Arab revolt in Palestine. It was founded during the second stage of the revolt in November 1937. The Damascus-based Central Committee was founded by Palestinian Arab leaders exiled from the British Mandate of Palestine by the authorities, chief of whom was Izzat Darwaza. The intended purpose of the committee was to provide funds and guidance to the revolt's leaders on the ground, who were largely of rural origin and acted more or less autonomously from the committee and each other.

Because the leaders of the Central Committee were exiled, centralized authority over the revolt proved difficult to establish. The Damascus-based leadership and the mostly rural rebels fighting inside Palestine espoused different political outlooks and this further strained the Committee's attempts to influence rebel actions. Only three of the main rebel leaders in Palestine maintained a collaborative relationship with the Central Committee, while about a dozen others operated beyond the organization's influence.

== Leadership ==
The Central Committee was led by Izzat Darwaza, an exiled teacher, historian and founding member of al-Istiqlal ("Independence Party"). Later, Jamal al-Husayni, the head of the Palestine Arab Party, former Istiqlal member Akram Zuaiter and guerrilla leader Abd al-Qadir al-Husayni joined Darwaza in the committee. The organization was influenced by the Grand Mufti of Jerusalem and the head of Arab Higher Committee (dissolved by the British authorities in late 1937), Mohammad Amin al-Husayni.

The veteran pan-Arab guerrilla leader Fawzi al-Qawuqji and his deputy Muhammad al-Ashmar were invited to lead the rebellion by the Committee and the Grand Mufti, but did not accept the role. Al-Qawuqji had previously served as the revolt's leader on the ground, at least nominally, in 1936. In general, the local rebel leaders fighting in Palestine were wary of outside leaders as well as each other. According to Darwaza, "Each commander defined his area of his operations, which he saw as his own sphere of influence. He would become upset if a neighboring leadership encroached into his area in a way that he saw as a violation of jurisdiction."

In late 1938 the rebels formed a central military command structure called the Bureau of the Arab Revolt in Palestine, which would serve as the Central Committee's military arm. However, the growing rivalry between Abd al-Rahim al-Hajj Muhammad and Arif Abd al-Raziq impeded the Bureau's operations and coordination. The two were designated the rotational role of General Commander of the Revolt. The two other commanders serving on the Bureau were Yusuf Abu Durra of the Haifa-Wadi Ara region and Abu Ibrahim al-Kabir of the Upper Galilee.

In February 1939 al-Hajj Muhammad was confirmed as the sole General Commander by the Central Committee. He was killed fighting British troops and allied Arab "peace bands" near Jenin in late March. Following his death, the Central Committee appointed Ahmad al-Hasan as General Commander, although this did little to boost rebel morale and the revolt dissipated by the winter of 1939.

== Bibliography ==
- Chenoweth, Erica (2010). Rethinking Violence: States and Non-state Actors in Conflict. MIT Press. ISBN 978-0262014205.
- Great Britain and the East. Vol. 53. Great Britain and the East, Limited. 1939.
- Frisch, Hillel (2008). The Palestinian Military: Between Militias and Armies. Routledge. ISBN 978-0203929070.
- Haim, Sylvia G. (1982). Zionism and Arabism in Palestine and Israel. Routledge. ISBN 0203988019.
- Nimr, Sonia (2012). "A Nation in a Hero: Abdul Rahim al-Hajj Mohammad and the Arab Revolt". In Mark Andrew LeVine (ed.). Struggle and Survival in Palestine/Israel. University of California Press. ISBN 978-0520262539.
- Pearlman, Wendy (2011). Violence, Nonviolence, and the Palestinian National Movement. Cambridge University Press. ISBN 978-1139503051.
- Swedenburg, Ted (2003). Memories of Revolt: The 1936-1939 Rebellion and the Palestinian National Past. University of Arkansas Press. ISBN 1610752635.
