= Battle of Anabta =

1936 battle in Mandatory Palestine

- Part of 1936–1939 Arab revolt in Palestine
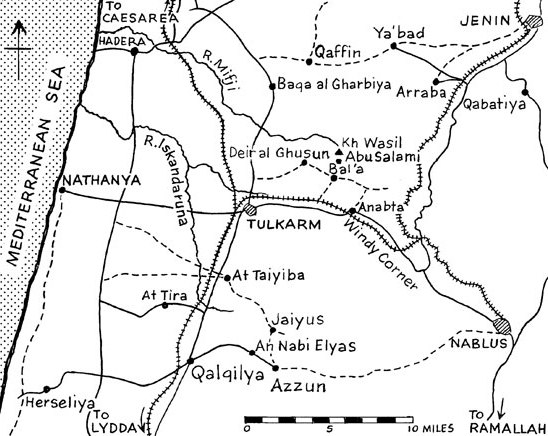
Date	21 June 1936
Location	Anabta, Mandatory Palestine
Result	British victory

Belligerents
United Kingdom	Palestinian Arabs

Commanders and leaders
(United Kingdom) John Evetts (United Kingdom) Henry Sills †	Ibrahim Nassar; Abd al-Rahim al-Hajj

Units involved
British Army	Local rebels (Fasa'il)

Strength
450 British soldiers 4 British aircraft	60–70 Arab fighters

Casualties and losses
2 killed and 3 wounded	10 killed and 4 wounded

The battle of Anabta occurred on June 21, 1936, when Palestinian Arab militants attacked a convoy of civilian buses escorted by British soldiers in Mandatory Palestine, near Anabta. Two British soldiers were killed, along with 10 or 11 Arabs in what the New York Herald Tribune termed a "major fight" in the 1936–39 Arab revolt in Palestine and The Baltimore Sun described as the "heaviest engagement" of the revolt at that point.

== Battle ==
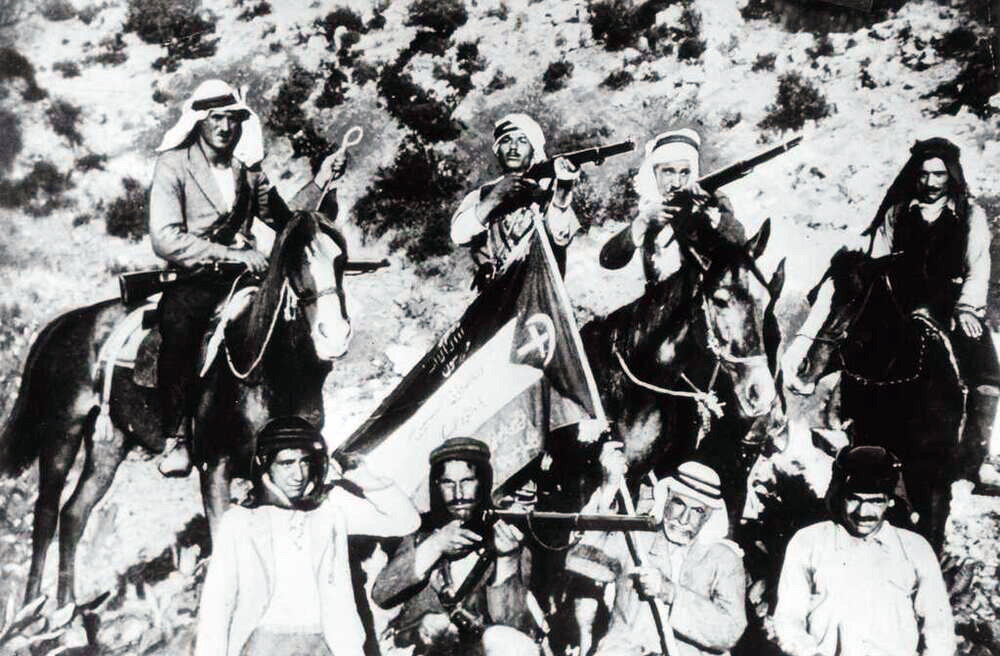
Arab fighters, some mounted on horses, posing with their rifles and a Palestinian national flag

In what The Baltimore Sun described as the "heaviest engagement" of the revolt to date, a convoy of Egged civilian buses was traveling under the protection of British troops when it was ambushed at a point about 1.5 miles (2.4 km) west of Anabta by an estimated 60 to 70 Arab fighters – part of a faction controlled by Ibrahim Nassar – in an encounter that rapidly escalated into a "pitched battle". Sergeant Henry Sills of the Seaforth Highlanders was killed early in the battle; his body was later dragged off the road and into a cave by Arab irregulars. Fighting began at 11am and continued until night fell. Reinforcements arrived from Tulkarm.

Arab fighters had blocked the road with a "barricade of stones," firing on the convoy from cover when it halted to remove the barricade. The second soldier killed was a private in the Royal Scots Fusiliers. Three British battalions from Brigadier John Fullerton Evetts' 16th Infantry Brigade, and four airplanes took part in the battle against an unknown number of Arab militants; three British planes were hit by Arab gunfire but managed to land safely at the airport in Tulkarm. Arab fighters were able to hold the British troops "at bay" until the arrival of British airplanes, machine gun fire from the planes separated the Arabs into two sections that British troops were then able to "encircle and rout." British aircraft then arrived to transport the wounded to hospital. An article in The Guardian described the ambush as, "the most serious fighting since disturbances began," two months earlier.

== Responses ==
The Arab Higher Committee, after the battle, urged their followers to continue the general strike which has been going on for several months. Rely only on "Almighty God and yourselves." the committee instructed its supporters in fresh defiance of the military authorities.

A series of British military actions were launched the day after ambush. In one of these operations, British troops were sent into the cave in which Sills had been dragged; there the British captured two militants and "blew up" the cave using dynamite.

== Context and impact ==
According to Sonia Nimr, who variously describes this event as an "ambush" and a "battle," this was "perhaps the most important engagement," of the Arab general strike that took place in Mandatory Palestine from April through October 1936, with fighting on a "large enough" scale that the British needed to call in reinforcements, and an entire day's fighting required to regain control from the insurgents.

According to Nimr, Mandate authorities issued an arrest warrant for Abd al-Rahim al-Hajj Muhammad as a result of this battle.

The insurgent strategy used in this battle, "ambush a motorized convoy," then disperse into the civilian population, made it difficult for the British to identify and defeat the militants. In September 1936, the British too reorganized their strategy under Orde Wingate.
