= Silat al-Harithiya =

- Municipality type C

Arabic transcription(s)
  - Arabic: سيلة الحارثية
  - Latin: Seilet el-Harthiya (unofficial)
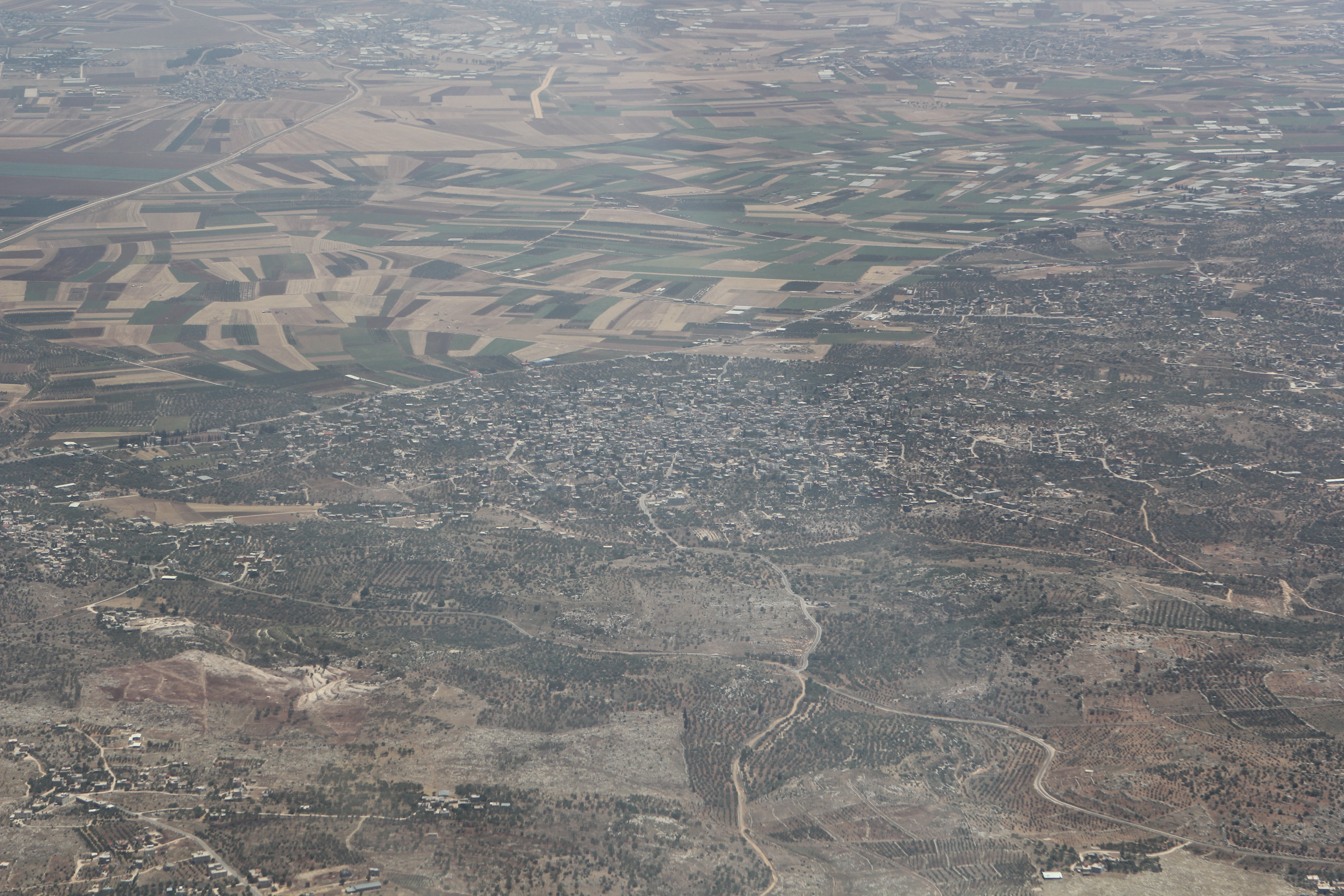
- View of Silat al-Harithiya from the air

- Location of Silat al-Harithiya within Palestine
- Coordinates: 32°30′29″N 35°13′39″E
- Palestine grid: 171/212
- State: State of Palestine
- Governorate: Jenin

Government
  - Type: Municipality
  - Head of Municipality: Adnan Tahayana

Population (2017)
  - Total: 11,449
- Name meaning: Sily, from personal name

Silat al-Harithiya (Arabic: سيلة الحارثية) is a Palestinian village in the Jenin Governorate of Palestine, located 10 kilometres (6.2 mi) northwest of Jenin in the northern West Bank. According to the Palestinian Central Bureau of Statistics census, the town had a population of 9,422 in 2007 and 11,449 in 2017.

== History ==
Pottery remains from the Roman, Byzantine, early Muslim and the Middle Ages have been found here.

=== Ottoman era ===
In 1799, in the Ottoman era, men from Silat al-Harithiya fought Napoleon's invading forces in the Jezreel Valley plain. In 1838 Edward Robinson noted it among many other villages on the plain; Lajjun, Umm al-Fahm, Ti'inik, Kafr Dan, Al-Yamun and el Barid.

In 1870 Victor Guérin noted that Sileh was a large village of 1,000 inhabitants; it was surrounded by gardens planted with fig trees, pomegranates and some vines. In the valley that separated the two areas of which it was composed, there was a oualy dedicated to Sheikh Hasan, with three palm trees in front.

In 1870/1871 (1288 AH), an Ottoman census listed 449 households in the village within the nahiya of Shafa al-Gharby.

In 1882, the PEF's Survey of Western Palestine described it as "a good-sized village, well built of stone, with a spring and cisterns. There are rock-cut wine-presses on the west, and olives and figs round".

During this time, the residents of Silat al-Harthiya contested Umm al-Fahm's possession of the lands of Lajjun.

=== British Mandate period ===
Palestine, including Silat al-Harithiya, was captured by British forces during World War I and the country subsequently came under a British Mandate. In the 1922 census of Palestine, Selet al-Hartiyeh had a population of 1,041, all Muslims, increasing in the 1931 census to 1,259 inhabitants, still all Muslims, living in 295 houses.

In the 1945 statistics the population of Silat al-Harithiya was 1,860, all Muslims, with 8,931 dunams of land, according to an official land and population survey. 2,534 dunams were used for plantations and irrigable land, 1,140 dunams for cereals, while 80 dunams were built-up (urban) land and 3,179 dunams were classified as "non-cultivable".

=== Jordanian era ===
In the wake of the 1948 Arab–Israeli War, and after the 1949 Armistice Agreements, the whole Jenin-area came under Jordanian rule, together with the rest of the West Bank.

In 1961, the population of Silet Harithiya was 2,566.

=== Post 1967 ===
Since the Six-Day War in 1967, Silat al-Harithiya has been under Israeli occupation. The Israeli occupation led Abdullah Yusuf Azzam to leave his home in the village, and "never again set foot in Palestine." He was later cofounder of al-Qaeda.

== Notable residents ==
- Yusuf Abu Durra, Palestinian Arab rebel leader during 1936 revolt against British
- Abdullah Yusuf Azzam, Sunni Islamic scholar and theologian and founding member of al-Qaeda
- Hikmat Zaid, Former minister, governor of Jenin, advisor, and ambassador

== Bibliography ==
- Barron, J.B., ed. (1923). Palestine: Report and General Abstracts of the Census of 1922. Government of Palestine.
- Bornstein, Avram S. (2002). Crossing the Green Line Between the West Bank and Israel. University of Pennsylvania Press. ISBN 0812217934.
- Conder, C.R.; Kitchener, H.H. (1882). The Survey of Western Palestine: Memoirs of the Topography, Orography, Hydrography, and Archaeology. Vol. 2. London: Committee of the Palestine Exploration Fund.
- Government of Jordan, Department of Statistics (1964). First Census of Population and Housing. Volume I: Final Tables; General Characteristics of the Population (PDF).
- Government of Palestine, Department of Statistics (1945). Village Statistics, April, 1945.
- Guérin, V. (1875). Description Géographique Historique et Archéologique de la Palestine (in French). Vol. 2: Samarie, pt. 2. Paris: L'Imprimerie Nationale.
- Hadawi, S. (1970). Village Statistics of 1945: A Classification of Land and Area ownership in Palestine. Palestine Liberation Organization Research Center.
- Hegghammer, T. (2013). "Abdallāh ʿAzzām and Palestine" (PDF). Die Welt des Islams. 53-3-4: 353–387. doi:10.1163/15685152-5334P0003. Archived from the original (PDF) on 2016-11-10.
- Mills, E., ed. (1932). Census of Palestine 1931. Population of Villages, Towns and Administrative Areas. Jerusalem: Government of Palestine.
- Palmer, E.H. (1881). The Survey of Western Palestine: Arabic and English Name Lists Collected During the Survey by Lieutenants Conder and Kitchener, R. E. Transliterated and Explained by E.H. Palmer. Committee of the Palestine Exploration Fund.
- Robinson, E.; Smith, E. (1841). Biblical Researches in Palestine, Mount Sinai and Arabia Petraea: A Journal of Travels in the year 1838. Vol. 3. Boston: Crocker & Brewster.
- Swedenburg, Ted (2003). Memories of Revolt: The 1936–1939 Rebellion and the Palestinian National Past. University of Arkansas Press. ISBN 1610752635.
- Zertal, A. (2016). The Manasseh Hill Country Survey. Vol. 3. Boston: BRILL. ISBN 978-9004312302.
