= Al Tayeb Abdul Rahim =

Palestinian politician (1944–2020)

- الطيب عبد الرحيم
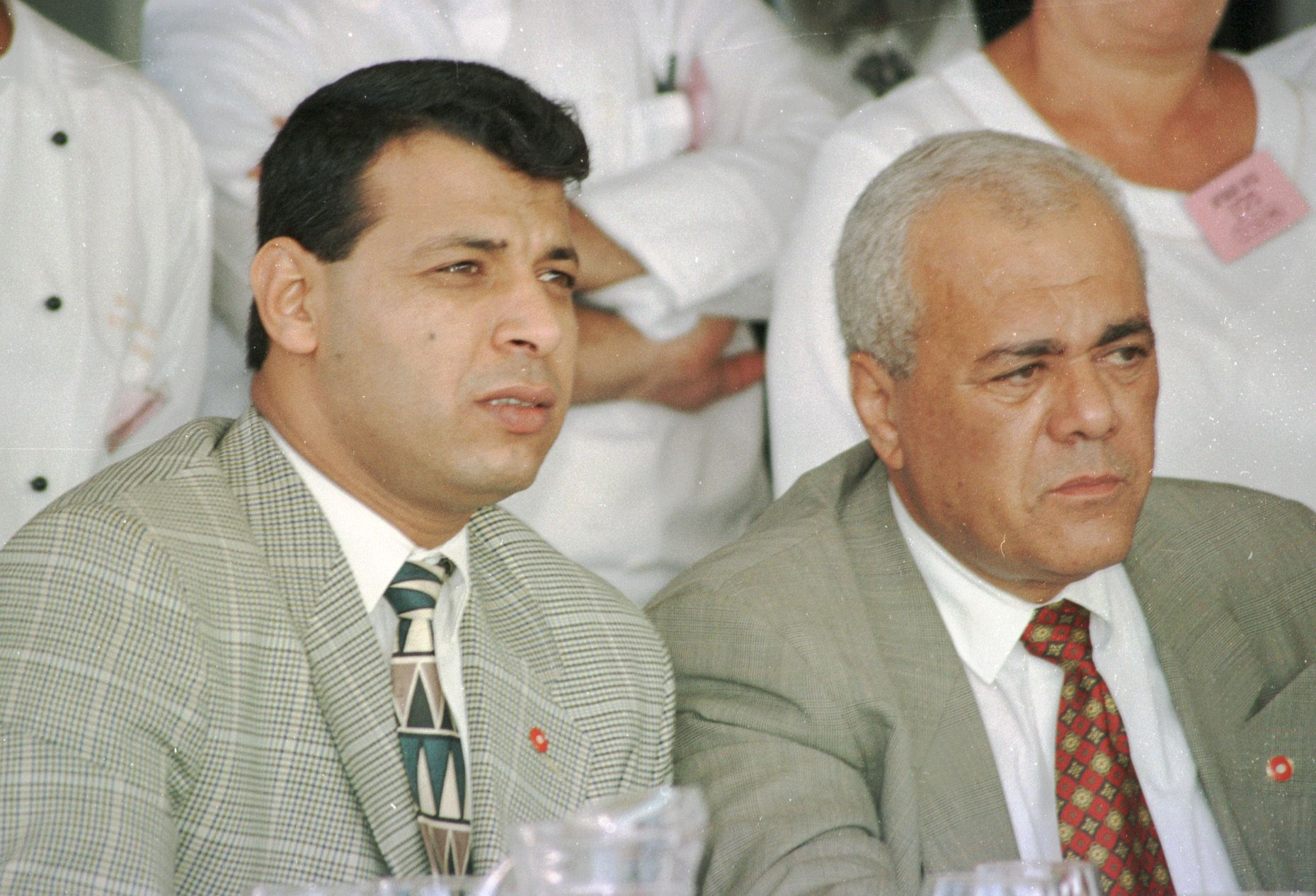
- Al Tayeb Abdul Rahim (right) in 1996

Secretary-General of the Palestinian Presidency
- In office 1993 – 18 March 2020
- President: Yasser Arafat; Mahmoud Abbas

Member of the Central Committee of the Fatah Movement
- In office 1988 – 18 March 2020
- President: Yasser Arafat; Mahmoud Abbas

Ambassador of the Palestine Liberation Organization to China, Egypt, Yugoslavia, and Jordan
- President: Yasser Arafat; Mahmoud Abbas

Member of the Palestinian Legislative Council
- In office 7 March 1996 – 18 February 2006
- Constituency: Tulkarm Governorate

Personal details
- Born: 1944 Anabta, Palestine
- Died: 18 March 2020 (aged 75–76) Cairo, Egypt
- Party: Fatah
- Education: Bachelor's degree in Commerce
- Alma mater: Al-Azhar University
- Occupation: Politician

Al Tayeb Abdul Rahim (Arabic: الطيّب عبد الرحيم; 1944 – 18 March 2020) was a Palestinian politician, former Secretary-General of the Palestinian Presidency and a former member of the Central Committee of the Fatah movement. Also he was one of the founders of the Palestinian National Authority (PNA).

== Early life and education ==
In 1944, Tayeb Abdel Rahim Mahmoud Abdel Halim was born in Anabta town, east of Tulkarm city, to a Palestinian family. His father was the Palestinian poet Abdel Rahim Mahmoud and his maternal grandfather was Ibrahim Nassar. He enrolled at Al-Azhar University in 1962, and obtained a Bachelor's degree in Commerce.

== Positions ==
Abdel-Raheem has been a member of the Palestinian National Council since 1977, a member of the Revolutionary Council of Fatah since 1980 and also a member of the Central Committee of the Fatah movement since 1988. He was ambassador of the Palestine Liberation Organization to China, Egypt, Yugoslavia, and Jordan. He participated in the Oslo Accords and is considered one of the founders of the Palestinian National Authority. He returned with the Palestinian President Yasser Arafat to Palestine, was entrusted with the functions of Secretary-General of the Palestinian Presidency in 1993 and held the position until his death. He became a member of the Palestinian Legislative Council in 1996, after being elected as a candidate for Tulkarm Governorate.

== Death ==
On 18 March 2020, Al Tayeb Abdel Rahim died in Cairo.
