= Hakam Balawi =

Palestinian diplomat and politician (1938–2020)

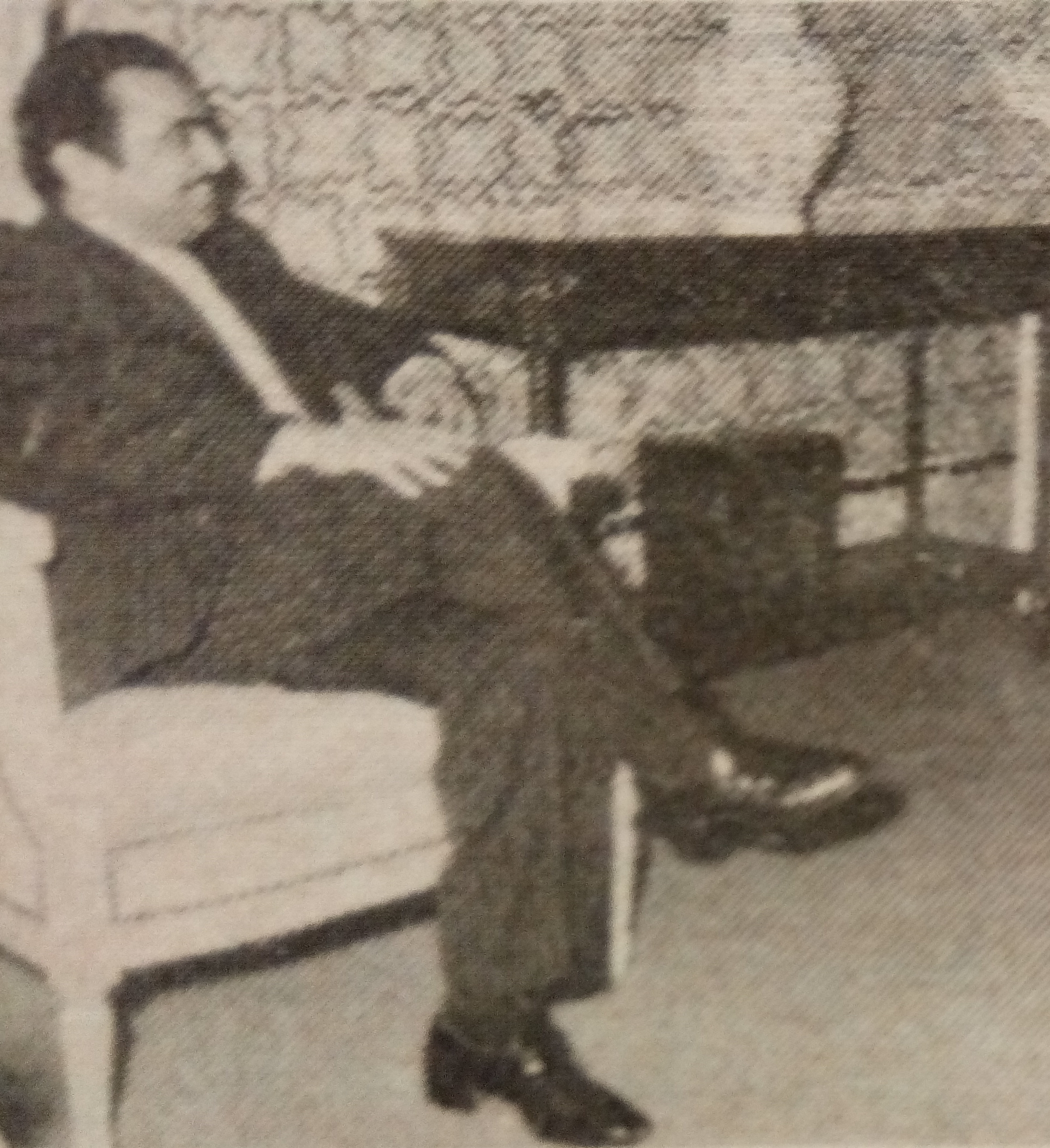

Minister of Interior
- In office 13 October 2003 – 24 February 2005; Acting: 13 October 2003 – 12 November 2003
- Prime Minister: Ahmed Qurei
- Preceded by: Mahmoud Abbas
- Succeeded by: Nasser Yousef

Member of the Palestinian Legislative Council
- In office 7 March 1996 – 28 November 2020

Palestinian Ambassador to Tunisia
- In office 1983–1994

Palestinian Deputy Ambassador to Libya
- In office 1973–1975

Personal details
- Born: Hakam Umar As‘ad Balawi; 1938 Bal'a, Palestine
- Died: 28 November 2020 (aged 82) Bal'a, Palestine
- Party: Fatah
- Children: 4
- Occupation: Politician, diplomat

Hakam Umar As‘ad Balawi (Arabic: حكم بلعاوي; 1938 – 28 November 2020) was a Palestinian politician and a member of the Palestinian National Authority cabinet and the Palestinian Legislative Council.

== Early life and education ==
Balawi was born in the town of Bal'a, near Tulkarm in British Mandatory Palestine in 1938. He had diplomas in administration, journalism and education.

== Career ==
Balawi was the deputy head of the central information committee of Fatah from 1968 to 1978. His political career began when he was assigned as the Palestine Liberation Organization's ambassador to Libya from 1973 to 1975, after which he became a staunch Fatah activist and then was the PLO's ambassador to Tunisia from 1983 to 1994.

Yasser Arafat assigned Balawi the cabinet post of Minister of Interior in November 2003. His tenure lasted until 24 February 2005 when a new cabinet formed. Balawi was also a member of executive committee of Fatah, a member of the Palestinian National Council and the Secretary of the Union of Palestinian Writers and Journalists. During Arafat's presidency of the PNA and his chairmanship of the PLO, Balawi was said to be a "loyalist".

== Personal life ==
Balawi wrote several plays and novels. He was married and had four children.

Balawi died on 28 November 2020, at the age of 82.

== See also ==
- Salah Zawawi

Diplomatic posts
Preceded by –	Palestinian Deputy Ambassador to Libya; 1973–1975	Succeeded by –
Preceded by –	Palestinian Ambassador to Tunisia; 1983–1994	Succeeded by –
Political offices
Preceded by Mahmoud Abbas	Minister of Interior; 2003–2005	Succeeded by Nasser Yousef
