= Hillel Frisch =

Israeli political scientist

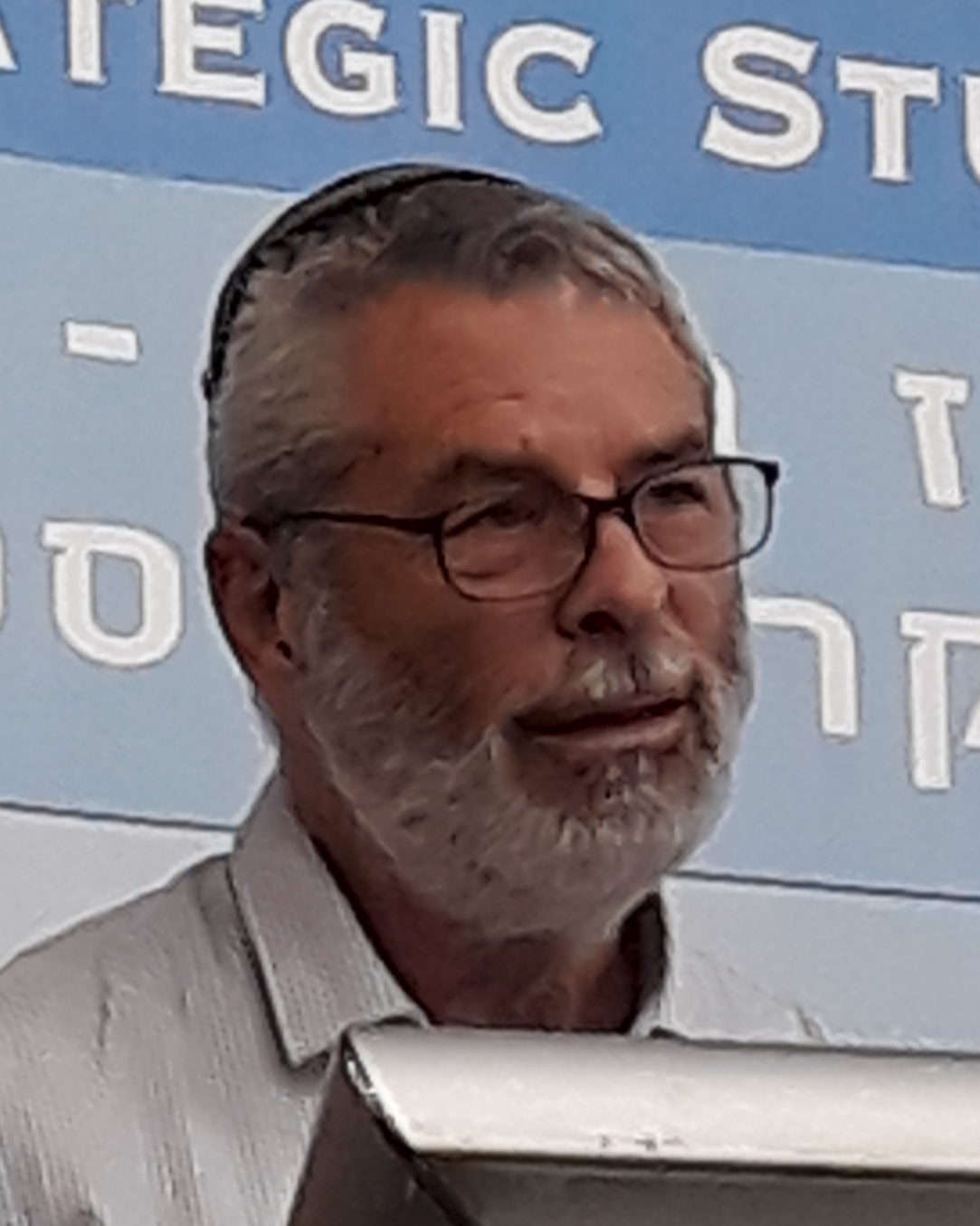
Frisch, 2021

Hillel Frisch (Hebrew: הלל פריש; born 1953) is an Israeli political scientist and professor of Political Science and Middle Eastern History at Bar-Ilan University. His work focuses on Israeli-Palestinian interactions and military strategies, the political impact of Islam, institutions and the military, the political dynamics of the Israeli Arab community, the Muslim Brotherhood in Jordan, the Palestinian territories, Egypt, the Jordanian-Palestinian relationship, and Islamism.

Frish earned a BA from Tel Aviv University (1974), an MA in International Relations from Columbia University (1977) and a PhD in Political Science from the Hebrew University of Jerusalem in 1990. He is also a senior researcher at the Begin–Sadat Center for Strategic Studies.

== Books ==
- Israel's Security and Its Arab Citizens (Cambridge University Press, 2011)
- The Palestinian Military: Between Militias and Armies (Routledge, 2008)
- Islamic Radicalism and International Security: Challenges and Response, co-edited with Efraim Inbar, (Routledge, 2007)
- Countdown to Statehood: Palestinian State Formation in the West Bank and Gaza (SUNY Press, 1998)
