= Hebron massacre =

Hebron massacre may refer to:

- 1517 Hebron attacks
- Battle of Hebron in 1834
- 1929 Hebron massacre, in the 1929 Arab riots in Mandatory Palestine
- 1980 Hebron attack
- Cave of the Patriarchs massacre, a 1994 mass shooting also known as the Hebron massacre
- Hebron Massacre, a 1994 album by Muslimgauze
