= Abu Ibrahim al-Kabir =

Mid-20th century Palestinian Arab commander

Khalil Muhammad Issa
- Born: 1899; Mutasarrifate of Jerusalem, Ottoman Empire
- Died: 1979 (aged 80)
- Other name: Abu Ibrahim al-Kabir
- Occupations: Laborer, guerrilla
- Known for: Regional Commander in the 1936–39 Palestine revolt

Khalil Muhammad Issa, better known by his nom de guerre Abu Ibrahim al-Kabir, was a Palestinian Arab commander during the 1936-39 Arab revolt in Palestine.

== Life ==
Abu Ibrahim worked as a labourer in Haifa during the 1920s. It was during this time that he became a close disciple of Izz ad-Din al-Qassam, who was organising peasants and urban dwellers in northern Palestine into an armed movement. By the early 1930s, Abu Ibrahim was advocating for the movement to launch a revolt against the British colonial authorities in Palestine immediately following the 1929 riots, arguing that delay would allow the British to further restrict and weaken the Palestinian community.

After al-Qassam's death in 1935, Abu Ibrahim, along with other deputies such as Farhan al-Sa'di and Attiyah Abu Awad, took command of rebel bands. Together, they spearheaded the 1936 revolt. Abu Ibrahim was among the leading commanders of Palestinian rebels in the Upper Galilee. His unit, which drew Qassamiyun from the villages between Haifa and Saffuriya, called themselves "al-Darawish", which translates as "the Dervishes".

In October 1937, a headquarters for the revolt was set up in Damascus, Syria, known as the Central Committee of National Jihad in Palestine. Abu Ibrahim became the sole rebel commander serving on the committee. He was skilled at raising funds and procuring weapons for the armed struggle. Although based in Damascus, he regularly entered Palestine to assess his group's situation and distribute stipends. In 1938, he personally led an assault on Jewish neighbourhoods in Tiberias, resulting in the deaths of 19 Jewish residents. According to contemporary accounts of some Palestinians, Abu Ibrahim also oversaw the campaign to eliminate Palestinian individuals who cooperated with the British authorities in the Galilee.

Unlike many of his comrades, Abu Ibrahim survived the revolt. He died in 1979, at the age of 80.

== Bibliography ==
- Barr, James (2012). A Line in the Sand: The Anglo-French Struggle for the Middle East, 1914–1948. W. W. Norton & Company. ISBN 9780393070651.
- Swedenburg, Ted (2003). Memories of Revolt: The 1936–1939 Rebellion and the Palestinian National Past. University of Arkansas Press. ISBN 1610752635.
