= Bal'a =

- Municipality type C

Arabic transcription(s)
  - Arabic: بلعا
  - Latin: Bala'a (official); Balaa (unofficial)
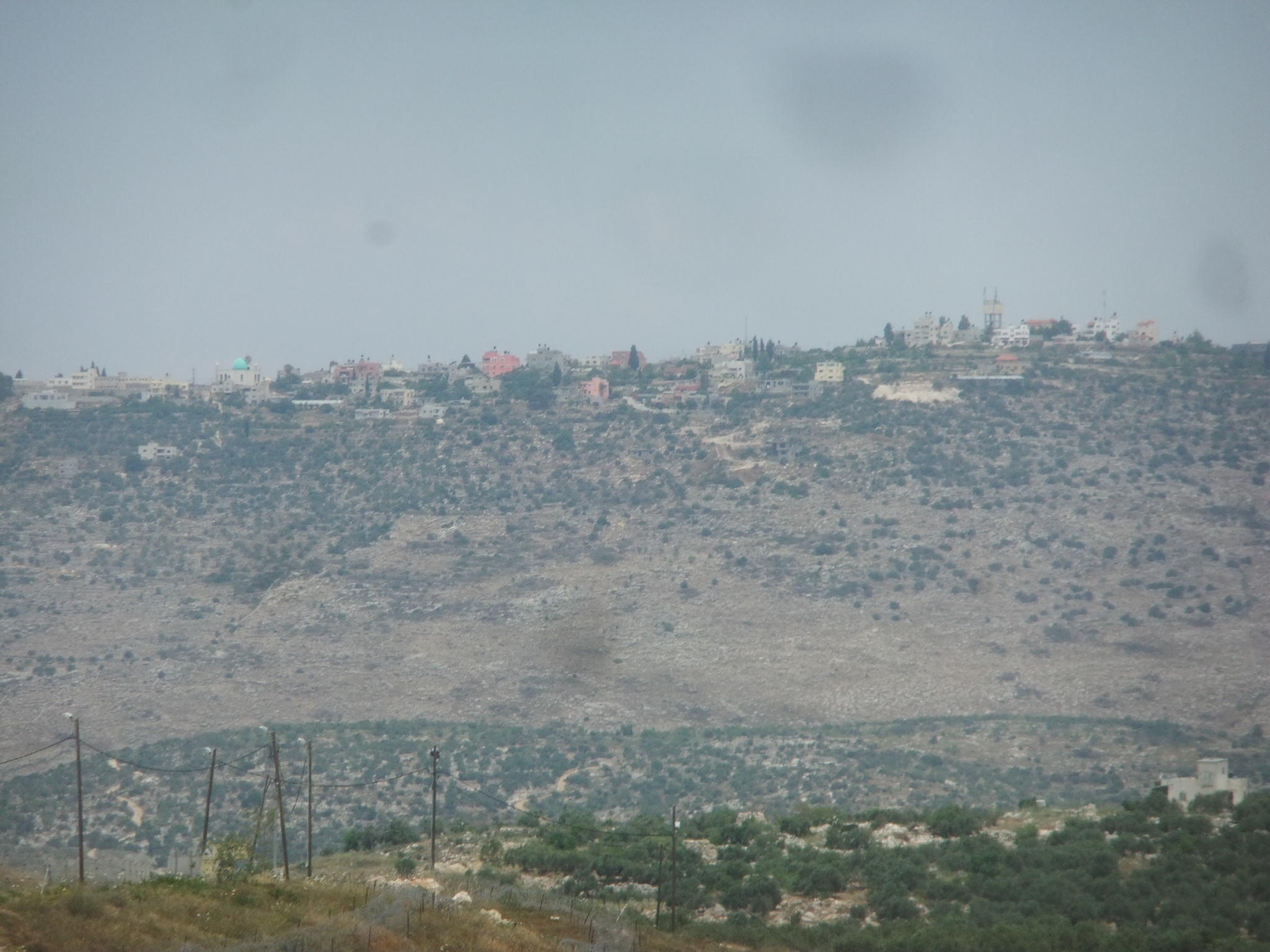
- Southern Bal'a

- Location of Bal'a within Palestine
- Coordinates: 32°19′59″N 35°06′31″E
- Palestine grid: 160/193
- State: State of Palestine
- Governorate: Tulkarm

Government
  - Type: Municipality (from 1995)
  - Head of Municipality: Ahmad Said Mansur

Area
  - Total: 23.0 km^{2} (8.9 sq mi)

Population (2017)
  - Total: 7,822
  - Density: 340/km^{2} (881/sq mi)
- Name meaning: Either "Swallowing", or "The hole in the millstone",

Bal'a (Arabic: بلعا) is a Palestinian town in the Tulkarm Governorate, located approximately nine kilometers northeast of Tulkarm in the northern West Bank and three kilometers away from the highway connecting Tulkarm with Nablus.

According to the Palestinian Central Bureau of Statistics (PCBS), the town had a population of approximately 6,604 in 2007 and 7,822 in 2017. In 1922, the town had a population of 1,259 nearly doubled to 2,220 in 1945. After Israel's occupation of the town in 1967 after the Six-Day War, Bal'a inhabitants numbered 3,800 after dozens of families from nearby towns such as, Deir al-Ghusun settled there after being expelled.

== History ==
A tomb was broken into near this village about the time of the Palestine Exploration Fund visit. It consisted of a single chamber with a loculus on each of three walls. The door was an inscribed slab, with rough ornamentation. Tyrwhitt Drake found a date, corresponding to 332 CE.

The place name ends with a long vowel -ā, typically reflecting the Aramaic absolute state, a morphological feature widely attested in Palestinian toponyms.

=== Ottoman era ===
Bal'a, like all of Palestine, was incorporated into the Ottoman Empire in 1517. In the 1596 tax registers, it was part of the nahiya ("subdistrict") of Jabal Sami, part of the larger Sanjak of Nablus. It had a population of 6 households, all Muslims. The inhabitants paid a fixed tax rate of 33,3% on agricultural products, including wheat, barley, summer crops, olive trees, goats and beehives, in addition to occasional revenues; a total of 1,658 akçe. Ceramics from the Ottoman era have been found here. Based on the potsherds found there, 80% of which date to the Ottoman period and 20% to the 20th century, Zertal assumed that the village was established in the 16th–17th centuries. In Grossman opinion the residents of Bal'a hailed from the villages Barbara, Deir al-Ghusun, and Jatt.

In 1838 it was noted as a village in the western Sha'rawiya administrative region, north of Nablus.

In 1870/1871 (1288 AH), an Ottoman census listed the village in the nahiya (sub-district) of Wadi al-Sha'ir. In 1882, the PEF's Survey of Western Palestine (SWP) described Bal'a as a "good-sized village on very high ground, with magnificent groves of olives to the west, and supplied by cisterns. It is apparently an ancient site, having rock-cut tombs."

=== British Mandate era ===
In the 1922 census of Palestine conducted by the British Mandate authorities, Bal'a's population was 1,259, all Muslims, increasing in the 1931 census to 1,539 residents, still all Muslim, in a total of 344 houses. In the 1945 statistics the population of Bal'a was 2,220 Muslims. and the land area was 21,151 dunams, according to an official land and population survey. 70 dunams were for citrus and bananas, 7,766 dunams were plantations and irrigable land, 2,753 used for cereals, while 42 dunams were built-up (urban) land.

=== Jordanian era ===
In the wake of the 1948 Arab–Israeli War, and after the 1949 Armistice Agreements, Bal'a came under Jordanian rule. In 1961, the population of Bal'a was 2,888.

=== Post-1967 ===
After the Six-Day War in 1967, Bal'a has been under Israeli occupation.

== Demographics ==
The town's growth stunted after the Six-Day War, going from 3,400 in 1967 to just 3,800 in 1987.

In the first Palestinian census by the Palestinian Central Bureau of Statistics (PCBS) in 1997, Bal'a had a population of 5,444 inhabitants. More than 20% of the residents were Palestinian refugees. The gender make-up was 49.1% male and 50.9% female. In 2007, Bal'a's residents numbered 6,604. In 2017, the population was 7,822.

The population of Bal'a comes from different places. Some are from Barbara, near Ashkelon, while others are from Deir al-Ghussun and Jit.

== Economy ==
Bal'a's primary source of income is agriculture. The town's land area consists of about 23,000 dunams most of which is arable land. The town annually produces an average 10,000 tons of olive oil with olives being the main cash crop of Bal'a and surrounding towns and villages. Other common orchards include figs, apricots and almonds. Wheat and barley are grown during the winter while tomatoes, marrows and green peppers are grown mostly during the summer. Livestock is a major factor in Bal'a's agriculture sector as many families own thousands of hens as well as sheep, goats and cattle.

A few hundred in the town work for the Palestinian National Authority (PNA) in careers as teachers, doctors and business managers. A large number of people are in service with various PNA security branches, including the Preventive Security Service. The town's built-up area is currently about 3,600 dunams. Bal'a has six schools: Two secondary, four primary. Boys and girls attend different schools. There are also three kindergartens.

== Notable people from Bal'a ==
- Hakam Balawi - Top aide of Yasser Arafat, former PLO ambassador to Algeria and Tunisia and the Interior Minister of the Palestinian National Authority in 2003.

== Bibliography ==
- Barron, J.B., ed. (1923). Palestine: Report and General Abstracts of the Census of 1922. Government of Palestine.
- Conder, C.R.; Kitchener, H.H. (1882). The Survey of Western Palestine: Memoirs of the Topography, Orography, Hydrography, and Archaeology. Vol. 2. London: Committee of the Palestine Exploration Fund.
- Government of Jordan, Department of Statistics (1964). First Census of Population and Housing. Volume I: Final Tables; General Characteristics of the Population (PDF).
- Government of Palestine, Department of Statistics (1945). Village Statistics, April, 1945.
- Hadawi, S. (1970). Village Statistics of 1945: A Classification of Land and Area ownership in Palestine. Palestine Liberation Organization Research Center.
- Hütteroth, W.-D.; Abdulfattah, K. (1977). Historical Geography of Palestine, Transjordan and Southern Syria in the Late 16th Century. Erlanger Geographische Arbeiten, Sonderband 5. Erlangen, Germany: Vorstand der Fränkischen Geographischen Gesellschaft. ISBN 3-920405-41-2.
- Mills, E., ed. (1932). Census of Palestine 1931. Population of Villages, Towns and Administrative Areas. Jerusalem: Government of Palestine.
- Palmer, E.H. (1881). The Survey of Western Palestine: Arabic and English Name Lists Collected During the Survey by Lieutenants Conder and Kitchener, R. E. Transliterated and Explained by E.H. Palmer. Committee of the Palestine Exploration Fund.
- Robinson, E.; Smith, E. (1841). Biblical Researches in Palestine, Mount Sinai and Arabia Petraea: A Journal of Travels in the year 1838. Vol. 3. Boston: Crocker & Brewster.
- Zertal, A. (2016). The Manasseh Hill Country Survey. Vol. 3. Boston: BRILL. ISBN 978-9004312302.
