= List of killings and massacres in Mandatory Palestine =

This is a list of killings and massacres committed in Mandatory Palestine. It is restricted to incidents in which at least three people were deliberately killed. This list does not include unlawful deaths due to criminal activity. It includes all casualties that resulted from the initial attack on civilians or non-combat military personnel.

Individual massacres during the 1936–1939 Arab revolt in Palestine are listed below. In total, during the course of these events, between September 27, 1937 – 1939, 5,000 Arabs, 415 Jews and several hundred Britons were killed.

== List of killings and massacres committed in Mandatory Palestine ==
Name	Date	Fatalities	notes
Battle of Tel Hai	March 1, 1920	13	8 Jews, 5 Arabs killed Armed Arabs were looking for French soldiers, and Jews mounted armed resistance.
1920 Nebi Musa riots	April 4–7, 1920	9	5 Jews, 4 Arabs killed; 216 Jews, 18 Arabs, 7 Britons wounded Started by inflammatory language at an Arab rally. Origin of violence uncertain, but a witness reported stone throwing by Arabs.
Jaffa riots	May 1–7, 1921	95	48 Arabs, 47 Jews killed; 140 Jews, 73 Arabs wounded. Began as a fight between two Jewish groups. Arabs joined in because they thought they were being attacked.
1929 Palestine riots	August 23–29, 1929	249	133 Jews, 116 Arabs killed; 339 Jews, 232 Arabs wounded; includes the Hebron massacre (67 Jews killed; 58 Jews wounded and a massacre in Safed (18–20 Jews killed; 80 Jews wounded) Mostly violence by Arabs against Jews; most Arabs killed by Mandate police. Thought triggered by a recent Jewish demonstration.
Black Hand killings at Kibbutz Yagur	April 11, 1931	3	3 Jews at Kibbutz Yagur
1931-1932 Black Hand attacks	1931-1932	6	6 Jews
1933 Palestine riots	October 27, 1933	16	1 Arab policeman, 15 Arab demonstrators shot by British security forces, 1 Arab child hit by a stray bullet.
1933 Haifa riot	October 27–28, 1933	4	4 Palestinian rioters killed, 1 policeman stabbed, 3 Palestinian rioters wounded, 5 Jewish civilians injured by rioters, 4 of them seriously.
Jaffa riots (April 1936)	April 19–20, 1936	21	9 Jews killed, 40 Jews wounded (11 critically) in Arab attack in Jaffa. Police killed two attackers. Further 7 Jews and 3 Arabs killed the next day
Arab general strike	April 20 – October 12, 1936	314	197 Arabs killed and 823 wounded, 80 Jews killed and 300 wounded, 37 military and police killed and 95 wounded.
NA	August 13, 1937	4	4 members of a Jewish family, 3 children, shot dead by Arabs who broke into their home in Safed
NA	November 9, 1937	5	5 Jewish Keren Kayemet workers killed near Har Haruach by an Arab ambush. Ma'ale HaHamisha was named in their honor.
N/A	March 28, 1938	6	6 Jewish passengers killed by Arabs while traveling from Haifa to Safed.
N/A	August 16, 1938	3	A Jewish family was kidnapped by Arabs in Atlit. 3 killed.
1938 Tiberias massacre	October 2, 1938	19	19 Jews were killed, 11 of whom children.
N/A	February 27, 1939	33	33 Arabs were killed in multiple attacks, incl. 24 by bomb in Arab market in Suk Quarter of Haifa and 4 by bomb in Arab vegetable market in Jerusalem.
N/A	June 2, 1939	5	5 Arabs were killed by a bomb at the Jaffa Gate in Jerusalem.
N/A	June 19, 1939	20	20 Arabs were killed by explosives mounted on a donkey at a marketplace in Haifa.
Italian bombing of Tel Aviv	September 9, 1940	137	130 Jews and 7 Arabs killed in a bombing run.
N/A	November 1, 1945	4	5 locomotives destroyed in Lydda station. Two staff, one soldier and one policeman killed. One of the bombers, Yehiel Dresner, was later executed for other crimes.
N/A	July 1, 1946	4	Four Jews were killed and 80 were injured during searches of arms depots. 27 villages were searched, a large arms depot was found underground in Meshek Yagur
King David Hotel bombing	July 22, 1946	91	91 killed, including 41 Arabs, 28 Britons, and 17 Jews; 40-45 wounded
N/A	August 3, 1946	5	Two Jews, three Arab attackers killed and nine Jews were wounded in a shooting fray, when a group of armed Arabs tried to prevent Jews from erecting a new settlement near Kfar Blum
N/A	August 13, 1946	3	Three Jews were killed and seven wounded
N/A	November 3, 1946	4	Two Jews and two Arabs are killed in clashes between Arabs and a group of Jews
N/A	November 3, 1946	5	2 Jews murdered, 3 Arab attackers killed during an attack during construction of Neot Mordechai.
N/A	November 9, 1946	3	8 Jews, 3 British officers killed, 2 injured by landmine in David street in Jerusalem
N/A	December 2–5, 1946	10	Ten persons, including six British soldiers, were killed in bomb and landmine explosions
N/A	July 31, 1947	5	Two Jewish men, two Jewish women and a Jewish boy killed by British gunfire
N/A	July 31, 1947	5	Four men, one undocumented woman killed by fire from men in both military and civilian clothes. The men smashed windows and broke property as they marched through Ben Yehuda street
N/A	July 31, 1947	5	5 jews killed, several others injured
N/A	August 11, 1947	5	Five Jews killed by a band of Arabs in a cafe
Fajja bus attacks	November 30, 1947	7	7 Jews killed in two incidents by gunfire
1947 Jerusalem riots	December 2, 1947	14	8 Jews Reported Killed
N/A	December 6, 1947	3	3 Jews sniped (killed) by Arabs
N/A	December 7, 1947	5	4 Jews killed, five injured. One Arab killed
N/A	December 7, 1947	6	5 Jews, one Arab killed. One of the Jewish casualties was a girl who was killed by a sniper
N/A	December 8, 1947	19	14 Jews, 3 Arabs, 2 British soldiers killed
N/A	December 8, 1947	4	4 Jews killed or burnt alive, during an Arab attack
N/A	December 8, 1947	6	4 Jews, one Arab and one Briton killed
N/A	December 8, 1947	6	6 Jews killed in Jaffa
N/A	December 9, 1947	6	6 Teenage Jews (one a girl) killed by Arab mob in gevulot
N/A	December 10, 1947	4	3 Jews, one Arab attacker killed
N/A	December 10, 1947	6	6 Jews shot and stabbed to death by an Arab
N/A	December 11, 1947	10	10 Jews killed in an Arab attack on Jewish convoy
al-Tira	December 12, 1947	13	13 Arabs killed, 10 wounded
N/A	December 12, 1947	3	3 Jews killed by Arabs. Of them 2 are employees of British Overseas Airways, and one is a cook. killed in Lydda
N/A	December 12, 1947	3	3 Jews killed by Arabs while inspecting a pipe
N/A	December 12, 1947	20	20 killed, 5 wounded by barrel bomb at Damascus Gate.
N/A	December 12, 1947	3	3 Jews killed, 4 missing in an Arab attack
N/A	December 13, 1947	3	3 Jews killed while defending against an Arab attack
N/A	December 13, 1947	16	16 Arabs killed; 67 Arabs wounded from bombings in Jerusalem and Jaffa; Irgun also burns down 100 Arab homes in Jaffa
N/A	December 14, 1947	14	14 Jews killed, 10 injured from Arab Legion fire while supplying the Ben Shemen Youth Village
N/A	December 16, 1947	10	10 killed by bomb at Noga Cinema in Jaffa.
al-Khisas massacre	December 18, 1947	10	10 Arabs killed
N/A	December 24, 1947	8	4 Jews killed in Haifa by snipers, 4 Arabs killed in reprisals
N/A	December 25, 1947	4	2 Jewish guards and 2 Arabs killed, 6 Jews injured
N/A	December 26, 1947	7	7 Jews killed while driving in convoy to Jerusalem. Amongst them was the leader of the Jewish humanitarian organization Youth Aliyah
N/A	December 28, 1947	10	5 Jews killed in Bab el Wad by snipers, 5 Arabs killed in reprisals
N/A	December 29, 1947	17	4 Jews killed in Tel Aviv from mortar and sniper fire, 13 Arabs killed in Jerusalem in Irgun bombing
Bomb thrown on Damascus Gate Café in Jerusalem	December 29, 1947	13	11 Arabs, 2 Britons killed Uri Milstein reported 15 casualties from the bombing in the Palestine Post.
Haifa Oil Refinery massacre	December 30, 1947	39	39 Jews beaten to death, 49 Jews injured by Arabs after an Irgun bombing which killed 6
N/A	December 31, 1947	3	3 Jews killed during an attack by Arabs
Balad al-Shaykh massacre	January 1, 1948	50	17–70 Arabs killed in Haifa
Bombing of Arab National Committee HQ	January 4, 1948	14	14 Arabs killed; 100 Arabs wounded
Semiramis Hotel bombing	January 5, 1948	20	20 Arabs killed in Jerusalem
N/A	January 5, 1948	14	14 Arabs killed and 19 injured by truck bomb outside the 3-storey 'Serrani', Jaffa's built Ottoman Town Hall
N/A	January 5, 1948	4	4 Arabs killed after attacking Jewish quarter in Safed
Jaffa Gate bombing in Jerusalem	January 7, 1948	18	15–20 Arabs killed
N/A	January 10, 1948	11	11 Jews killed, 1 decapitated near Yavne
N/A	January 14, 1948	7	7 Jews, 2 Britons killed in Haifa by Arab bomb
N/A	January 20, 1948	8	8 Jews killed, 9 seriously injured and 2 lightly injured in Yehiam
N/A	January 22, 1948	7	7 Jews killed near Yazur
N/A	January 25, 1948	10	10 Jews killed
N/A	January 27, 1948	4	4 Arabs killed after opening fire on a British army patrol in Gaza
Bombing of The Palestine Post Headquarters	2–5 February 1948	4 killed, 16 injured	3 Jewish employees and a neighbor killed, 16 injured in car bomb attack
N/A	February 3, 1948	3	3 Arabs killed near Migdal Zedek after shooting British police
N/A	February 3, 1948	6	6 Jews killed while riding buses in Haifa
N/A	February 7, 1948	6	3 Arabs, 3 Jews killed in Haifa
N/A	February 10, 1948	7	7 Arabs killed near Ras el Ain after selling cows in Tel Aviv
N/A	February 12, 1948	4	4 Jews killed in Jerusalem
N/A	February 15, 1948	8	5 Arabs, 3 Jews killed
Sa'sa' village ambush in the Safad district	February 14, 1948	11-60	Reports vary from 11 Arabs killed, to 60 Arabs killed. Reported to be revenge for Convoy of 35.
N/A	February 17, 1948	8	5 Arabs, 3 Jews killed
N/A	February 17, 1948	57	57 Arabs killed while taking part in attack on Jewish settlements Tirat Tzvi, Sde Eliahu, Ein HaNatziv
Ramla vegetable market bombing	February 18, 1948	12	12 killed, 43 wounded
N/A	February 19, 1948	4	4 Jews killed while riding buses in Haifa
N/A	February 21, 1948	4	4 Arabs killed in Haifa
Ben Yehuda Street bombing	February 22, 1948	49-58	49 to 58 Jewish civilians killed and 140 to 200 injured
N/A	February 25, 1948	3	3 Jews killed on road between Ramle and Tel Aviv
N/A	February 28, 1948	7	6 Arabs, 1 Jew killed during attack on Jewish village Kfar Sava
N/A	February 18, 1948	4	4 Arabs killed while participating in attack on Jewish settlement Mitzpe
Rehovot Train bombing	March 1, 1948	28	28 Britons killed
Bevingrad Officers Club bombing	March 1, 1948	20	20 Britons killed; 30 Britons wounded
N/A	March 1, 1948	4	4 Jews killed on Tel Aviv-Jerusalem road
N/A	March 2, 1948	13	10 Arabs, 3 Jews killed during Arab attack on Tel Aviv-Jerusalem road
N/A	March 3, 1948	11	Car bombing in Haifa killed 11 Arabs
N/A	March 4, 1948	16	16 Jews killed on Jerusalem-Atarot road
N/A	March 9, 1948	3	3 Arabs killed while attacking a Jewish settlement Yehiam
N/A	March 11, 1948	5	4 Arabs, 1 Jew killed in Tiberias
Jewish Agency bombing	March 11, 1948	13	13 Jews killed
N/A	March 14, 1948	7	7 Jews killed near Faluja
N/A	March 14, 1948	5	4 Arabs, 1 Jew killed in Tiberias
N/A	March 18, 1948	9	5 Britons, 4 Jews killed in convoy near Acre
N/A	March 20, 1948	7	7 Jews killed at Ein Harod
N/A	March 21, 1948	6	6 Jews killed on Rosh Pinna-Safed road
N/A	March 22, 1948	24	4 Jews, 20 Arabs during attack on Jewish settlement Nitzanim
N/A	March 24, 1948	36	36 Arabs killed near Tulkarem
N/A	March 26, 1948	8	6 Arabs, 2 Jews killed in attack on Jewish convoy near Gaza
N/A	March 28, 1948	6	6 Arabs killed while participating in attack on Jewish convoy near Rehovot
N/A	March 30, 1948	10	8 Jews and 2 British killed while fleeing from Jaffa
Cairo-Haifa train bombing	March 31, 1948	40	40 Arabs killed; 60 Arabs wounded
Massacre in an orange grove in Lydda	April 1, 1948	11	11 Arab laborers killed
NA	April 5, 1948	10	10 Iraqis killed by Jewish militants in Lydda.
Deir Yassin massacre	April 9, 1948	100-110	100-110 Arabs, 4 Jewish attackers killed
Hadassah medical convoy massacre	April 13, 1948	79	78 Jews (nurses, doctors, and patients) and one British soldier killed. Amongst the dead was Chaim Yassky, the director of Hadassah hospital.
Haifa car bombing	15 April 1948	8	6 Jews, 2 Britons killed. Most of those in the two nearby crowded busses injured
Ein al Zeitun massacre	May 3, 1948	55	37–70 Arab prisoners
Kfar Etzion massacre	May 13, 1948	129	127–157 Jews killed
Abu Shusha massacre	May 13–14, 1948	60–70+	60–70 Arabs killed

== See also ==
- List of Irgun attacks during the 1930s
- Killings and massacres during the 1948 Palestine War
- List of villages depopulated during the Arab-Israeli conflict
- List of massacres in Israel
- List of massacres in the Palestinian territories
- Palestinian political violence
- List of Palestinian suicide attacks

== Sources ==
- Segev, Tom (2001). One Palestine, Complete: Jews and Arabs under the British Mandate. Owl Books. ISBN 0-8050-6587-3.
- Gilbert, Martin (2012). The Routledge Atlas of the Arab-Israeli Conflict. Routledge. ISBN 978-0-415-69975-4.
