= Killings and massacres during the 1948 Palestine war =

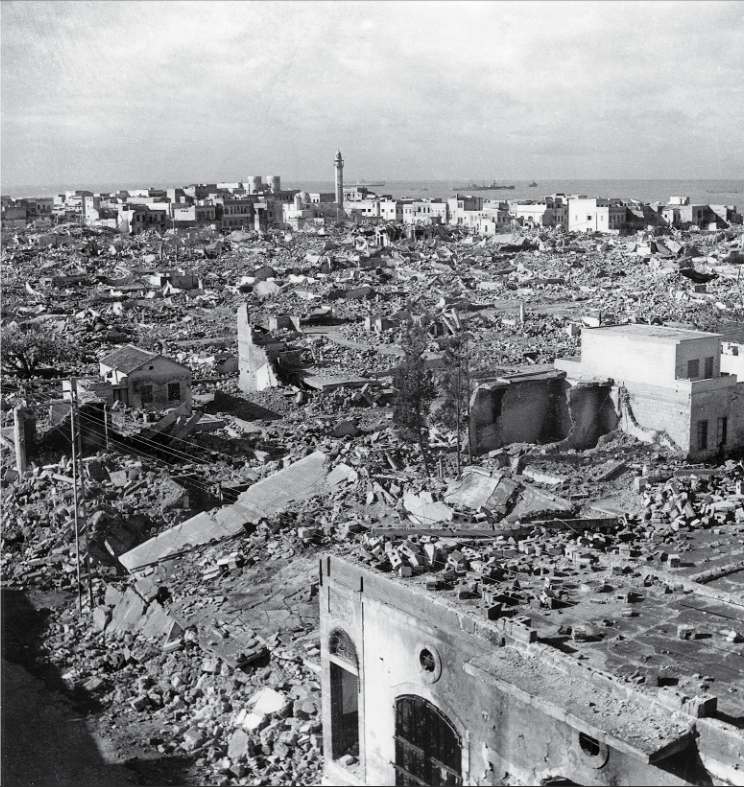
The city of Jaffa in December 1948: the al-Manshiyya neighborhood in ruins—razed and emptied of its Arab inhabitants by the bombardments of the Zionist militia, the Irgun

During the 1948 Palestine war, massacres and acts of terror were conducted by and against both sides. A campaign of massacres and violence against the Arab population – such as occurred in the expulsions from Lydda and Ramle and the Fall of Haifa – led to the expulsion and flight of over 700,000 Palestinians, with most of their urban areas being depopulated and destroyed. This violence and dispossession of the Palestinians is known today as the Nakba (Arabic for "the disaster").

== Background ==
After about 30 years of conflict in Mandatory Palestine between Palestinian Arabs, British authorities and Palestinian Jews, the British decided in February 1947 to terminate the Mandate and, on 29 November 1947, the United Nations General Assembly adopted Resolution 181 (II) recommending the adoption and implementation of a plan to partition Palestine.

The vote was rejected by the Arab parties, and was immediately followed by a civil war between Palestinian Arabs who were supported by the Arab Liberation Army against the Palestinian Jews, while the region was still fully under British rule. The day after the vote, Arabs launched attacks against the Jews, killing 126 of them during the first two weeks and 75 were massacred in a refugee camp in Aden as a retaliation. In Jerusalem, attacks targeted Jewish businesses and residents of Jewish neighborhoods, some of whom were stabbed in the street or murdered on buses. Jews were also attacked in Arab neighborhoods. In the Kibbutz of Gvulot, six Jewish teenage girls were murdered. In major cities, snipers (including mercenaries) fired at Jewish pedestrians and traffic. The Carmel Market was also attacked and grenades were thrown in the Jewish quarters. Across the country, Jewish cars were the target of stone throwing, while the consulates of Poland and Sweden, which voted in favor of partition, were attacked. In December 1947, one of the striking images remains the attack on the new Mamilla Mall.

On 15 May 1948, following the Israeli Declaration of Independence the previous day, the armies of a number of Arab countries invaded what had just ceased to be Mandatory Palestine, turning the conflict into the 1948 Arab–Israeli War. The yishuv (now officially called Israel) suffered between 5,700 and 5,800 casualties. The death toll on the Arab side is unclear, but according to Benny Morris, it might have been slightly higher or much higher than the Jewish one. In his book, Morris mentions an estimate of 12,000 provided by Haj Amin al-Husseini in 1950. These numbers amount to around 1 percent of the population of each side.

== Massacres ==
The 30 November 1947 Palestinian attacks, including ambushes of Jewish buses near Kfar Syrkin, occurred hours after the UN voted to partition Palestine, produced the first fatalities of the 1948 war, and are generally regarded as marking its start.

According to several historians, between 10 and 70 massacres occurred during the 1948 war. According to Benny Morris the Yishuv and later Israeli soldiers killed roughly 800 Arab civilians and prisoners of war in 24 massacres. Aryeh Yizthaki list 10 major massacres with more than 50 victims each. Palestinian researcher Salman Abu-Sitta lists 33 massacres, half of them occurring during the civil war period. Saleh Abdel Jawad lists 68 villages where acts of indiscriminate killing of prisoners, and civilians took place, where no threat was posed to Yishuv or Israeli soldiers.

The main massacres and attacks against Jewish civilians were the Haifa Oil Refinery massacre where 39 Jews were killed by Arab workers after Irgun members had thrown a bomb into the crowd and the Kfar Etzion massacre where around 120–150 residents and defenders were killed by Arab irregulars, according to some accounts with the participation of Arab Legion soldiers. The Hadassah medical convoy massacre, with 80 deaths, included the mass killing of medical personnel by Arabs.

According to Rosemarie Esber, both Israeli archives and Palestinian testimonies confirm killings occurred in numerous Arab villages. Most of these killings occurred as villages were overrun and captured during the Second phase of the Civil War, Operation Dani, Operation Hiram and Operation Yoav. Morris said that the "worst cases" were the Saliha massacre with 60 to 70 killed, the Deir Yassin massacre with around 112, the Lydda massacre with around 250, the Tantura massacre with between 40 and 200+, and the Abu Shusha massacre with 60–70. In Al-Dawayima, accounts of the death toll vary. Saleh Abd al-Jawad reports 100–200 casualties, Morris has estimated "hundreds" and also reports the IDF investigation which concluded 100 villagers had been killed. David Ben-Gurion gave the figure of 70–80. Saleh Abd al-Jawad reports on the village's mukhtar account that 455 people were missing following the al-Dawayima massacre, including 170 women and children.

== Bombing attacks ==
At the beginning of the Civil War, Jewish militias organized several bombing attacks against civilians and military Arab targets. On 12 December 1947, the Irgun placed a car bomb opposite the Damascus Gate, the main entrance to the Old City of Jerusalem, killing 20 people. On 4 January 1948, the Lehi detonated a lorry bomb against the headquarters of the paramilitary al-Najjada located in Jaffa's Town Hall, killing 15 Arabs and injuring 80.

During the night between 5 and 6 January, in Jerusalem, the Haganah bombed the Semiramis Hotel that had been reported to hide Arab militiamen, killing 24 people. The next day, Irgun members in a stolen police van rolled a barrel bomb into a large group of civilians who were waiting for a bus by the Jaffa Gate, killing 20. Another Irgun bomb went off in the Ramla market on 18 February, killing 7 residents and injuring 45. On 28 February, the Palmach organised a bombing attack against a garage in Haifa, killing 30 people.

From 1 February 1948, supporters of Amin al-Husseini organised, with the help of British deserters, three attacks against the Jewish community in Jerusalem. Using car bombs aimed at the headquarters of the Palestine Post, the Ben Yehuda Street market and the backyard of the Jewish Agency's offices, killing 22, 53 and 13 Jewish people respectively.

During the first months of 1948, the railway between Cairo and Haifa was often targeted. On 31 March, it was mined near Binyamina, a Jewish settlement in the neighborhood of Caesarea, killing 40 persons and wounding 60. The casualties were all civilians, mostly Arabs. Although there were some soldiers on the train, none were injured. The Palestine Post and the New York Times attributed the attack to Lehi.

== List of killings and massacres ==
Here is a non-exhaustive list of killings and massacres that took place during the war:

Date	Event	Perpetrators	Victims	Notes
30 November 1947	Fajja bus attacks	Palestinian irregulars	7 Jewish people	One attack killed 5, and another killed 2
2–4 December 1947	1947 Jerusalem riots	Palestinian rioters	8 Jews and 6 Arabs killed	
11/12 Dec 1947	Attack on Balad al-Shaykh	Haganah	6 Palestinians	(Note: Morris 2004, "The first large Haganah reprisal, against the village of Balad al Sheikh, just east of Haifa, took place on 12 December (six Arabs were killed)") (Note: Date of 11 December given in Saleh Abdel Jawad, (2007). Zionist Massacres: the Creation of the Palestinian Refugee Problem in the 1948 War)
11–12 December 1947	Attack on Tirat Haifa	Irgun	13 Palestinians	(Note: Saleh Abdel Jawad, (2007). Zionist Massacres: the Creation of the Palestinian Refugee Problem in the 1948 War. In: Benvenisti, E., Gans, C., Hanafi, S. (eds) Israel and the Palestinian Refugees. Beiträge zum ausländischen öffentlichen Recht und Völkerrecht, vol 189. Springer, Berlin, Heidelberg. https://doi.org/10.1007/978-3-540-68161-8_3. "On 11 and 12 December 1947, the village of Tieret Haifa suffered a terror attack.") (Note: Ilan Pappé, 2006, The Ethnic Cleansing of Palestine. "massacre in Tirat Haifa on 11 December 1947", "The Irgun bombarded it [Tirat Haifa] as early as December 1947, killing thirteen people, mainly children and the elderly. After the shelling a raiding party of twenty Irgun members approached and began firing at an isolated house on the edge of the village.")
13 December 1947	Attack on Al-'Abbasiyya / Yahudiya	Irgun	Unknown. The New York Times reported the following day that seven Palestinian villagers were killed	
18 December 1947	Al-Khisas massacre	Palmach	10–15 Palestinian villagers, including 5 children	(Note: Pappé 2006, "Fifteen villagers, including five children, were killed in the attack.") (Note: Benny Morris, 1948 and After (1990), "ten Arab civilians, including five children")
28 December 1947	Attack in Lifta	Zionist forces (Note: Sources differ as to which organization perpetrated the attack.)	6–7 Palestinians	(Note: Walid Khalidi, All That Remains (1991), "Palestinian historian 'Arif al-'Arif adds that a coffeehouse in Lifta was attacked on 28 December with Sten guns and submachine-guns, and that six of the patrons were killed and seven wounded.") (Note: Pappe 2006, "One of the coffee houses was the target of the Hagana when it attacked on 28 December 1947. Armed with machine guns the Jews sprayed the coffee house, while members of the Stern Gang stopped a bus nearby and began firing into it randomly.) (Note: Krystall, Nathan. "The De-Arabization of West Jerusalem 1947–50." Journal of Palestine Studies 27, no. 2 (1998): 5–22. https://doi.org/10.2307/2538281. "Most residents of Lifta left the village soon after a series of Haganah and Irgun attacks in late December killed seven people") (Note: Avinoam Shalem, Lifta's Silence and the Making of the Uncanny Landscape of Palestine (2023), doi: https://doi.org/10.11588/kb.2023.4.99761. "One of the coffeehouses was attacked by the Zionist right-wing group Stern, killing six and wounding seven.")
29 December 1947	Damascus Gate bombing	Irgun	15–17 Palestinians	(Note: John Bowyer Bell, 1977, Terror out of Zion: Irgun Zvai Leumi, LEHI, and the Palestine Underground, 1929–1949, "Irgun attempts at retaliation were brutal, ruthless, and ineffectual. On December 29, a bomb at the Damascus Gate in Jerusalem detonated in the midst of a crowd. Fifteen Arabs were killed and over fifty wounded.") (Note: Bose, Sumantra. Contested Lands: Israel-Palestine, Kashmir, Bosnia, Cyprus, and Sri Lanka. Harvard University Press, 2007. https://doi.org/10.2307/j.ctv1pncnv2. "On 29 December 1947, Irgun men hurled grenades into an Arab crowd gathered at the Nablus Gate to Jerusalem's old city, killing seventeen")
30 December 1947	Attack at Haifa Oil Refinery	Irgun	6 Palestinians	Grenades thrown into a crowd of Arab workers outside the Haifa Oil Refinery. Attack precipitates the Haifa Oil Refinery massacre.
30 December 1947	Haifa Oil Refinery massacre	Mob of Palestinian workers	39–41 Jewish workers	Jewish workers of the Haifa Oil Refinery killed by Arab co-workers after Irgun bombing.
31 December 1947	Balad al-Shaykh massacre, Haifa	Palmach	Between 60 and 70 Palestinian villagers	Retaliation for the Haifa Oil Refinery massacre. The raiding unit's orders were to 'kill maximum adult males.'
4 January 1948	Bombing at Jaffa 'Saraya' building	Irgun	26 Palestinians	(Note: Flapan, S. (1987) The Birth of Israel: Myths and Realities. "On January 4, 1948, the Irgun used a car bomb to blow up the government center in Jaffa, killing twenty-six Arab civilians.) (Note: Pappé 2006, "In the first week of January alone the Irgun executed more terrorist attacks than in any period before. These included detonating a bomb in the Sarraya house in Jaffa, the seat of the local national committee, which collapsed leaving twenty-six people dead.") (Note: Walid Khalidi, 1984, Before Their Diaspora: A Photographic History of the Palestinians 1876–1948, "January 4: Irgun uses car bomb to blow up Grand Serai (government center) in Jaffa, killing 26 Palestinian civilians.")
5 January 1948	Semiramis Hotel bombing, Jerusalem	Haganah	24–26 Palestinians and 1 foreign diplomat	
7 January 1948	Bomb attack at Jaffa Gate, Jerusalem	Irgun	25 Palestinians	(Note: Flapan, S. (1987) The Birth of Israel: Myths and Realities. "On January 4, 1948, the Irgun used a car bomb to blow up the government center in Jaffa, killing twenty-six Arab civilians. Three days later, they planted explosives at Jaffa Gate in Jerusalem, and another twenty-five Arab civilians were killed.)
1–2 February 1948	Bombing of The Palestine Post headquarters	British Army deserters and Palestinian irregulars	3 Jewish journalists killed, 16 injured	
14–15 Feb 1948	Sa'sa' massacre, Safed	Palmach	60 Palestinian villagers	60 Arabs killed inside their houses, including small children; 16 houses were demolished. Considered a model raid by Israeli forces.
22 February 1948	Ben Yehuda Street bombing, Jerusalem	British deserters and Arab irregulars	49 to 58 Jewish civilians	Killing 49 to 58 Jewish civilians and injuring 140. Arab High Command took responsibility, imploring the Jewish community to stick to the rules of war.
3 March 1948	Car-bombing in Haifa	Lehi	11 Palestinians	(Note: Bose, Sumantra. Contested Lands: Israel-Palestine, Kashmir, Bosnia, Cyprus, and Sri Lanka. Harvard University Press, 2007. https://doi.org/10.2307/j.ctv1pncnv2. "On 3 March a Stern Gang car bombing in Haifa killed eleven Arabs")
11 March 1948	Bomb attack at Jewish Agency headquarters in Jerusalem	Arab forces	13 Jewish non-combatants	
12–13 March 1948	Attack on al-Husayniyya, Safad	Palmach	15 Palestinian villagers per Walid Khalidi (Note: Khalidi 1992, p.456 "Fifteen Arabs were killed and twenty wounded")	Attack by Palmach's Third Battalion. (Note: Morris 2004, "a Palmah strike against Husseiniyya on the night of 12–13 March. A number of houses were reportedly blown up and several dozen Arabs, who included members of an Iraqi volunteer contingent and women and children, were killed and another 20 wounded.")
16–17 March 1948	Attack on al-Husayniyya, Safad	Palmach	Unknown. Estimates range from "dozens" to 30+	Attack by Palmach's Third Battalion. (Note: Khalidi 1992, p.456, "on 16–17 March, "more than 30 Arab adults (excluding women and children) were killed" in another attack on al-Husayniyya, according to a report filed by a Palmach battalion. The total death toll was put at dozens by Israeli sources, and the village was said to have been abandoned by all its residents, who "fled across the border."")
31 March 1948	Cairo–Haifa train bombing	Lehi	40 Palestinians killed, 60 injured	(Note: Nur Masalha, 1992, Expulsion of the Palestinians: The Concept of "Transfer" in Zionist Political Thought, 1882–1948. "The Stern Gang's blowing up of the Cairo-Haifa passenger train (forty Arab civilians killed, sixty injured) in March 1948")
9 April 1948	Deir Yassin massacre, Jerusalem	Irgun and Lehi, supported by Palmach	107–140 Palestinian villagers	
12 April 1948	Attack on Nasr al-Din	Golani Brigade	Unknown. At least 12–20 Palestinians	(Note: Morris 2004, "On the 12th, a company of the 12th Battalion, Golani Brigade, attacked and captured the small tenant farmer village of Khirbet Nasir ad Din", "The Haganah recorded 22 Arabs killed, six wounded and three captured (Haganah casualties were two lightly wounded). The Arabs subsequently alleged that 'there had been a second Deir Yassin' in Nasir ad Din – and, indeed, some non-combatants, including women and children, were killed.") (Note: Jawad, S.A. (2007). Zionist Massacres: the Creation of the Palestinian Refugee Problem in the 1948 War. "12 April 1948: Nasir al-Deen and Sheikh Qadumi hill (Tiberias area): Indiscriminate killings occur. The two locations are attacked by Haganah's Golani Brigade to aid the demoralisation of the besieged city of Tiberias. 12–20 civilians are massacred by machine guns and homes in Nasir al-Deen and Sheikh Qadumi are blown up. The majority of the dead are women and children.")
13 April 1948	Hadassah medical convoy massacre, Jerusalem	Arab forces	79 Jewish doctors, nurses, members of Haganah and scientists and 1 British soldier.	Arab retaliation for the Deir Yassin massacre.
15 April 1948	Haifa car bombing	Arab terrorist	6 Jews and 2 British killed.	
21–22 April 1948	Battle of Haifa	Haganah	Unknown number of Palestinians, Jon Kimche wrote that "the actual number of Arab casualties in the fighting in Haifa on April 21st and 22nd was about 300 killed." (Note: This number does not appear to distinguish between civilians and combatants.)	(Note: Saleh Abdel Jawad, 2007, Zionist Massacres: the Creation of the Palestinian Refugee Problem in the 1948 War. "Mass indiscriminate killings occur.")
2 May 1948	Ein al-Zeitun massacre, Safed	Palmach	70+ Palestinian villagers	Ein al-Zeitun completely depopulated after the Palmach captured the village.
4 May 1948	Killings at Kafr 'Ana	Haganah	10 Palestinians	(Note: Saleh Abdel Jawad, 2007, Zionist Massacres: the Creation of the Palestinian Refugee Problem in the 1948 War. "4 May 1948: Kofr Ana (Lod area): Indiscriminate killings occur. The village is demoralised and occupied after a period of resistance. Ten civilians are killed on the day of the occupation. Those murdered are either elderly people, who remained in the village, or men, who attempted to flee.")
12–13 May 1948	Attack on Burayr	Palmach	50 Palestinians	(Note: Jawad, S.A. (2007). Zionist Massacres: the Creation of the Palestinian Refugee Problem in the 1948 War. Quotation: "And then civilians, including women, children and the elderly, are systematically massacred in the surrounding houses. 20 combatants and 50 civilians are killed.") (Note: Morris 2004 "Burayr, northeast of Gaza, was taken on 12–13 May. Its inhabitants fled to Gaza. The 9th Battalion troops killed a large number of villagers, apparently executing dozens of army-age males.") (Note: W Khalidi 1992, "During the night of 12–13 May, the Palmach's Negev Brigade struck at the village in coordination with the Giv'ati Brigade's Operation Barak") (Note: Haaretz, 27 Feb 2026, Adam Raz, Terror Was Needed to Make Arabs Leave: What the Israeli Army Did in 1948, Revealed. Quotation: "Six massacres exacted between 50 and 100 victims: [...] in the village of Bureir north of Gaza.")
12–14 May 1948	Sabbarin	Irgun	20+ Palestinians	(Note: Jawad 2007: "Indiscriminate killings occur. A section of the IZL attack four villages [...] Civilians who flee are massacred after a short battle. About 20 people die. Over 100 people remain. All or a part of the elderly, women and children are forced into a house, which is blown up by troops.")
13 May 1948	Kfar Etzion massacre, Hebron	Arab forces	157 Jewish residents and Haganah soldiers	
13–19 May 1948	Abu Shusha massacre, Ramle	Givati Brigade	60–70 Palestinian villagers	In 1995, a mass grave near the site with 52 bodies was unearthed.
19 May 1948	1948 Tel Aviv bus station bombing, Tel Aviv	Egyptian Air Force	42	100 people were wounded and 42 killed in an attack on a bus station.
20 May 1948	Al-Kabri massacre	Carmeli Brigade	At least 7 Palestinian villagers killed	
22 May 1948	Tantura massacre	Haganah, Alexandroni Brigade	Unknown. Estimates range from "dozens" to 200+	
~10–12 July 1948	Attack on Lydda and Ramle	3rd Battalion of the IDF	Unknown. Estimates range from hundreds to 1,000+ (Note: Palumbo 1987; "In all, probably about 1,000 Arab civilians died during and immediately after the expulsion from Lydda-Ramle.") (Note: Nimr al-Khatib estimated 1,700 killed.) (Note: Saleh Abdel Jawad, 2007, Zionist Massacres: the Creation of the Palestinian Refugee Problem in the 1948 War: "1,000 casualties, for example in the many phases of the Lod massacre (our estimation)")	
15 July 1948	Israeli bombing of Cairo	IDF, 69 Squadron	30 Egyptian civilians	Carried out during the break of fast during Ramadan.
2 September 1948	Attack on Hunin	Palmach	20 Palestinian villagers	
28 October 1948	Al-Dawayima massacre, Hebron	IDF, 89th Commando Battalion, with former Irgun, and Lehi members.	80 to 200 Palestinians	News of the massacre was suppressed by both Israeli (to prevent UN scrutiny) and Arab forces (in order to prevent morale from collapsing as it did after the Deir Yassin massacre).
29 October 1948	Safsaf massacre, Safed	7th Armored Brigade	52–70 Palestinian villagers	Between 52 and 70 Arab men shot, killed, and burned in a pit. Several women were raped.
29 October 1948	Jish massacre	IDF	Unknown number of Palestinians	(Note: Saleh Abdel Jawad, (2007). Zionist Massacres: the Creation of the Palestinian Refugee Problem in the 1948 War. In: Benvenisti, E., Gans, C., Hanafi, S. (eds) Israel and the Palestinian Refugees. Beiträge zum ausländischen öffentlichen Recht und Völkerrecht, vol 189. Springer, Berlin, Heidelberg. https://doi.org/10.1007/978-3-540-68161-8_3. "Sources emphasise different details, but agree that civilians and fighters who had surrendered are rounded up and killed. Those killed include four Maronite Christians, a woman and her baby, ten Moroccan prisoners, and surrendered soldiers. There are at least 100 fatalities (author's estimate).") (Note: Morris 2004, "In Jish, the troops apparently murdered about 10 Moroccan POWs (who had served with the Syrian Army) and a number of civilians, including, apparently, four Maronite Christians, and a woman and her baby.")
30 October 1948	Saliha massacre, Safed	7th Armoured Brigade	60–70 Palestinians	Village completely depopulated.
30 October 1948	Eilabun massacre, Tiberias	Golani Brigade's 12th Battalion	14 Palestinian villagers	13 were executed, 11 from Eilabun (Christians) and 2 refugees (Muslims). Massacre was documented by the UN.
30 October 1948	Sa'sa' massacre, Safed	IDF	Unknown number of Palestinians	(Note: Jawad, S.A. (2007). Zionist Massacres: the Creation of the Palestinian Refugee Problem in the 1948 War. In: Benvenisti, E., Gans, C., Hanafi, S. (eds) Israel and the Palestinian Refugees. Beiträge zum ausländischen öffentlichen Recht und Völkerrecht, vol 189. Springer, Berlin, Heidelberg. https://doi.org/10.1007/978-3-540-68161-8_3. "30 October [...] Indiscriminate killings occur. Many villagers, including cripples, are massacred after the surrender of the village.") (Note: Khalidi 1992, "The second massacre was perpetrated on 30 October, at the time that the village was occupied, during Operation Hiram") (Note: Morris 2004, "Civilians appear to have been murdered in Sa'sa as well.")
31 October 1948	Hula massacre, Lebanon	Carmeli Brigade	35–58 Arab villagers	Hula was captured without resistance. The commander, first lieutenant Shmuel Lahis, was given seven years in jail for his role in the incident but served only one.
2 November 1948	Arab al-Mawasi massacre, Tiberias	IDF	14 Arab Bedouin men	15 Bedouin men from Khirbat al-Wa'ra al-Sawda' taken near Eilabun and shot. One survived. Village was completely obliterated.
5 November 1948	Majd al-Kurum massacre, Galilee	IDF	9 Palestinians	(Note: Morris 2004 "The soldiers selected five men and, according to a UN report, 'lined them up alongside a wall next to the water pump and shot them'. The soldiers then searched the houses, killing another four inhabitants, including two women, in the process.")
Date unknown/unspecified	Kafr 'Inan	Zionist/Israeli forces	"A few dozen" Palestinians	
Date unknown/unspecified	Beersheba	Zionist/Israeli forces	"A few dozen" Palestinians	

== Effects ==
Violence against Palestinians had a strong impact on the exodus of the Palestinian Arab population. For example, the Deir Yassin massacre is considered to have generated more panic among the Arab population than all other previous operations together and to have caused a mass flight of Palestinians in numerous areas, Additionally, the Deir Yassin massacre became a strong argument for the Arab states to intervene against Israel. Arab League chief Azzam Pasha stated that 'The massacre of Deir Yassin was to a great extent the cause of the wrath of the Arab nations and the most important factor for sending [in] the Arab armies'.

== Historiography ==
=== New Historians ===
In the 1980s a group of revisionist Israeli historians, known as the New Historians, challenged the official Israeli historical narrative.

=== Arab warnings and threats of massacres against Jews of Palestine ===
After the Partition vote, some Arab leaders threatened the Jewish population of Palestine. For example, they spoke of "driving the Jews into the sea" or ridding Palestine "of the Zionist Plague".

According to the Israeli traditional historiography, these statements reflected the Arab intentions. While Benny Morris considers the real picture of the Arab aims to be more complex, notably because they were well aware they could not defeat the Jews, he argues that the Yishuv was indeed threatened with extinction and feared what would happen if the Arabs won. Gelber, on the other hand, regards these public statements as 'meaningless' and judges that the 'actions [of their armies] imply that the aims of the Arab invasion were decidedly limited and focused mainly on saving Arab Palestine from total Jewish domination'.

=== "Purity of arms" ===
During the conflict between Arabs and Jews in Palestine before the war, the criterion of "purity of arms" was used to distinguish between the respective attitudes of the Irgun and Haganah towards Arabs, with the latter priding itself on its adherence to this principle. Generally speaking, this precept requires that "weapons remain pure [and that] they are employed only in self-defence and [never] against innocent civilians and defenceless people". But if it "remained a central value in education" it was "rather vague and intentionally blurred" at the practical level.

In 1946, at a meeting held between the heads of the Haganah, Ben-Gurion predicted a confrontation between the Arabs of Palestine and the Arab states. Concerning the "principle of purity of arms", he stressed that: "The end does not justify all means. Our war is based on moral grounds" and during the 1948 War, the Mapam, the political party affiliated to Palmach, asked for "a strict observance of the Jewish Purity of arms to secure the moral character of [the] war".

When he was criticized by Mapam members for his attitude concerning the Arab refugee problem, Ben-Gurion reminded them the events of Lydda and Ramla and the fact Palmach officers had been responsible for the "outrage that had encouraged the Arabs' flight made the party uncomfortable."

According to Avi Shlaim, "purity of arms" is one of the key features of 'the conventional Zionist account or old history' whose 'popular-heroic-moralistic version of the 1948 war' is 'taught in Israeli schools and used extensively in the quest for legitimacy abroad'. Morris adds that '[t]he Israelis' collective memory of fighters characterized by "purity of arms" is also undermined by the evidence of [the dozen case] of rapes committed in conquered towns and villages.' According to him, 'after the war, the Israelis tended to hail the "purity of arms" of its militiamen and soldiers to contrast this with Arab barbarism, which on occasion expressed itself in the mutilation of captured Jewish corpses.' According to him, 'this reinforced the Israelis' positive self-image and helped them "sell" the new state abroad and (...) demonized the enemy'.

=== Causes of massacres ===
According to Ilan Pappé, massacres targeting Palestinians took place in the context of an ethnic cleansing that "carr[ied] with it atrocious acts of mass killing and butchering of thousands of Palestinians were killed ruthlessly and savagely by Israeli troops of all backgrounds, ranks and ages."

Morris also said that despite their rhetoric, Arab armies committed few atrocities and no large-scale massacre of prisoners took place when circumstances might have allowed them to happen, as when they took the Old City of Jerusalem or the villages of Atarot, Neve Yaakov, Nitzanim, Gezer and Mishmar Hayarden. On 28 May, when the inhabitants and fighters of the Old City surrendered, in fear for their lives, the Transjordanian Arab Legion protected them from the mob and even wounded or shot dead other Arabs. Atrocities committed by the Arab armies included women being dismembered in Nitzanim in June, 14 Jewish civilians killed while supplying an orphanage in Ben Shemen and Arab fighters parading with the heads of two Israeli soldiers impaled on stakes in Eilabun. Jewish combatants captured by Arab militias, were frequently tortured and mutilated in particularly violent ways. Pregnant women have also been found disembowelled.

With regard to massacres perpetrated by the IDF at the end of the war and particularly during Operation Hiram, Morris and Yoav Gelber consider that lack of discipline cannot explain the violence. Gelber points out the "hard feelings [of the soldiers] towards the Palestinians" and the fact that the Palestinians had not fled like in former operations. Benny Morris thinks that they were related to a "general vengefulness and a desire by local commanders to precipitate a civilian exodus".

=== Tantura massacre controversy ===
There was a significant controversy regarding the Tantura massacre, with some historians such as Yoav Gelber denying that a massacre had taken place.

Gelber wrote that based on a counting of the inhabitants, the refugees, the POW's and the deaths, there were no people missing and therefore no massacre could have occurred.

Morris's analysis concludes that the documentation and the interviews do not prove that a massacre occurred but that the hypothesis cannot be simply dismissed. Ilan Pappé considers that the testimonies of former Alexandroni soldiers and Palestinian refugees prove, on the contrary, that at least 200 unarmed Tantura villagers were killed, whether in revenge for the death of Israeli soldiers due to sniper shots or later when they were unjustifiably accused of hiding weapons.

=== Palestinian historiography ===
Nadine Picaudou, author of The Historiography of the 1948 Wars, studied the evolution of Palestinian historiography on the 1948 war. She argues that the Deir Yassin massacre long remained the only one discussed 'as if it sufficed to summarize the tragedy of Palestinian victims'. She thinks that during the period for which 'collective memory conflated with Palestinian nationalist mobilization, one exemplary event sufficed to express the tragedy'. Referring to the study performed in 2007 by Saleh Abd al-Jawad, Zionist Massacres: the Creation of the Palestinian Refugee Problem in the 1948 War, she writes that the massacres engaged Palestinian historians' concerns relatively late, but that when "Palestinians began to write their history, the issue of massacres inevitably became one of the relevant factors in accounting for the mass exodus."

Picaudou underlines that "Palestinian historiography has retained the nakba paradigm, which reduces the Palestinians to the status of passive victims of Israeli policies, as [illustrated by] the limited attention accorded by researchers to the 1947–48 battles (...)".

=== "Battles" or "massacres" ===
In the context of the 1948 war, several historians pointed out the nuance, sometimes polemically, that can exist between a "battle" and a "massacre".

==== Deir Yassin ====
The village of Deir Yassin was located west of Jerusalem, but its strategic importance was debatable and its inhabitants had not participated in the war until one week before the attack. On 9 April, around 120 men from the Irgun and the Lehi attacked the village in the context of the Operation Nachshon. The poorly armed inhabitants showed unexpected resistance to the attack by fighting back. The assailants suffered four dead. Jacques de Reynier, head of the International Red Cross delegation in Palestine, visited Deir Yassin on 11 April 1948, and observed "a total of more than 200 dead, men, women, and children." After the fighting, some villagers were executed after being exhibited in the streets of Jerusalem. A group of prisoners were executed in a nearby quarry and others at Sheikh Bader. Historians estimate today the total number of deaths at 100 to 120.

In 2007, Israeli military historian Uri Milstein published a controversial book, Blood Libel at Deir Yassin, in which he claims that the events of Deir Yassin were the result of a battle and not of a massacre. Moreover, he goes further and rejects the reality of the atrocities that followed the attack on the village. Morris considers that the capture of the village, insignificant on the military point of view, can hardly be considered as a "battle".

==== Hadassah medical convoy ====
In 1948, Hadassah hospital was located in the enclave of the Mount Scopus, at Jerusalem from where it dominated several Arab quarters. On 14 April, a convoy carrying medical personnel, some injured fighters, munitions and some reinforcement troops, that was protected by Haganah soldiers and armoured cars, tried to reach the enclave. Arab fighters had been informed by an Australian officer that the convoy's mission was to use the enclave to attack Arab quarters and cut off the road to Ramallah. A large Arab force then ambushed the convoy, and, in the fight, several vehicles were shot up, and couldn't withdraw. The battle raged for seven hours and British intervention was late in coming. 79 people from the convoy were killed, mainly civilians. Following the incident, Jacques de Reynier urged that in future all convoys be relieved of military escorts and placed under Red Cross protection. This was quickly agreed to. He also asked that the enclave be demilitarised under similar conditions, but this was refused by the Zionist authorities.

While the whole event is usually seen as a massacre, Morris considers it to have been, rather, a battle, given that there was shooting between Arab and Haganah militia and targeted a supply convoy headed for Mount Scopus. He points out however that the death toll incurred by medical personal, who were unarmed, was massive and that seventy-eight people were "slaughtered".

==== Lydda ====
In July 1948, the Israelis launched the Operation Danny to conquer the cities of Lydda and Ramle. The first attack on Lydda occurred on the afternoon of 11 July when the 89th battalion mounted on armoured cars and jeeps raided the city "spraying machine-gun fire at anything that moved". "Dozens of Arabs (perhaps as many as 200)" were killed. According to Morris, the description of this raid written by one of the soldiers "combine[s] elements of a battle and a massacre".

Later, Israeli troops entered the city and took up position in the town center. The only resistance came from the police fort that was held by some Arab Legionnaires and irregulars. Detention compounds were arranged in the mosques and the churches for adult males and 300–400 Israeli soldiers garrisoned the town. In the morning of 12 July, the situation was calm but around 11:30 an incident occurred; two or three armored cars entered the town and a firefight erupted. The skirmish made Lydda's townspeople believe that the Arab Legion was counter-attacking and probably a few dozen snipers fired against the occupying troops. Israeli soldiers felt threatened, vulnerable because they were isolated among thousands of hostile townspeople and 'angry [because] they had understood that the town had surrendered'. '[They] were told to shoot 'at any clear target' or, alternatively, at anyone 'seen on the streets'. The Arab inhabitants panicked. Many rushed in the streets and were killed.

There is controversy among historians about the events that followed. According to Morris, at the Dahmash mosque some prisoners tried to break out and escape, probably fearing to be massacred. IDF threw grenades and fired rockets at the compound and several dozens Arabs were shot and killed. The Palestinian historiography describes the events differently. According to it, it was civilians that had taken refuge in the mosque, thinking that the Israelis would not dare to profane the sanctuary. The Israelis killed all the people there making 93 to 176 dead. Alon Kadish and Avraham Sela write that there is a confusion between two mosques. According to them, detainees were only gathered around the Great Mosque, where no incident occurred and it is a group of 50–60 armed Arabs who barricaded in the Dahmash mosque. Its storming resulted in the death of 30 Arab militiamen and civilians, including elderly, women and children.

The deaths of 12 July are regarded in the Arab world and by several historians as a massacre. Walid Khalidi calls it "an orgy of indiscriminate killing." Morris writes that the "jittery Palmahniks massacr[ed] detainees in a mosque compound." According to Gelber, it was a "bloodier massacre" than at Deir Yassin. Alon Kadish and Avraham Sela write that it was "an intense battle where the demarcation between civilians, irregular combatants and regular army units hardly existed."

== See also ==
- Israeli war crimes
- List of towns and villages depopulated during the 1947–1949 Palestine war
- List of killings and massacres in Mandatory Palestine
- List of massacres in Israel
