= Arab al-Mawasi massacre =

1948 Israeli massacre of Bedouin village

- Part of the 1948 Palestine war
- Location: Khirbat al-Wa'ra al-Sawda', Mandatory Palestine
- Date: November 2, 1948
- Deaths: 14 Palestinian Arabs
- Injuries: 2 Palestinian Arabs
- Perpetrator: Israel Defense Forces

On November 2, 1948, two squads of Israel Defense Forces soldiers captured a Palestinian Bedouin village in Khirbat al-Wa'ra al-Sawda in Tiberias Subdistrict, Mandatory Palestine. While some soldiers guarded over the residents, others went to a nearby hilltop, where the headless bodies of two Israeli soldiers were found. In retaliation, the Bedouin homes were destroyed and 15 to 16 adult males were shot, 14 of whom died.

Most of the victims were members of the 'Arab Al-Mawasi clan. Their bodies were buried in a cave adjacent to the place where they were killed. In the 1950s, the Israeli National Water Project was dug through the cave, and the Mawasi people took the bones to another cave. During the 1980s, the bones were moved to a common grave in the Muslim cemetery in Eilabun.

== Sources ==
- Morris, Benny (2001). Revisiting the Palestinian Exodus of 1948. In The War for Palestine, Eugene L. Rogan and Avi Shlaim (Eds.). Cambridge: Cambridge University Press, p. 57 (citing Israel Defense Forces Archives 1096\1949\\65). ISBN 0-521-79476-5
- Khalidi, Walid (ed.) (1992), All That Remains. Washington: Institute for Palestine Studies, 1992. ISBN 0-88728-224-5
- Sorek, Tamir (2015). Palestinian Commemoration in Israel: Calendars, Monuments, and Martyrs. Stanford, CA: Stanford University Press. ISBN 9780804795180.

== See also ==
- Killings and massacres during the 1948 Palestine war
- Nakba
