= Hadassah medical convoy massacre =

1948 attack by Arab forces in Jerusalem

Coordinates: 31.7931°N 35.2325°E

Hadassah convoy massacre
- Part of 1947–48 Civil War in Mandatory Palestine
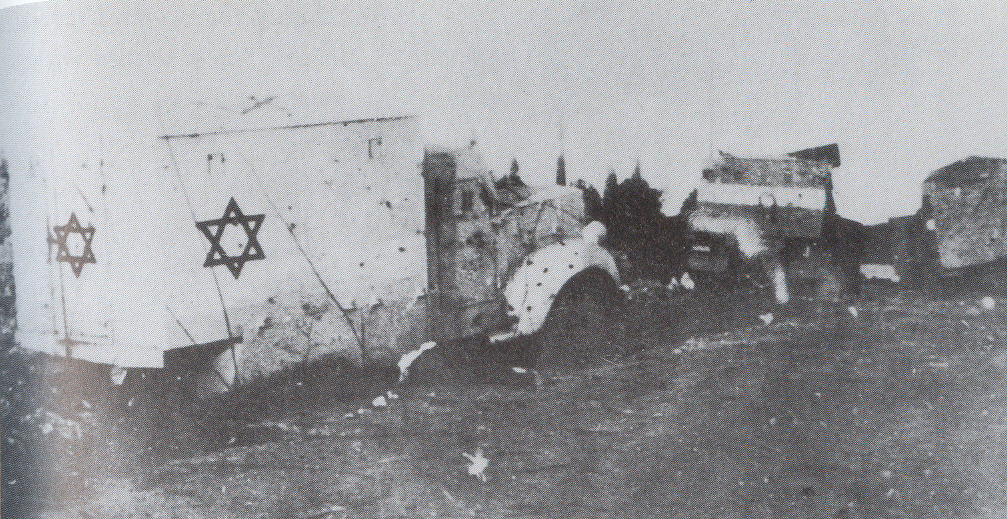
- Aftermath of the attack on the convoy.
- Location: Mount Scopus, Jerusalem
- Date: April 13, 1948; 78 years ago
- Target: Mixed military and medical convoy
- Weapons: Small arms fire, Molotov cocktails, machine guns
- Deaths: 79 (including doctors, nurses, students, patients, faculty members, Haganah fighters and a British soldier)
- Injuries: 20
- Perpetrators: Palestinian irregulars, led by Mohammed Abdel Najar and Adil Abd Latif, both lieutenants of then recently killed Abdul Qadir al-Husayni
- Defender: Haganah

The Hadassah convoy massacre took place on April 13, 1948, when a convoy, escorted by Haganah militia, bringing medical and military supplies and personnel to Hadassah Hospital on Mount Scopus, Jerusalem, was ambushed by Arab forces. Seventy-eight Jewish doctors, nurses, students, patients, faculty members and Haganah fighters, and one British soldier were killed in the attack, including twenty three women. Dozens of unidentified bodies, burned beyond recognition, were buried in a mass grave in the Sanhedria Cemetery.

The Jewish Agency claimed that the massacre was a gross violation of international humanitarian law, and demanded action be taken against a breach of the Geneva Conventions. The Arabs claimed they had attacked a military formation, that all members of the convoy had engaged in combat, and that it had been impossible to distinguish combatants from civilians. An enquiry was conducted. Eventually an agreement was reached to separate military from humanitarian convoys. It was undertaken as a retaliation after the Deir Yassin massacre five days earlier on 9 April, in which Zionist militant groups of Irgun and Lehi massacred at least 107 Arab villagers, including women and children.

== Mount Scopus blockade ==
In 1948, following the UN Partition Plan and anticipating Israel's declaration of independence, Arab troops blocked access to Hadassah Hospital and the Hebrew University campus on Mount Scopus, Jerusalem. The only access was via a narrow road, a mile and a half long passing through the Arab neighbourhood of Sheikh Jarrah, which the Arabs had seeded with mines that could be detonated by electrical triggering at a distance. The Haganah had used Mount Scopus as an outpost and a base for a raid on the village of Wadi al-Joz on February 26, as part of the struggle between Jewish and Arab militias over control of transportation routes in north Jerusalem. The area covered by the Hadassah hospital had great strategic importance, since it allowed one to take the Arab lines from their rear.

At 2:05 pm March 2, the operator at Hadassah Hospital in Jerusalem received a phone call from an Arab caller who warned that the hospital would be blown up within 90 minutes, but there was no bomb.

At a press conference on March 17, the leader of the Arab forces in Jerusalem, Abdul Kader Husseini, threatened that Hadassah Hospital and Hebrew University would be captured or destroyed. He went on record as declaring, "Since Jews have been attacking us and blowing up houses containing women and children from bases in Hadassah Hospital and Hebrew University, I have given orders to occupy or even demolish them." Husseini was subsequently killed on April 8 while reconnoitering the Kastel to block relief convoys to Jerusalem. This factor, according to Marlin Levin, also influenced the decision to attack the convoy. Revenge for this and retaliation for the Deir Yassin Massacre five days earlier on April 9, in which Zionist militant groups of Irgun and Lehi massacred at least 107 Arab Palestinian villages, including women and children, inspired two of Husseini's lieutenants, Mohammed Abdel Najar and Adil Abd Latif, to undertake the assault.

Arab sniper fire on vehicles moving along the access route had become a regular occurrence, and road mines had been laid. The British Colonial Secretary and the High Commissioner had given assurances that the relief convoys would be given British protection. The Red Cross had offered to put Mount Scopus under its flag on condition that the area be demilitarized, but the Hadassah leaders declined the proposal, though a plan was prepared for an eventual evacuation if the authorities could not ensure the daily passage of three convoys. Unless this could be done, the only alternative was to accept the Red Cross offer. Jerusalem's 100,000 Jews depended on its services, wherever it was located. Dr Yassky had found suitable quarters for the hospital in Jerusalem and was preparing to make arrangements for the transfer of the hospital there.

When food and supplies at the hospital begun to dwindle, a large convoy carrying doctors and supplies set out for the besieged hospital, marked by a "red shield", which should have guaranteed its neutrality. The British commander of Jerusalem assured the Jews that the road was safe. For the preceding month, a tacit truce had been in place and the passage of convoys had taken place without serious incident. On April 11, the regional British commander gave assurances the road was safe, but noted that, after the Deir Yassin massacre, tensions were high. According to Henry Laurens, an Australian officer tipped off the combatants of the Arab quarter through which the convoy had to pass, that the men of the Haganah had a mission to use the enclave to attack the Arab quarters and cut the route to Ramallah, and that, acting on this information, the Arabs then set up an ambush.

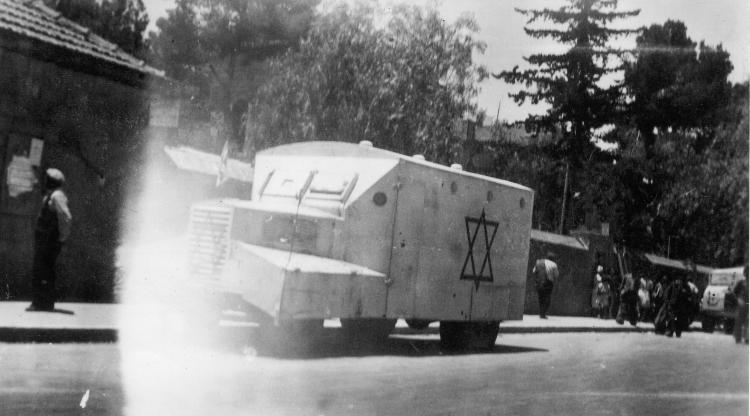
An ambulance preparing to join the convoy to Mount Scopus. April 13, 1948

== Attack ==
On April 13, the convoy, comprising ten vehicles (two ambulances, three buses of medical staff, and three logistical trucks, escorted by two Haganah armoured cars), set off for the hospital at 9.30 am. They carried 105 passengers. It was commanded by the Jerusalem Haganah Lieutenant Asher Rahav, who escorted convoys in an armoured Ford truck. The line was ordered so that Rahav's vehicle headed the column, followed by the two ambulances, then the buses and the three supply trucks, with another escort car taking up the rear. The Sheikh Jarrah Quarter provided an ideal position for an ambush in a small stretch of the road between Nashashibi Bend and the Shepherd Hotel, where a small unit of twelve men from the British Highland Light Infantry armed with a heavy machine gun and bazookas were stationed. It stood some 200 yards (180 m) from the eventual site of the ambush. The local British inspector, Robert J. Webb, head of the Mea Shearim police station, usually travelled the road beforehand to ascertain if the route was safe. On this particular day, he said over the phone that the route was secure, but did not make his customary excursion to the Nashashibi bend where he could confirm this.

Rahav noticed several odd circumstances along the road: little traffic, closed shops, and Arabs in Iraqi uniform with bandoliers. At approximately 9:45 am, a mine was electrically detonated five feet in front of Rahav's Ford, which contained a contingent of ten soldiers and two hitchhiking Haganah members. The truck tilted into a ditch. At the same time, the convoy came under raking fire from Arab forces. Five vehicles managed to back out and return to base, while the rear Haganah escort car inexplicably wheeled about and returned to Jerusalem. Abdel Najar's ambush unit numbered around forty, and were later joined by men commanded by Mohammed Gharbieh, and many other fighters alerted to the battle.

British and Palmach forces were slow to come to the convoy's assistance. The Jewish liaison officer with the British army asked for permission to send in a Haganah relief force, which was denied on the grounds it might interfere with a cease-fire negotiation. British forces in the area did not intervene initially, the reason, according to Meron Benvenisti, being to "let the Arabs take revenge for Deir Yassin, so as to calm somewhat the rage of the Arab world." Marlin Levin suggests that the Arabs had an understanding whereby their operation would not be blocked if they refrained from firing on British units. One of the first men on the scene was Major Jack Churchill, who arrived on the scene at 11:15 am and banged on a bus, offering to evacuate members of the convoy in an APC. His offer was refused in the belief that the Haganah would come to their aid in an organized rescue. When no relief arrived, Churchill and his twelve men provided what cover fire they could against hundreds of Arabs. The Army unit tried to arrange a cease-fire between "11 and noon". Shortly after 1 pm, two British armoured cars, one occupied by the commander of British forces in Palestine, General Gordon MacMillan, approached the area from the Nablus road, observed the firefight, but refrained from risking British lives by intervening, preferring to let the Jews and Arabs fight it out themselves. As they passed Nashashibi bend, according to one testimony, they blocked the retreat, and Rahav ordered his men to fire at them in order to have them get out of the way. They left the scene at 2 pm, returning at 3 pm with heavier weapons. Negotiations were conducted between one of the leaders of the Arab ambush, Adil Latif, two Haganah men and a British officer, the Arabs proposing that all Jewish arms be surrendered, and all Jewish men capable of combat taken prisoner. The talks were suddenly interrupted when Latif was shot down.

At around 2 pm, the first of the buses was set on fire, and shortly after the second was enveloped in flames, both from Molotov cocktails. Only one man from each bus survived, Shalom Nissan and Nathan Sandowsky, the latter testifying that passing British convoys refused to render help despite their pleas. Arab shouts of "Minshan Deir Yassin" ("For Deir Yassin") could be heard. Dr. Chaim Yassky was mortally wounded by a ricocheting bullet in the white ambulance, which had the thickest armour of all, at around 2.30 pm. The Haganah made one further attempt to mount a rescue by towing out vehicles with an armoured car, but failed. Throughout the day, pleas had been made for British intervention without result. Brigadier Jones eventually received permission at 4 pm, reached the British outpost behind the convoy with three armoured cars, and their fire raked Arab forces, shooting fifteen Arabs, while bazookas were also employed as half-tracks were despatched to collect the survivors. At 5 pm, the Army "laid down smoke", and began retrieving the 28 survivors, by which time one bus was burnt out and a second on fire. Following the massacre, Churchill oversaw the evacuation of 700 patients and staff from the hospital.

Two Irgun militants injured at Deir Yassin were among the patients being transported in the convoy.

== Casualties ==
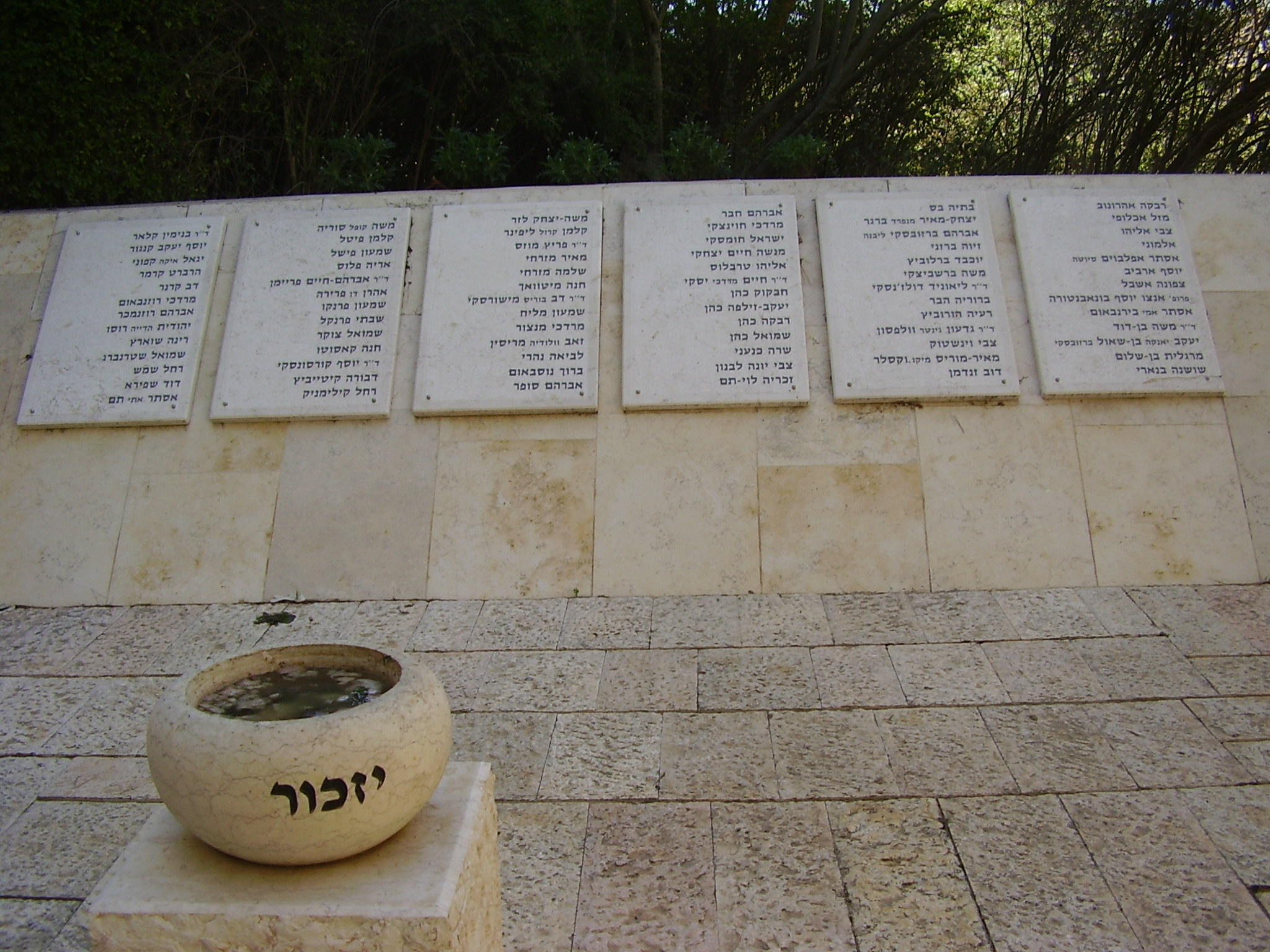
Hadassah convoy memorial at Hadassah University Hospital, Mount Scopus

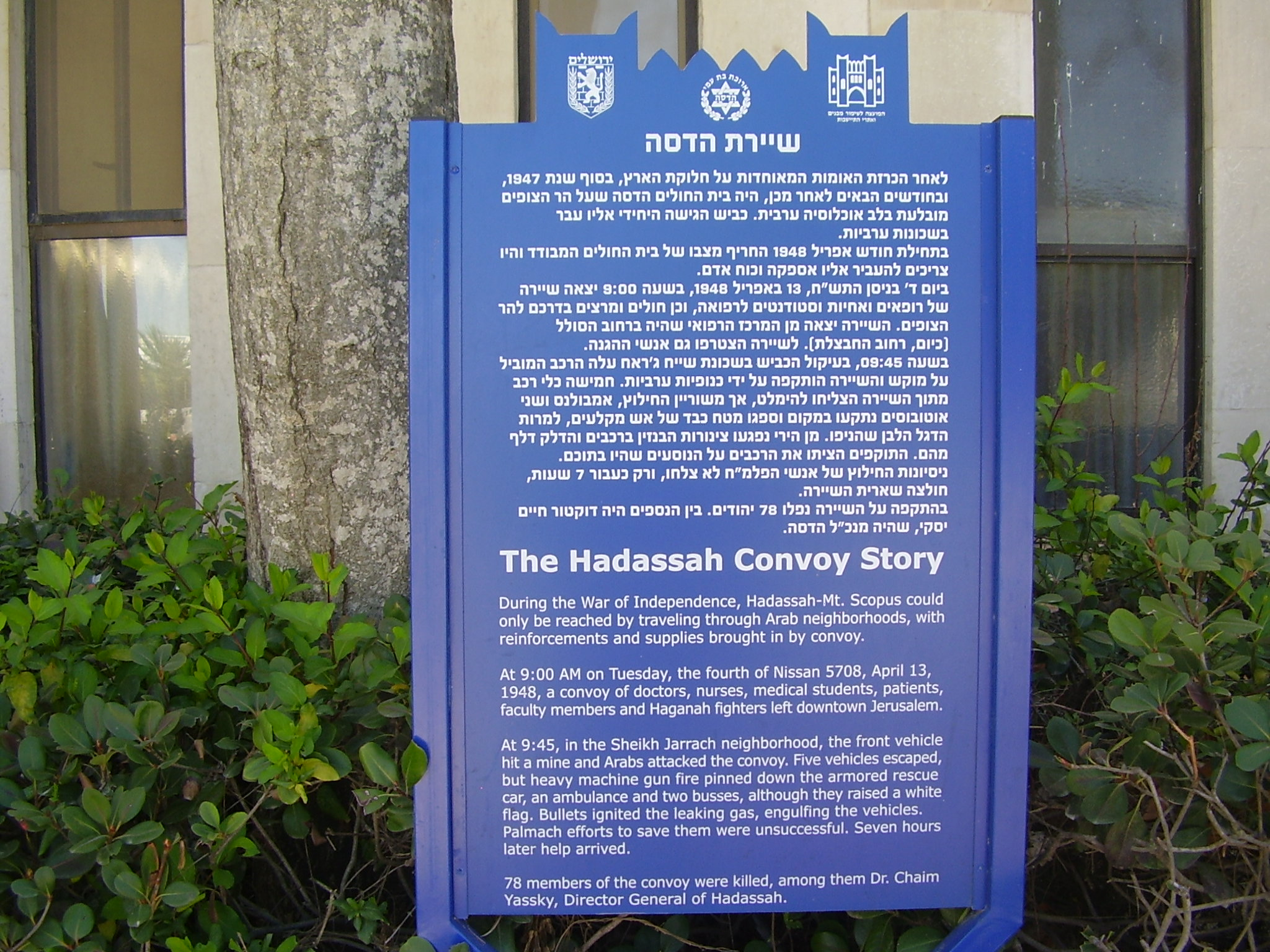
Hadassah convoy story at Hadassah University Hospital, Mount Scopus

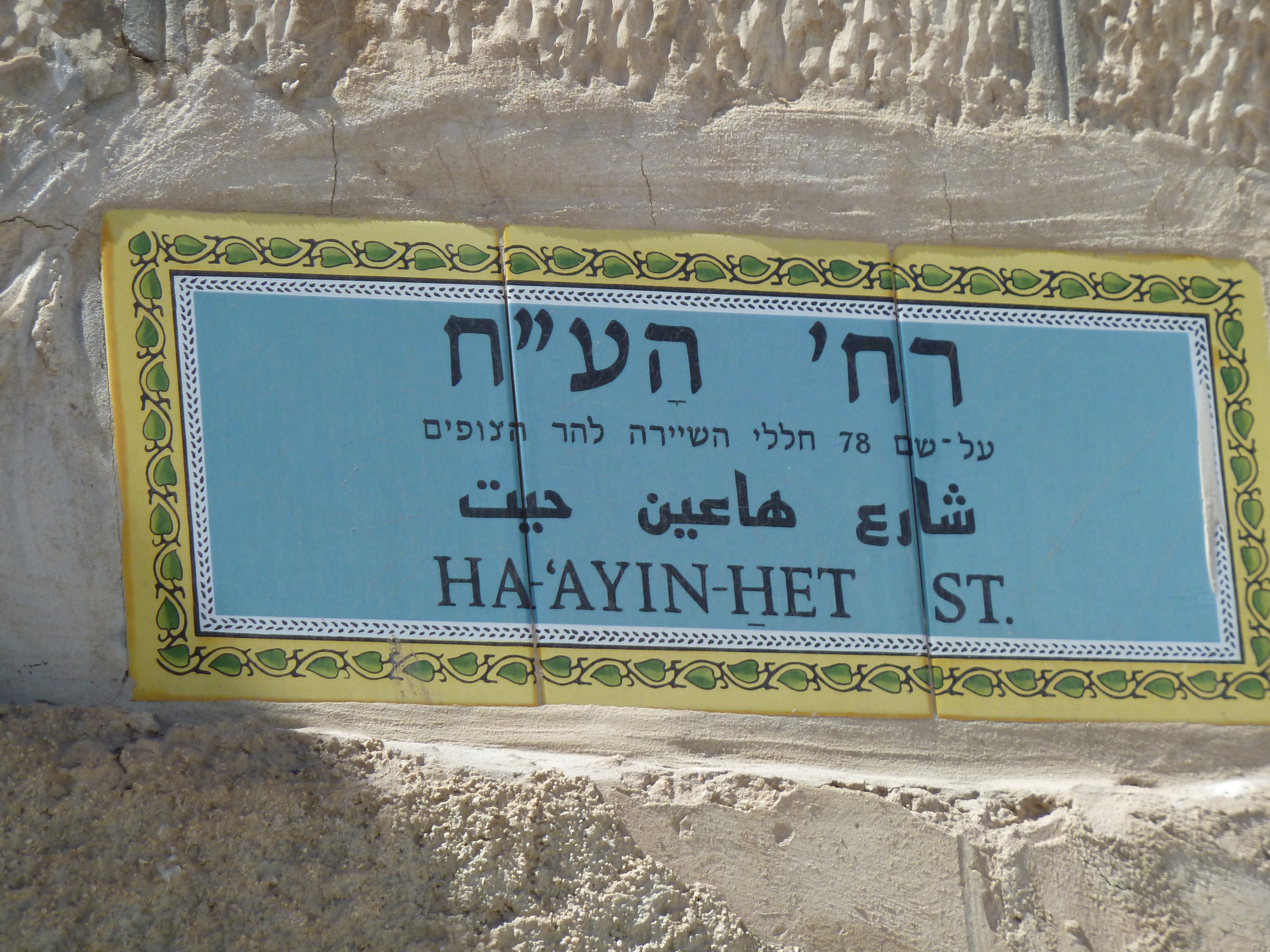
Ha Ayin-Het Street, named for the slain 78 of the convoy to Har HaTzofim

In the attack, 79 Jews and one British soldier were killed by gunfire or were burnt when their vehicles were set on fire. Twenty-three were women. Among the dead were Dr. Chaim Yassky, director of the hospital, and Dr. Moshe Ben-David, slated to head the new medical school (which was eventually established by the Hebrew University in the 1950s).

Most of the bodies were burned beyond recognition. The 31 victims that could be identified were buried individually. The remaining 47 Jews were purportedly buried in a mass grave in the Sanhedria Cemetery. However, in the mid-1970s, Yehoshua Levanon, the son of one of the victims, discovered that a commission of inquiry convened at the time of the attack reported that only 25 were buried in the mass grave and 22 victims were missing. Going in search of the missing bodies, in 1993 he met an Arab who had participated in the ambush, who claimed that the attackers had buried stray body parts in a mass grave near the Lions' Gate. In 1996 Levinson petitioned the Israeli High Court to force the Defense Ministry to set up a genetic database to identify the 25 bodies buried in the Sanhedria cemetery. The mass grave was never opened. One British soldier also died in the attack, making the total of fatalities 79.

== Aftermath ==
The day after the attack, several thousand Orthodox Jews demonstrated in the Jewish Quarter, demanding a "cease fire". In a statement they claimed that the demonstration was broken up by the Haganah.

British soldier Jack Churchill coordinated the evacuation of 700 Jewish doctors, students and patients from the Hadassah hospital on the Hebrew University campus on Mount Scopus in Jerusalem.

== Inquiry ==
On that same day, April 12, the Jewish Agency requested that the Red Cross intervene over what they called a grave Arab violation of the conventions. An inquiry conducted among the Arabs, Jews and the British suggested the circumstances were more complex. The firefight had lasted several hours, indicating that the convoy was armed. The Arabs claimed that they had attacked the military formation by blowing up the armoured cars. They were unable to make a distinction between military and civilians because, they maintained, all the Jews, including the medical personnel, had taken part in the battle. The Jews claimed that they had the right to protect their medical convoys with troops. They admitted in the end, according to Jacques de Reynier, that they had been relieving the unit at the Hadassah hospital and furnishing the troop there with ammunition with the same convoys as those of the Red Shield. That practice was justified, they said, because the role of that troop was exclusively one of defending the hospital.

De Reynier repeated the position of the Red Cross that a mobile medical unit must move around unarmed and always separately from combat units. One had a choice between having recourse to armed protection or the protection of the Geneva Conventions and the Red Cross flag. Both staging troops in a position of strategic importance and refurnishing them with supplies, de Reynier argued, had nothing to do with the hospital's functions. The Jewish Agency had been prepared to have the troop stationed there withdrawn and its protection entrusted to the Red Cross but was overruled by the Haganah, which insisted that convoys to the hospital could not pass unless they went under military escort. De Reynier then volunteered to put this to the test with a practical proof that an unarmed convoy could pass.

The following day, without warning the Arabs, he led a small column of vehicles under a Red Cross flag while the following cars displayed the red shield. Their passage passed without a shot, and de Reynier argued that to be proof that the Arabs respected the Red Cross. The result was that leaders on both sides eventually ordered that military operations were to be separated from activities associated with medical assistance and the Red Cross.

The situation in the compound became grim, and the decision was made to evacuate the hospital in early May, leaving a staff of 200 to run a reduced 50 beds. The hospital was effectively closed by the end of May, as no supplies could reach it, though a small number of doctors and students remained. In July, a deal was worked out where Mount Scopus became a United Nations area, with 84 Jewish policemen assigned to guard the now-shuttered hospital.

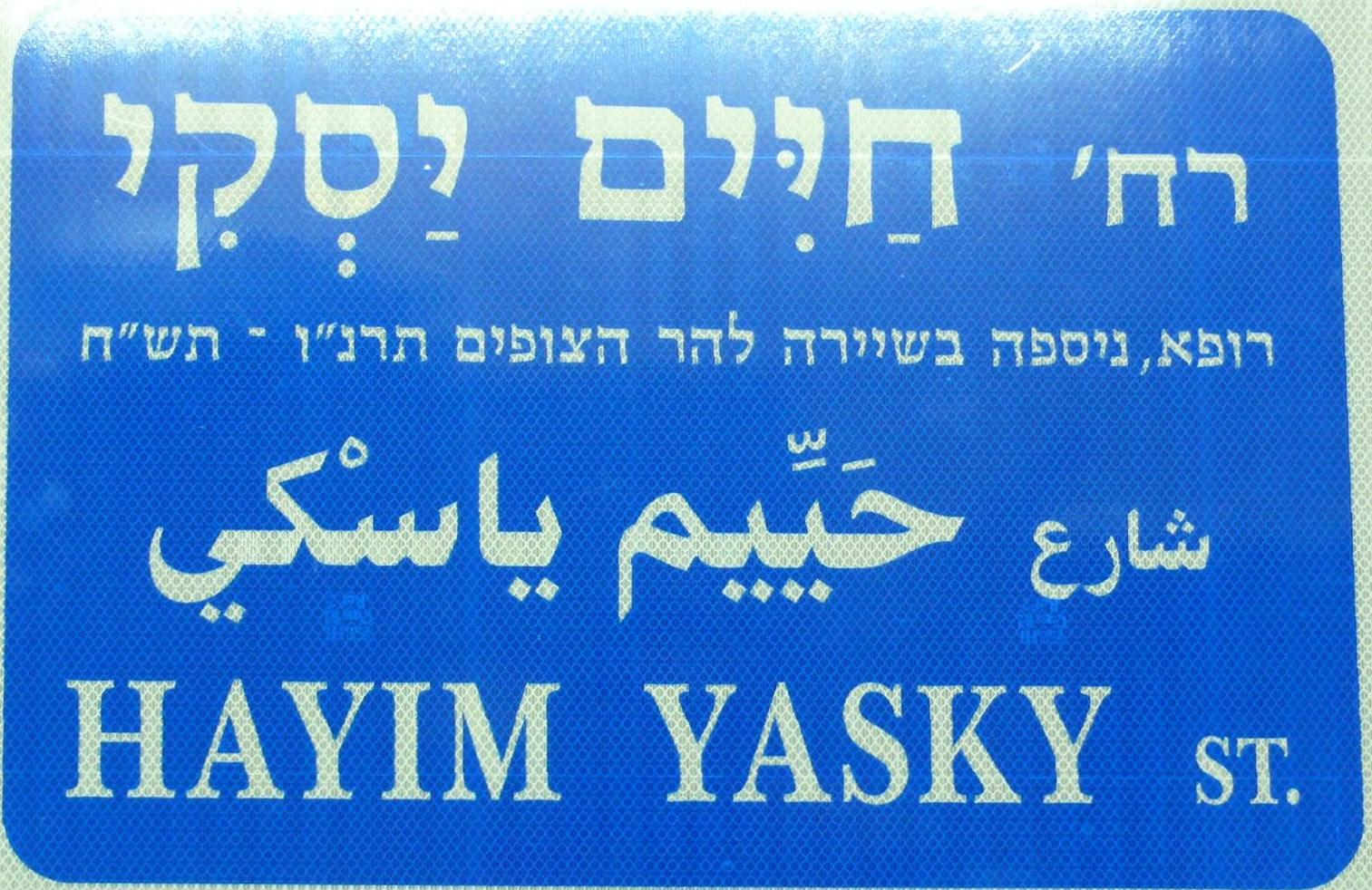
Haim Yassky Street, named for doctor killed in the convoy to Har HaTzofim

In the armistice agreement with Jordan, signed on April 3, 1949, the hospital became a demilitarized Israeli enclave, with a small adjacent no-man's-land (containing a World War I Allied military cemetery under British supervision) and the rest of Mount Scopus and East Jerusalem becoming Jordanian. The Israeli government and Hadassah donors then re-founded the hospital in Israeli West Jerusalem, with the original hospital staff (Hadassah Ein Kerem hospital).

The Mount Scopus hospital resumed medical services only after the Six-Day War.

On the 60th anniversary of the massacre, the city of Jerusalem named a street in honor of Dr. Yassky.

== See also ==
- 1947-1948 Civil War in Mandatory Palestine
- List of massacres in Israel
- Killings and massacres during the 1948 Palestine War
- Convoy of 35
