= Saleh Abd al-Jawad =

Palestinian historian

Saleh Al-Jawad
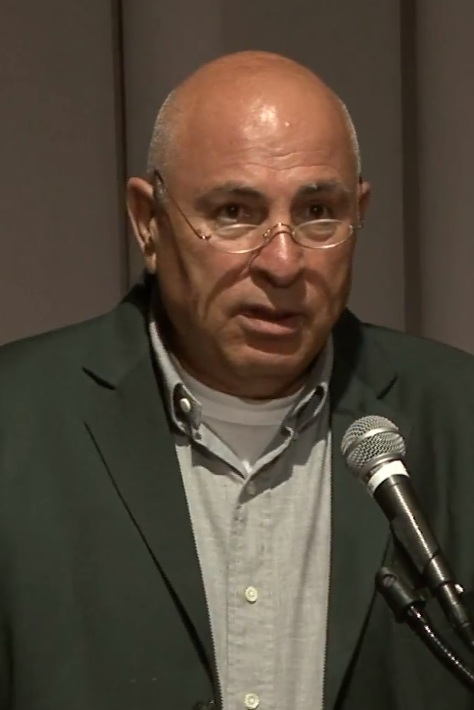
- Al-Jawad in 2012
- Born: 1952 (age 73–74); Al-Bireh, Ramallah and al-Bireh, Palestine
- Education: Paris X-Nanterre University (PhD)

Saleh Abd al-Jawad, also spelled Saleh Abdel Jawad, (Arabic: صالح عبد الجواد, born 1952) is a Palestinian historian. He has worked as Professor of History and Political Science at Birzeit University since 1981.

== Biography ==
Born in Al-Bireh, he received his PhD in political science from Paris X-Nanterre University in 1986.

In January 1987, he was sentenced to 39 days imprisonment by an Israeli military court after participating in a sit-down strike at Birzeit University in December 1986.

== Publications ==
- Abd al-Jawad, S., 2001, The Israeli Assassination Policy in the Aqsa Intifada, JMCC.
- Abd al-Jawad, S., 2003, Le témoignage des Palestiniens entre l’historiographie israélienne et l’historiographie arabe : le cas de 1948 in COQUIO, C. L’histoire trouée. Négation et témoignage, Nantes : l’Atalante, pp. 627–639.
- Abd al-Jawad, S., 2005, Palestinians and the Historiography of the 1948 War, Muwatin.
- Abd al-Jawad, S., 2006 The Arab and Palestinian Narratives of the 1948 War in Rotberg, R.I., The Intertwined Narratives of Israel-Palestine: History's Double Helix, Indianapolis : Indiana University Press, pp. 72–113.
- Abd al-Jawad, S., 2007, Zionist Massacres: the Creation of the Palestinian Refugee Problem in the 1948 War, in Benvenisti, E., Gans, C. and Hanafi, S., Israel and the Palestinian Refugees, Berlin, Heidelberg, New-York : Springer, pp. 59–127.
