= Khirbat al-Wa'ra al-Sawda' =

Khirbet al-Wa'ra al-Sawda' خربة الوعرة السوداء
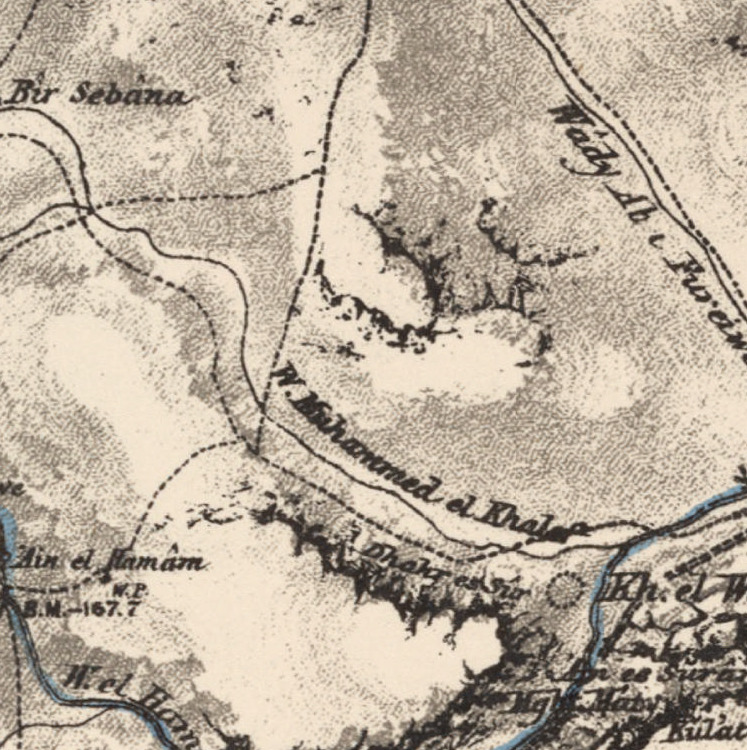
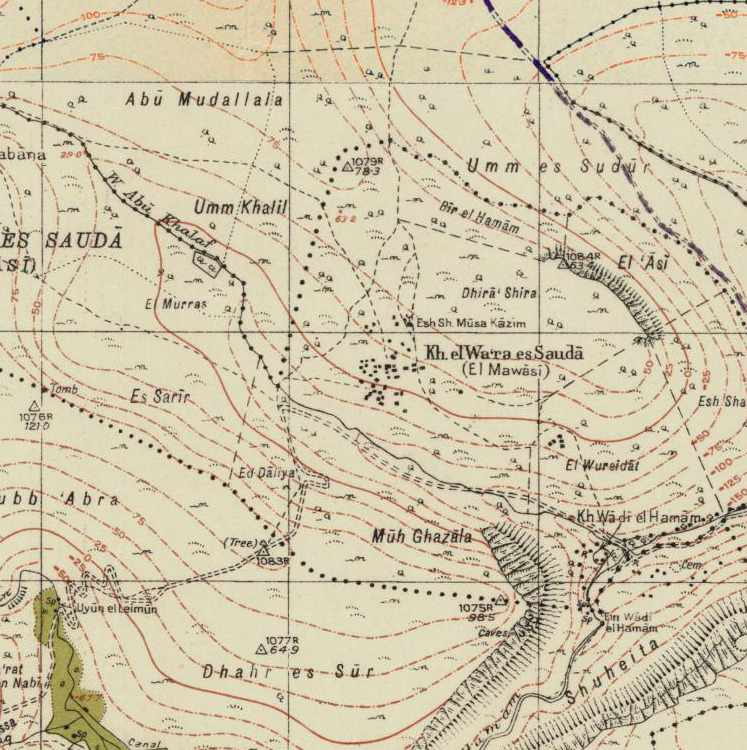
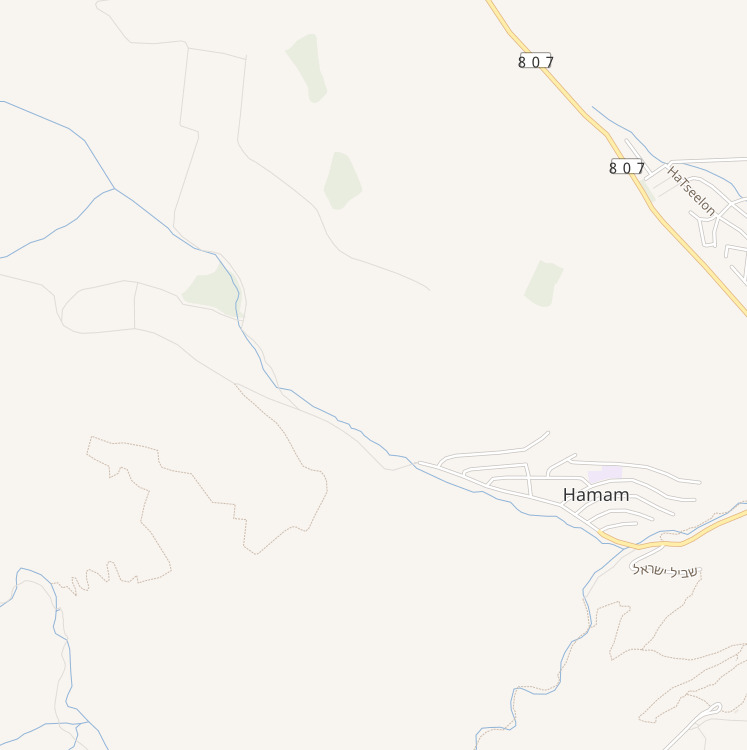
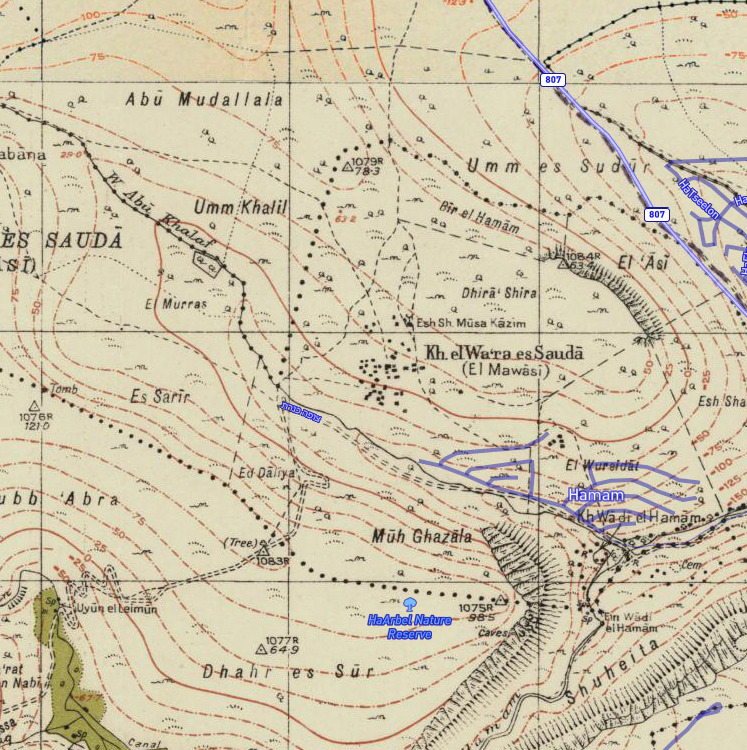
- 1870s map 1940s map modern map 1940s with modern overlay map A series of historical maps of the area around Khirbat al-Wa'ra al-Sawda' (click the buttons)

- Location within Mandatory Palestine
- Coordinates: 32°50′02″N 35°28′51″E
- Palestine grid: 195/248
- Geopolitical entity: Mandatory Palestine
- Subdistrict: Tiberias
- Date of depopulation: 2 November 1948

Area
  - Total: 7,036 dunams (7.036 km^{2}; 2.717 sq mi)

Population (1945)
  - Total: 1,870
- Cause(s) of depopulation: Expulsion by Yishuv forces

Khirbat al-Wa'ra al-Sawda' (Arabic: خربة الوعرة السوداء) was a Palestinian Arab village in the Tiberias Subdistrict. In 1945, the village had a population of 1,870 Arabs. It was depopulated during the 1947–1948 Civil War in Mandatory Palestine on April 18, 1948. It was located 7.5 km northeast of Tiberias. Some of the villagers fled to Syria while others migrated to the central Galilee.

== History ==
Khirbat al-Wa'ra al-Sawda' was classified as a hamlet by the Palestine Index Gazetteer. Situated on a small plateau composed of volcanic stone, it was connected to Hittin by a dirt road and overlooked Wadi Hamam and Lake Tiberias.

=== British Mandate era ===
During the British Mandate period in Palestine, the village's houses—which were constructed from stone—were clustered together in an irregular pattern. Bedouin tents were set up for inhabitants who had not built permanent homes. Most of the residents, all of whom were Muslims, belonged to the 'Arab al-Mawasi tribe, while the remainder were members of the Arab al-Wuhayb tribe.

Shrines were built for two local sheikhs, Umar al-Qadhim and Musa al-Qadhim, at the northern outskirts of Khirbat al-Wa'ra al-Sawda. Religious ceremonies were held by the villagers at the tombs.

The village comprised a total area of 7,036 dunums in the 1945 statistics. Agriculture was the primary economic sector, with olives and grain being the principal crops grown, with a large number of inhabitants were employed in cereal farming, which occupied about 29% of the land area.

Types of landuse in dunums by Arabs in 1945:

Land Usage	Dunums
Cereal	2,027
Urban	10
Cultivable	2,027
Non-cultivable	4,999

The land ownership of the village before occupation in dunums:

Owner	Dunums
Arab	7,036
Jewish	0
Public	0
Total	7,036

=== 1948 war and aftermath ===
According to Palestinian historian Walid Khalidi, no published accounts of Khirbat al-Wa'ra al-Sawda's capture by Israeli forces during the 1948 Arab-Israeli War have been recorded. Khalidi suggests it was possible that the village was occupied in the wake of Tiberias' fall on April 18, 1948, when Haganah forces attacked a few nearby villages afterward. A second possibility was that it was seized in the course of Operation Dekel in mid-July as Israeli forces advanced eastward after capturing Nazareth.

An oral report from the village's residents claims a massacre occurred in late October and early November 1948. The report entailed that Jewish troops rounded up 15 men from Khirbat al-Wa'ra al-Sawda' who were later taken to the nearby Arab village of Eilabun and shot them, killing all but one. He fled to Syria with most of the Arab al-Mawasi. The remaining inhabitants relocated to the central Galilee where they joined other Bedouin tribes.

No Jewish towns were built on village lands, but Arbel was constructed 2 kilometers (1.2 mi) southeast of the village site in 1949, on the land of Hittin, and Ravid was constructed 3 kilometers (1.9 mi) west of the village site. Khalidi states "No traces of the houses remain. Stone terraces provide the only indication of a former village on the site. The site and lands are used largely as grazing areas, although some of the lands are cultivated by Israelis."

== Bibliography ==
- Department of Statistics (1945). Village Statistics, April, 1945. Government of Palestine.
- Hadawi, S. (1970). Village Statistics of 1945: A Classification of Land and Area ownership in Palestine. Palestine Liberation Organization Research Center. Archived from the original on 2018-12-08.
- Khalidi, W. (1992). All That Remains: The Palestinian Villages Occupied and Depopulated by Israel in 1948. Washington D.C.: Institute for Palestine Studies. ISBN 0-88728-224-5.
- Mills, E., ed. (1932). Census of Palestine 1931. Population of Villages, Towns and Administrative Areas. Jerusalem: Government of Palestine.
- Morris, B. (2004). The Birth of the Palestinian Refugee Problem Revisited. Cambridge University Press. ISBN 978-0-521-00967-6.
