= Chaim Yassky =

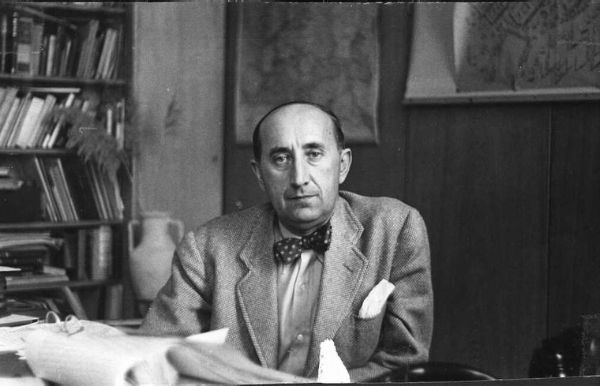
Dr. Chaim Yassky

Chaim Yassky (Hebrew: חיים יסקי; November 23, 1896 – April 13, 1948) was a physician and medical administrator in Jerusalem. He was killed in the Arab attack on a medical convoy bringing supplies to Hadassah Hospital on Mount Scopus.

== Biography ==
Yassky was born in Kishinev in the Russian Empire (present-day Moldova) in 1896. While studying medicine at the University of Odessa, he became active in the Zionist movement. Before World War I he took part in Jewish self-defense against pogromists in Odessa.

In 1917, after the Russian revolution, he co-founded the Russian Maccabee Society, a Zionist youth organization.

After World War I, he worked in a Military Hospital in Odessa, before leaving for the British Mandate of Palestine.

In 1919, Yassky immigrated to Palestine.

In 1921, he received a medical degree from Geneva University in Switzerland, after specializing in ophthalmology and in 1927, was appointed acting head of the eye department of the Rothschild-Hadassah Hospital.

As an ophthalmologist, he initiated programs to eradicate trachoma. In 1931, Yassky became director of the Hadassah Medical Organization. He was one of the driving spirits behind the establishment of the Rothschild-Hadassah University Hospital on Mount Scopus, which was opened in 1939.

At the start of World War II, Hadassah formed an emergency committee to administer a health program and to cooperate with the allied medical corps of which Dr. Yassky was a committee-member. After the cessation of hostilities, he helped to plan the group's health work.

Yassky was killed in the Hadassah medical convoy massacre on April 13, 1948, during the 1948 Arab-Israeli war, approximately one month before Israel's declaration of independence. A bullet went through his liver.
