= Kfar Etzion massacre =

Massacre in the 1947–1949 Palestine war

Coordinates: 31°38′56.4″N 35°6′55.44″E

- Part of 1947–48 Civil War in Mandatory Palestine
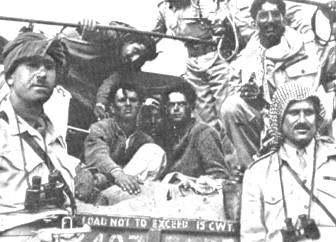
- Arab Legion Major Abdullah el Tell (far right) with Captain Hikmat Mihyar (far left) pose with two of the four Jewish survivors of the Fall of Gush Etzion. Around May 13, 1948.
- Location: Kfar Etzion, Mandatory Palestine
- Date: May 13, 1948; 78 years ago
- Deaths: 127 (15 after surrendering)
- Perpetrator: Arab irregulars
- Defender: Haganah

The Kfar Etzion massacre refers to a massacre of Jews that took place after a two-day battle in which Jewish Kibbutz residents and Haganah militia defended Kfar Etzion from a combined force of the Arab Legion and local Arab men on May 13, 1948, the day before the Israeli Declaration of Independence. Of the 127 Haganah fighters and Jewish kibbutzniks who died during the defence of the settlement, Martin Gilbert states that fifteen were killed on surrendering.

Controversy surrounds the responsibility and role of the Arab Legion in the killing of those who surrendered. The official Israeli version maintains that the kibbutz residents and Haganah soldiers were massacred by local Arabs and the Arab Legion of the Jordanian Army as they were surrendering. The Arab Legion version maintains that the Legion arrived too late to prevent the kibbutz attack by men from nearby Arab villages, which was allegedly motivated by a desire to avenge the massacre of Deir Yassin and the destruction of one of their villages several months earlier. The surrendering Jewish residents and fighters are said to have been assembled in a courtyard, only to be suddenly fired upon; it is said that many died on the spot, while most of those who managed to flee were hunted down and killed.

Four prisoners survived the massacre and were transferred to Transjordan. Immediately following the surrender on May 13, the kibbutz was looted and razed to the ground. The members of the three other kibbutzim of the Gush Etzion -- Massu'ot Yitzhak (established in 1945), Ein Tzurim (1946) and Revadim (1947) -- surrendered the next day and were taken as POWs to Jordan.

The bodies of the victims were left unburied until, one and a half years later, the Jordanian government allowed Shlomo Goren to collect the remains, which were then interred at Mount Herzl. The survivors of the Etzion Bloc were housed in former Arab houses in Jaffa.

== Background ==
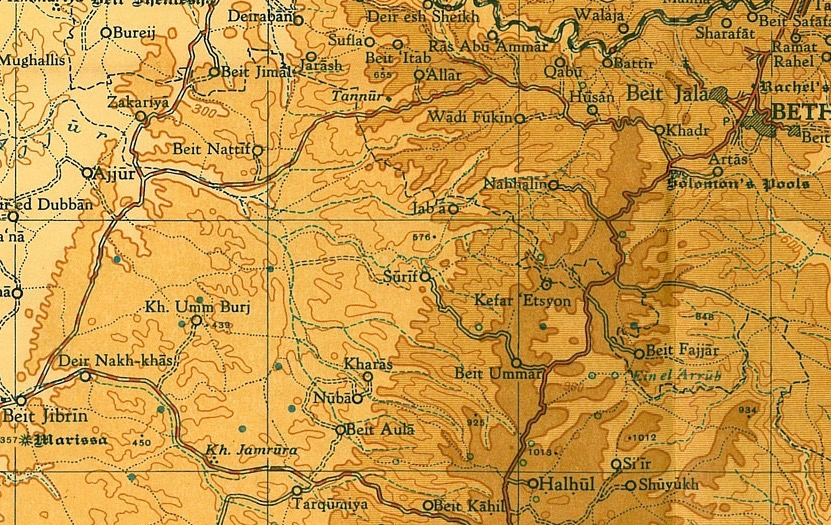
Kfar Etzion 1945 1:250,000

Kfar Etzion was a kibbutz founded in 1943, for military and agricultural ends, about 2 km west of the road between Jerusalem and Hebron. By the end of 1947, there were 163 adults and 50 children living there. Much of the town's population was made up of Holocaust survivors. Together with three nearby kibbutzim established 1945–1947, it formed Gush Etzion ('Etzion Bloc'). According to one member of the settlement, relations were good between settlers and local Arabs, with attendance at each other's weddings, until November 1947.

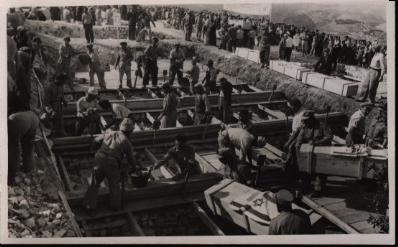
Casualties of the Convoy of 35 being brought to burial in January 1948

The United Nations partition plan for Palestine of November 29, 1947, placed the bloc, an enclave surrounded by an Arab area, inside the boundaries of the intended Arab state, where, moreover, Jewish settlement was to be forbidden through a transitional period. For Hebronite Arabs, the bloc constituted an 'alien intrusion' on ground that had been wholly Arab for centuries,' though it had been built on land either purchased by Jews (1928) or acquired by them through a 1942 acquisition that bypassed Mandatory law. According to Henry Laurens, Kfar Etzion had started hostilities in the area in December by destroying a local Arab village. On 10 December, a convoy from Bethlehem of four trucks en route to the Gush Etzion bloc was ambushed near Solomon's Pools and 10 of its 26 passengers and escorts were killed; The Palestine Police Force had mandated that the convoy travel in pickup tracks, under the belief that armored vehicles would provoke a stronger Arab response, though the ambush of the four trucks indicated that the approach had failed. Though on January 5, the children and some women had been evacuated with British assistance, and though David Shaltiel recommended its evacuation, the Haganah, on Yigal Yadin's counsel, decided against withdrawing from the settlements for several reasons: they commanded a strategic position on Jerusalem's southern approach from Hebron, and were considered, in the words of Abdullah Tall, a 'sharp thorn stuck in the heart of a purely Arab area'. Several relief convoys from the Haganah in Jerusalem had been ambushed.

In the months prior to May 15, Haganah militiamen in the bloc's kibbutzim repeatedly fired on Arab civilians, and British traffic, including convoys, moving between Jerusalem and Hebron, under instruction to do so in order to draw and drain Arab forces from the fight for Jerusalem. On two occasions, April 12 and May 3, Arab Legion units were ambushed, and several legionnaires killed or wounded by the bloc militias, - Kfar Etzion soldiers being directly involved in the incident on April 12 - Arab irregular forces made small-scale attacks against the settlements. An emergency reinforcement convoy attempting to march to Gush Etzion under cover of darkness was discovered and its all 35 members killed by Palestinian Arab forces. Despite some emergency flights by an Auster from Jerusalem and Piper Cubs out of Tel Aviv onto an improvised airfield, adequate supplies were not getting in.

As the end of the British Mandate drew closer, the fighting in the region intensified. Although the Arab Legion was theoretically in Palestine under British command, they began to operate more and more independently. On March 27, land communication with the rest of the Yishuv was severed completely when the Nebi Daniel Convoy was ambushed on its return to Jerusalem, and 15 Haganah soldiers died before the remainder were extricated by the British. It was ambushes by the Etzion Bloc militias conducted against Arab Legion units on April 12 and May 4 that, according to a Haganah analysis, tipped the Legion's policy towards the bloc from one of isolating it to destroying it. On May 4, following the last ambush of a Legion convoy, a joint force of British, Arab Legion and irregular troops launched a major punitive attack on Kfar Etzion. The Haganah abandoned a few outposts but generally resisted, and the attack failed, leaving 12 Haganah soldiers dead, 30 wounded, with a similar number of Arab legionnaires killed, and several dozen wounded. Units from the bloc may have attacked Arab traffic the following day, but the failure of the Legion's assault led Hebronites and Legion units to plan a final attack and destroy the Etzion Bloc militarily. The final assault on Kfar Etzion began on May 12. Parts of two Arab Legion companies, assisted by hundreds of local irregulars, had a dozen armored cars and artillery, to which the Jewish defenders had no effective answer. The commander of Kfar Etzion requested from the Central Command in Jerusalem permission to evacuate the kibbutz, but was ordered to stay. Later in the day, the Arabs captured the Russian Orthodox monastery, which the Haganah used as a perimeter fortress for the Kfar Etzion area, killing twenty-four of its thirty-two defenders.

On May 13, an attack broke through Kfar Etzion's defences and reached the settlement's centre effectively cutting off the perimeter outposts from each other.

== Massacre ==
In the Israeli mainstream version, when the hopelessness of their position became undeniable on May 13, dozens of defenders, the haverim, of Kfar Etzion laid down their arms and assembled in the courtyard, where they suddenly began to be shot at. Those not slain in the first volleys of fire pushed past the Arabs, and either escaped to hide, or gathered their weapons, and were hunted down. The number of people killed and the perpetrators, the Arab legion or local village irregulars or both, are in dispute. According to one account, the main group of about 50 defenders were surrounded by a large number of Arab irregulars, who shouted "Deir Yassin!" and ordered the Jews to sit down, stand up, and sit down again, when suddenly someone opened fire on the Jews with a machine gun and others joined in the killing. Those Jews not immediately cut down tried to run away but were pursued. According to Meron Benvenisti, hand grenades were thrown into a cellar, killing a group of 50 who were hiding there. The building was blown up.

According to other sources, 20 women hiding in a cellar were killed. David Ohana writes that 127 Israeli fighters were killed on the last day.

Arab losses during the two day battle, according to a Haganah estimate, numbered 69: 42 irregulars, and 27 legionnaires. A number of Israeli histories of the Kfar Etzion massacre (such as Levi, 1986, Isseroff, 2005) state that the defenders had put out the white flag and lined up to surrender in front of the school building of the German monastery. An Arab version recounts that a white flag was flown, and drew the Arabs into a trap where they were fired on. Benny Morris cites a Legion officer's statement that the defenders had not formally surrendered, that some resistance continued, with shooting at Arabs, after others had surrendered, that local villagers shot legionnaires trying to defend prisoners, and that legionnaires had to shoot some villagers engaged in the killings. The figure of 127 fatalities among the kibbutzniks and Haganah defenders appears to include 15 who were killed after having surrendered, and the defenders who had been killed in battle over 12–13 May.

In another account, after the 133 defenders had assembled, they were photographed by a man in a kaffiyeh, and then an armored car apparently belonging to the Arab Legion opened fire with its machine gun, and then Arab irregulars joined in. A group of defenders managed to crawl into the cellar of the monastery, where they defended themselves until a large number of grenades were thrown into the cellar. The building was then blown up and collapsed on them.

About 129 persons died in the battle and its aftermath. Only three of the remaining Kfar Etzion residents and one Palmach member survived. According to their own testimony, the circumstances of their survival were as follows.

- Yaacov Edelstein and Yitzhak Ben-Sira tried to hide amongst a jumble of boulders and branches, but they were discovered by a "wrinkled, toothless, old Arab" who told them "Don't be afraid." Then a group of Arab irregulars rushed up and threw them against a wall. The old Arab tried to shield them with his body. As they argued, two Arab Legionnaires came up and took the two Jews under their protection.
- Nahum Ben-Sira, the brother of Yitzhak, was away from the main group when the massacre started. He hid until nightfall then escaped to a nearby kibbutz.
- Alisa Feuchtwanger (Palmach) tried to hide in a ditch with several others. They were discovered and all were killed except Alisa, who was dragged away by several Arab irregulars. As the group were trying to rape her, an Arab Legion officer (Captain Hikmat Mihyar) arrived, shot two of the perpetrators and sent the rest away. Afterwards the officer gave her bread, waited until she finished eating, and said to her (quote) "You are under my protection". She testified that while the officer took her to safety, he shot dead wounded Jews.

Both Alisa and Nahum said that the Legion soldiers actively participated in the massacre.

A total of 157 defenders died in the battle of Gush Etzion (Levi, 1986), including those killed in the massacre at Kfar Etzion. About 2/3 of them were residents and the remainder were Hagana or Palmach soldiers. Israeli historical geographer Yossi Katz put the death toll at 220. Most of the kibbutz's male residents were killed.

On the following day, the Arab irregular forces continued their assault on the remaining three Etzion settlements. Fearing that the defenders might suffer the same fate as those of Kfar Etzion, Zionist leaders in Jerusalem negotiated a deal under the auspices of the Red Cross and British officials for the surrender of the settlements, under the condition that the Arab Legion would protect the residents. The Red Cross took the wounded to Jerusalem, and the Arab Legion took the remainder as prisoners of war. The homes and properties in all four of the kibbutzes were plundered and burned. In the aftermath of the destruction, a 700-year-old tree known as the "lone oak" that had been located among the four kibbutzes was one of the few items left standing. In March 1949, 320 prisoners from the Etzion settlements were released from the "Jordan POW camp at Mafrak", including 85 women.

== Aftermath ==
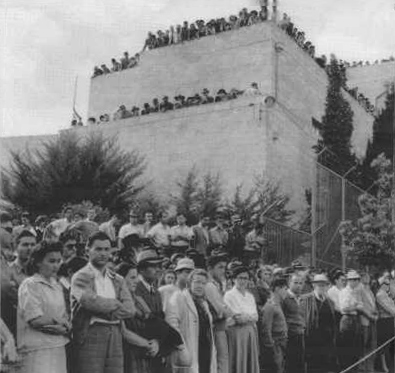
Funeral procession leaving from Jewish Agency building, Jerusalem

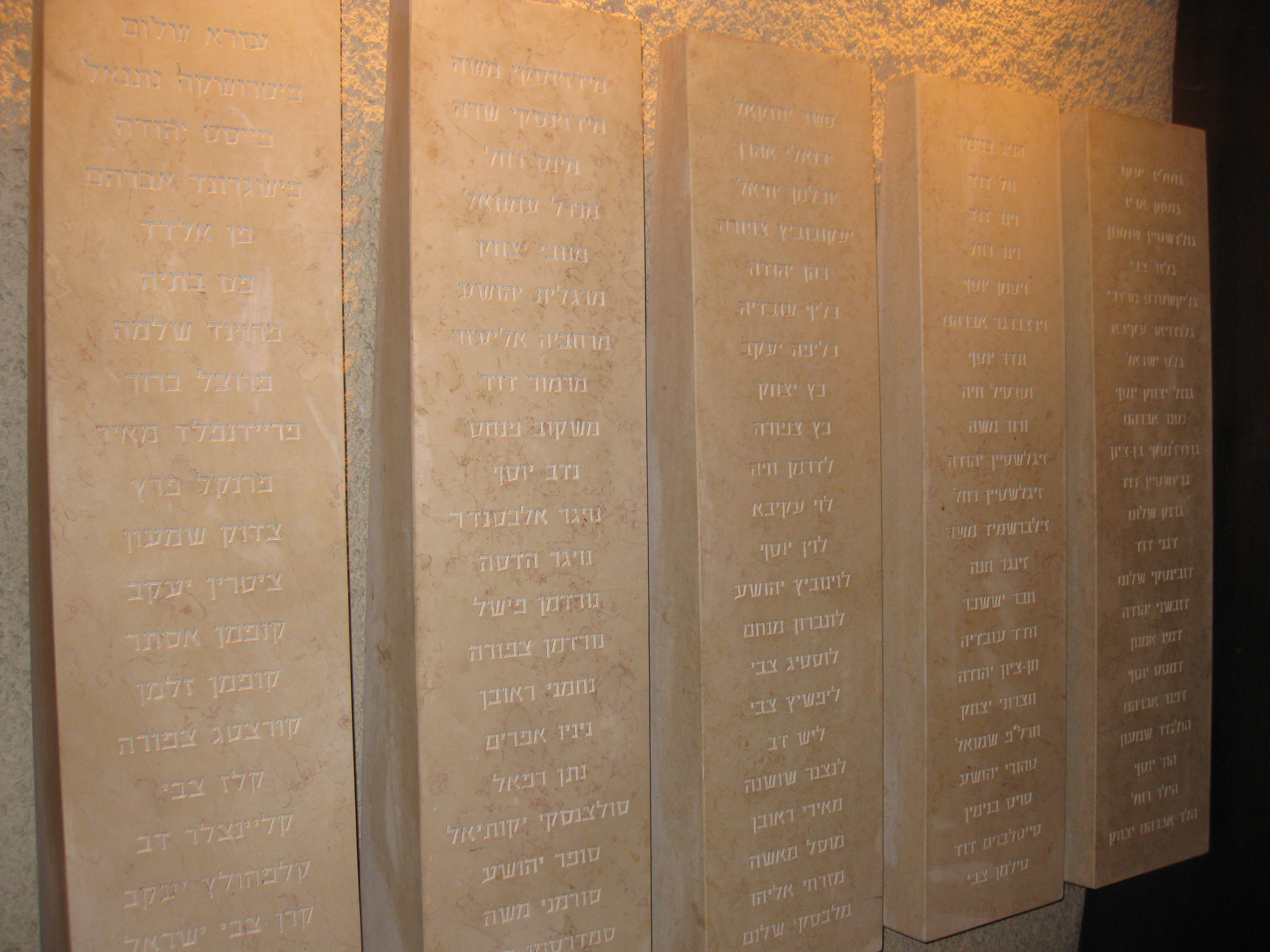
Names of fallen in Kfar Etzion Memorial

On October 28, 1948, the Arab village al-Dawayima was conquered by the IDF 89th Commando Battalion. They then committed the Al-Dawayima massacre, as the villagers were blamed for the Kfar Etzion massacre. Estimates of the number of killed Arab villagers range from 80–100 to 100–200, depending on the source.

The bodies of those killed in the massacre of Kfar Etzion were left at the site for a year and a half, until November 1949, when the Chief Military Rabbi, Shlomo Goren was allowed to collect their bones. They were buried in a full military funeral on November 17 in Mount Herzl in Jerusalem, with about half of the population of Jerusalem attended. Their communal grave was the first grave in what is today the military cemetery of Mount Herzl.

The Etzion Bloc became a symbol of Zionist heroism and martyrdom among Israelis immediately after its fall, and this importance continues. The date of the massacre was enshrined into law as Yom HaZikaron, Israel's Day of Remembrance in 1951, with the formal decision that the observance would always take place back-to-back the day before Independence Day made in 1963. “The disaster in Gush Etzion took place during Israel's War of Independence one day before the state was founded,” Naor said, referring to what is more widely known as the Kfar Etzion massacre on May 13, 1948. In this attack, about 129 Jewish people – the exact numbers is disputed – were killed by Arab and Jordanian forces at Kibbutz Kfar Etzion, which is located in the Judean Hills beyond the Green Line that demarcates Israel’s pre-1967 borders.... While Israel's Independence Day celebrations were enshrined into law as a state holiday in 1949, Yom Hazikaron was only enacted into law many years later. 'Up until 1963, marking Memorial Day just before Independence Day was a custom and not a law,' Naor explained.

The site of the Etzion Bloc was recaptured by Israel during the 1967 war. The children who had been evacuated from the Bloc in 1948 led a public campaign for the Bloc to be resettled, and Prime Minister Levi Eshkol gave his approval. Kfar Etzion was re-established as a kibbutz in September 1967, as the first Israeli settlement in the West Bank after the war.

== See also ==
- Convoy of 35
- Killings and massacres during the 1948 Palestine War
- List of massacres in Israel
- Battle of the Alamo
