= Semiramis Hotel bombing =

1948 Jewish terror attack in Jerusalem

Coordinates: 31.7625°N 35.2081°E

- Part of the 1947–48 Civil War in Mandatory Palestine
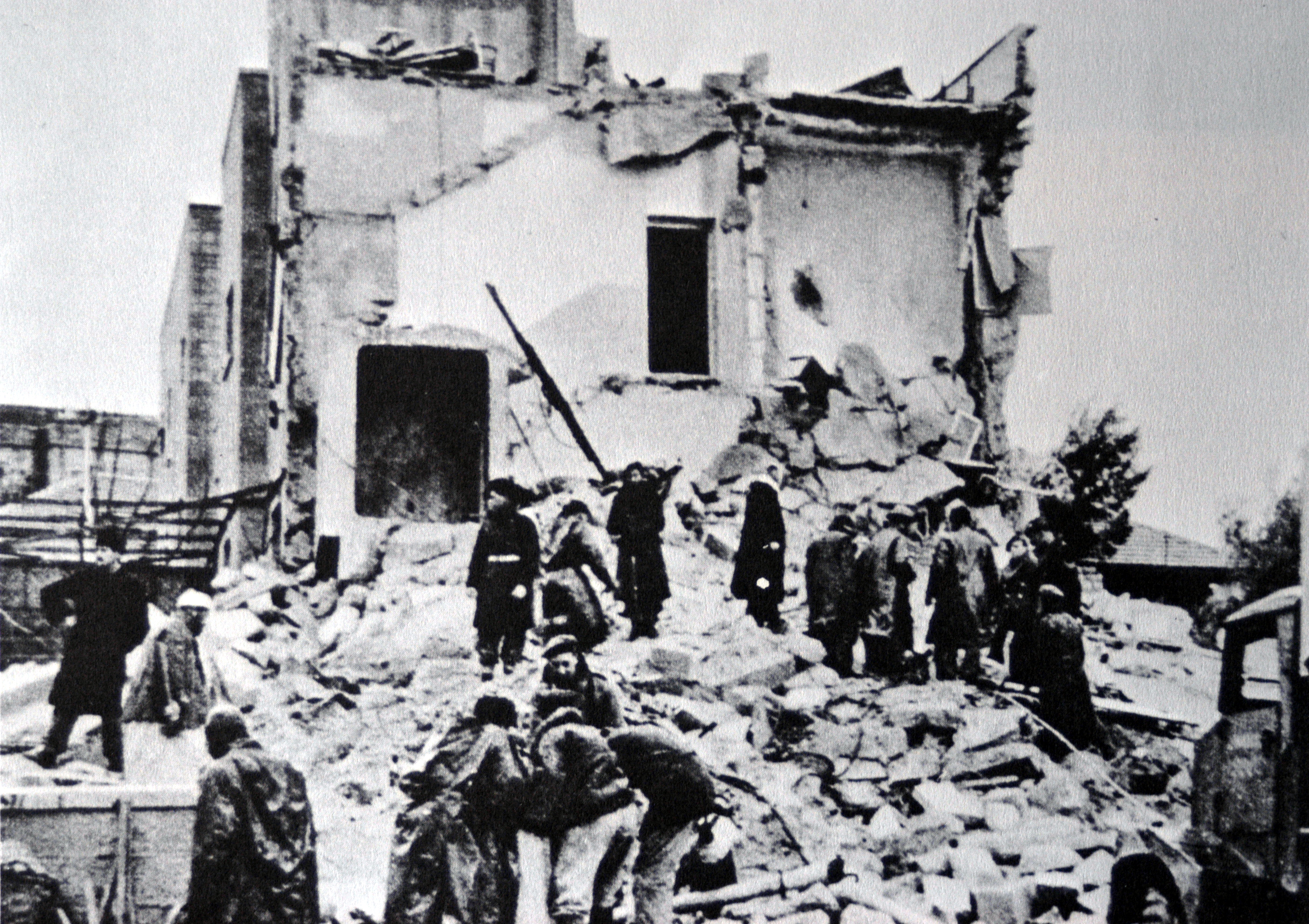
- The ruins of the Semiramis Hotel after the Haganah bombing.
- Location: Jerusalem, Mandatory Palestine
- Date: January 5, 1948; 78 years ago
- Deaths: 24-26
- Perpetrator: Haganah

An attack was carried out by the Jewish paramilitary group Haganah on the Christian-owned Semiramis Hotel in the Katamon neighborhood of Jerusalem during the 1947–1948 Civil War in Mandatory Palestine.

After suspecting that the Semiramis hotel was one of two Arab headquarters in Katamon, the Haganah planted a bomb there on the night of 5–6 January 1948. The mission was carried out by a team consisting of four men supported by ten riflemen. The explosion killed 24 or 26 civilians including at least one child. Among the dead were seven members of the Aboussouan family and Hubert Lorenzo, the 23-year-old son of the proprietor. The Spanish vice-consul, Manuel Allende Salazar, was also killed in the attack.

According to Associated Press reported at the time that a Haganah spokesman said the Jerusalem hotel was attacked because "the building was an important meeting place of Arab gangs, where arms were distributed to villages in the Jerusalem area." He continued, "Unfortunately, we cannot hit at the Arab band's (main) headquarters as it is secreted in a mosque."

The attack was harshly condemned by the British authorities, and David Ben-Gurion sacked Mishael Shaham, the Haganah officer responsible for the Jerusalem sector, replacing him with David Shaltiel. The British authorities denounced the attack as the "wholesale murder of innocent people." According to John B. Quigley, the Jewish Agency complained that the British government had not criticized deadly attacks by Arabs. British government officials responded by stating that Arabs had not carried out organized attacks on buildings containing women and children. Haganah said that they had inaccurate information that the hotel was being used by Arab irregulars. Prior to the bombing, the distinctive white jeep of Abd al-Qadir al-Husayni, commander of Jerusalem's Arab forces, had been seen in the hotel driveway.

In O Jerusalem!, Dominique Lapierre and Larry Collins write that Mishael Shaham, the Haganah leader who organised the bombing, had been sent to Jerusalem to stop the flow of beleaguered Jews retreating from mixed areas of Jerusalem to the Jewish areas. It was thought that 'a major blow in Arab Katamon ... might force the Arabs out of the quarter and change the psychological climate in the city'. Shaham asked "Where is the main Arab headquarters?"

== Bibliography ==
- Gelber, Yoav (2006), Palestine 1948: War, Escape and the Emergence of the Palestinian Refugee Problem, Sussex Academic Press, ISBN 978-1-84519-075-0
- Morris, Benny (2008), 1948: A History of the First Arab-Israeli War, Yale University Press
- Pappé, Ilan (2006), The Ethnic Cleansing of Palestine, One World Publications Ltd
- Quigley, John B. (2005), The Case for Palestine: An International Law Perspective, Duke University Press, ISBN 978-0-8223-3539-9
- Lapierre, Dominique; Collins, Larry (1972), O Jerusalem
