= Abu Shusha massacre =

1948 mass murder by the Givati Brigade

- Part of the 1948 Palestine war and the 1948 Palestinian expulsion
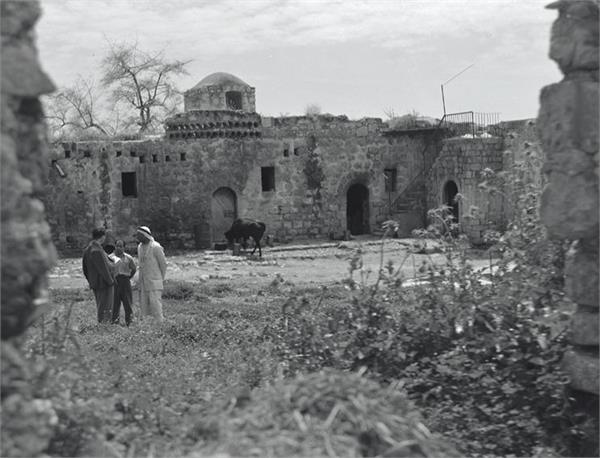
- Abu Shusha in 1945
- Location: Abu Shusha, Mandatory Palestine
- Date: 13–14 May 1948
- Target: Palestinian Arabs
- Deaths: 60–70+ killed
- Perpetrator: Givati Brigade

The Abu Shusha massacre took place on 13–14 May 1948 during Operation Barak, when the Zionist Givati Brigade mortared and then stormed Abu Shusha, in Mandatory Palestine, killing between 60 and 70+ Palestinian Arab villagers.

== Massacre ==
On 13 May, the Givati Brigade launched the second stage of Operation Barak, codenamed "Operation Maccabi". During this, the village of Abu Shusha, located 8 km southeast of Ramle, was targeted. On 13–14 May, Abu Shusha was mortared and then stormed by units of the 51st and 54th battalions. Inhabitants fled and houses were blown up, although some remained. The remaining villagers were expelled on 21 May. A nearby Arab Legion unit reported that "the Jews were killing villagers" on 19 May. The Givati Brigade claimed that only 30 Arabs had been killed, while the Arabs claimed that more than 70 had been killed.

Arab authorities in Ramle called for Red Cross intervention and informed it that "the Jews had committed barbaric acts" in Abu Shusha. A Haganah soldier made two attempts to rape a 20-year old female prisoner.

== Aftermath ==
Recent research suggests that around 60 villagers were massacred during the attack. In 1995, a mass grave with 52 skeletons was discovered in Abu Shusha, although their cause of death is undetermined.

== See also ==
- List of towns and villages depopulated during the 1947–1949 Palestine war
- Zionist political violence
