= Cairo–Haifa train bombings 1948 =

1948 Lehi attacks on Cairo-Haifa train

Cairo-Haifa train bombings
- Part of 1948 Palestine war
- Location: Mandatory Palestine
- Date: 29 February 1948; 78 years ago and 31 March 1948; 78 years ago
- Target: Cairo-Haifa train
- Attack type: Bombings
- Deaths: 68 (40 civilians, 28 soldiers)
- Injuries: 95 (60 civilians, 35 soldiers)
- Perpetrator: Lehi

During the 1948 Palestine war, on February 29 and again on March 31, the military coaches of the Cairo-Haifa train were mined by the Zionist militant group Lehi.

On February 29, Lehi mined the train north of Rehovot, killing 28 British soldiers and wounding 35. No civilians were hurt. One or more bombs laid on the track were detonated from a nearby orange grove. Lehi took credit for the bombing of the British train claiming it was revenge for the Ben Yehuda Street Bombing in Jerusalem. The train was the normal daily passenger express to which four military coaches had been attached.

On March 31, Lehi again mined the train, this time near Binyamina, a Jewish town near Caesarea, killing 40 Arab civilians, and wounding 60. (Note: Nur Masalha, 1992, Expulsion of the Palestinians: The Concept of "Transfer" in Zionist Political Thought, 1882-1948. "The Stern Gang's blowing up of the Cairo-Haifa passenger train (forty Arab civilians killed, sixty injured) in March 1948") Although there were some soldiers on the train, none were injured.

== Background ==
The attacks on the train line had begun in 1947. On April 22, 1947, the train was mined outside Rehovot, the bombing killed five British officers, two Arab adults and a 3-year old, Gilbert Balladi.

On May 15, 1947, the train track was bombed seven times south of Lydda. Two British army lieutenants were killed, two others seriously wounded and five other hurt in one bombing between Acre and Haifa. One commuter was injured when the engine and two cars were derailed by another bomb earlier in the day. Three crew-men were injured when their freight train was derailed in another bombing. Three railroad bridges were damaged in the attacks. Lehi reportedly called in warnings.

On August 9, 1947, Irgun bombed a British troop train north of Lydda, killing the Jewish engineer.

On September 29, 1947, the train was bombed by Irgun twenty miles south of Haifa. The engine, coal car and two cabin cars were derailed, one person was hospitalized.
