= Convoy of 35 =

Group of Haganah fighters killed in the 1947–1948 civil war in Mandatory Palestine

Coordinates: 31.6803°N 35.0561°E

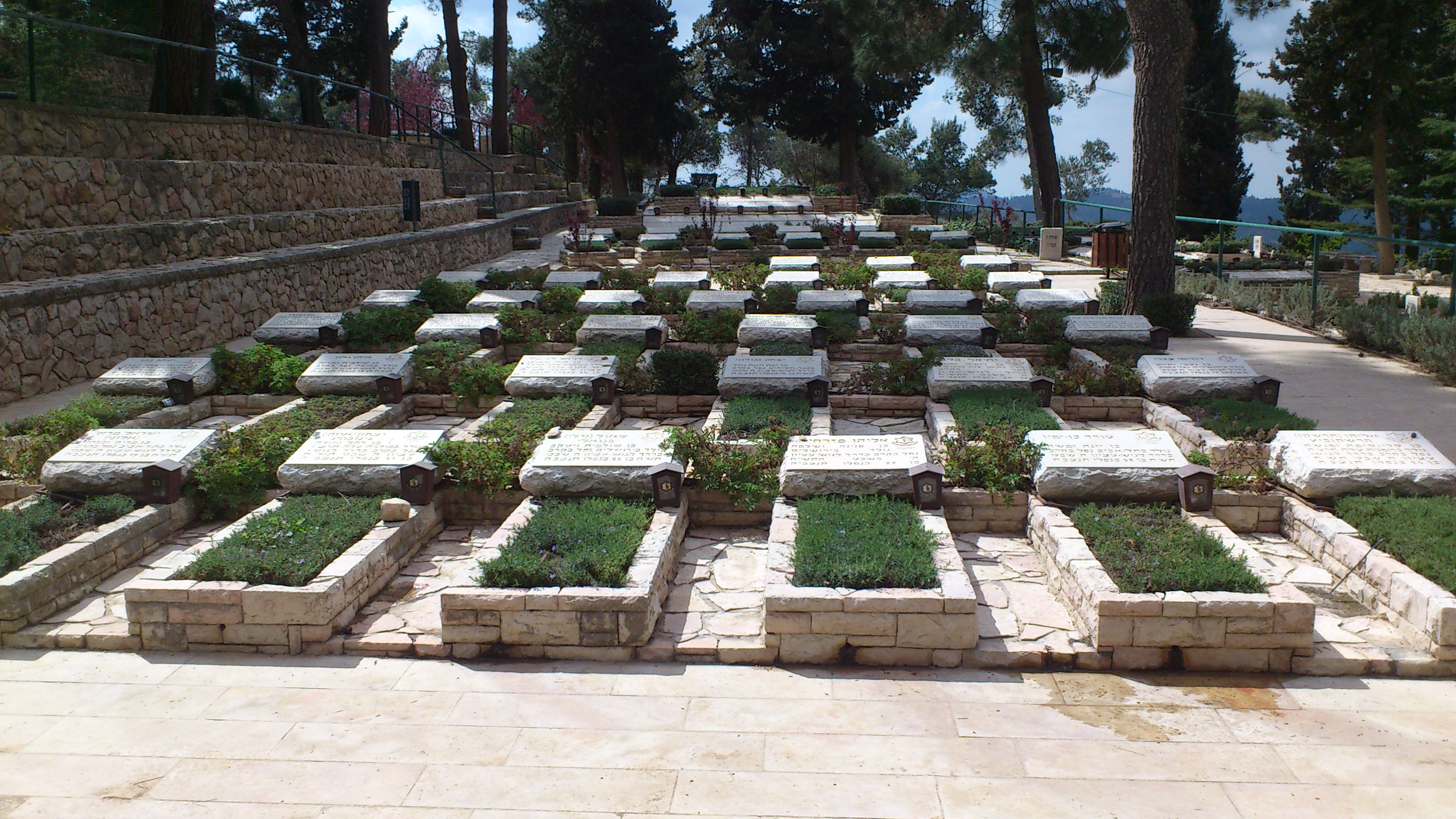
Graves of the Convoy of 35 in Mount Herzl.

The Convoy of 35 (or the Lamed He, which stands for "thirty five" in Hebrew numerals), was a convoy of Haganah and Palmach fighters sent during the 1947–48 Civil War in Mandatory Palestine on a mission to reach by foot and resupply the blockaded kibbutzim of Gush Etzion in January 1948, after earlier motorized convoys had been attacked. They were spotted before they could reach their destination and killed in a prolonged battle by Arab irregulars and local villagers.

== History ==
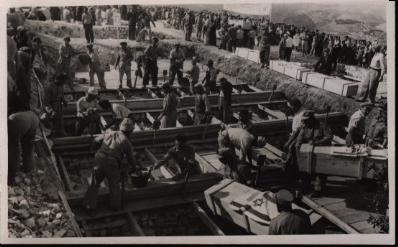
January 1948 casualties of the "Convoy of 35" being brought to burial

On 16 January 1948, a convoy of 38 men was sent by the Haganah to deliver supplies to the four blockaded kibbutzim of Gush Etzion, south of Jerusalem, following an Arab attack on January 14. The unit, named in Hebrew "Machleket HaHar" (lit. Mountain Platoon), set out on foot from Hartuv at 11 p.m. on January 15, commanded by Daniel (Dani) Mass. They took a detour around the Tegart fort-type Palestine Police station, to avoid detection by the British. Three were sent back because one man sprained an ankle, and two accompanied him. The remaining 35 were killed by Arab villagers and militiamen between the villages of Jaba' and Surif.

The fate of the 35 was reconstructed from British and Arab reports. The six hours of night that remained did not suffice for the trip. About an hour before the convoy reached their destination, it became light. Their presence was discovered by two Arab women who encountered two scouts of the group near Surif. (An earlier version, that the soldiers were discovered by an Arab shepherd whom they graciously let go, was based on a eulogy written by Ben-Gurion and is apparently apocryphal.) A large number of armed villagers from Surif and other communities gathered to block the way. The battle was fought in two stages, four hours apart, with hundreds of Arabs from a nearby training base taking part. The Haganah force battled until it ran out of ammunition. The last of the 35 was apparently killed at about 4:30 p.m. Among the dead were Tuvia Kushnir, one of the country's most promising botanists, Moshe Perlstein, an American-born World War II veteran who had made aliyah in 1947, and three members of the Hebrew Communist Party.

A phone conversation about the battle was intercepted by the Irgun, in which it was heard that many were killed and some were wounded. After no word of the 35 had been received for a long time and wounded Arabs started arriving at Hebron, the British dispatched a platoon of the Royal Sussex Regiment to investigate. After threatening and exhorting the village mukhtars and notables, the British were led to the site of the battle where they found the bodies of the 35. According to some reports the bodies had been mutilated beyond recognition.

According to one account the last three Jews to die blew themselves up with a grenade. This account also reports that several Arab sources claimed a young woman was amongst those killed, and that to restore public confidence in the Jewish fighting forces the Palmach launched an attack on the village of Sa'sa' on 14 February in which 60 villagers were killed. A contemporary report puts the number of casualties in Sa'sa at 11 killed and 3 wounded, but official sources confirm the figure of 60 killed with 20 houses destroyed.

== Burial ==
After the 1948 Arab-Israeli War, when the bodies of the 35 were returned to Israel, only 23 of the 35 bodies could be identified. To solve the problem, Rabbi Aryeh Levin performed the rare goral ha-gra (ha-gra = Vilna Gaon) ceremony, a process in which the reader of the Torah is led to certain verses which give hints as to the subjects in question. They were buried in Mount Herzl in Jerusalem.

=== Names of the dead ===
- Daniel (Dani) Mass
- Yisrael Aloni
- Chaim Engel
- Binyamin Bugoslavsky
- Yehuda Bitensky
- Oded Ben-Yamin
- Benzion Ben-Meir
- Yaakov Ben-Attar
- Yosef Baruch
- Eitan Gaon
- Sabo Goland
- Yitzhak Ginzburg
- Yitzhak Halevi
- Eliyahu Hershkovitz
- David Tash
- Alexander Yehuda Cohen
- Yaakov Cohen
- Yehiel Kelev
- Yaakov Caspi
- Yitzhak Zvuloni
- Alexander Avraham Lustig
- Yonah Levin
- Eliyahu Mizrahi
- Amnon Michaeli
- Shaul Pinueli
- Moshe Avigdor Perlstein
- Binyamin Parsitz
- Baruch Pat
- David Sabarna
- Yaakov Shmueli
- David Zwebner
- Yaakov Kotick
- Yosef Kofler
- Tuvia Kushnir
- Daniel Reich

== Commemoration ==
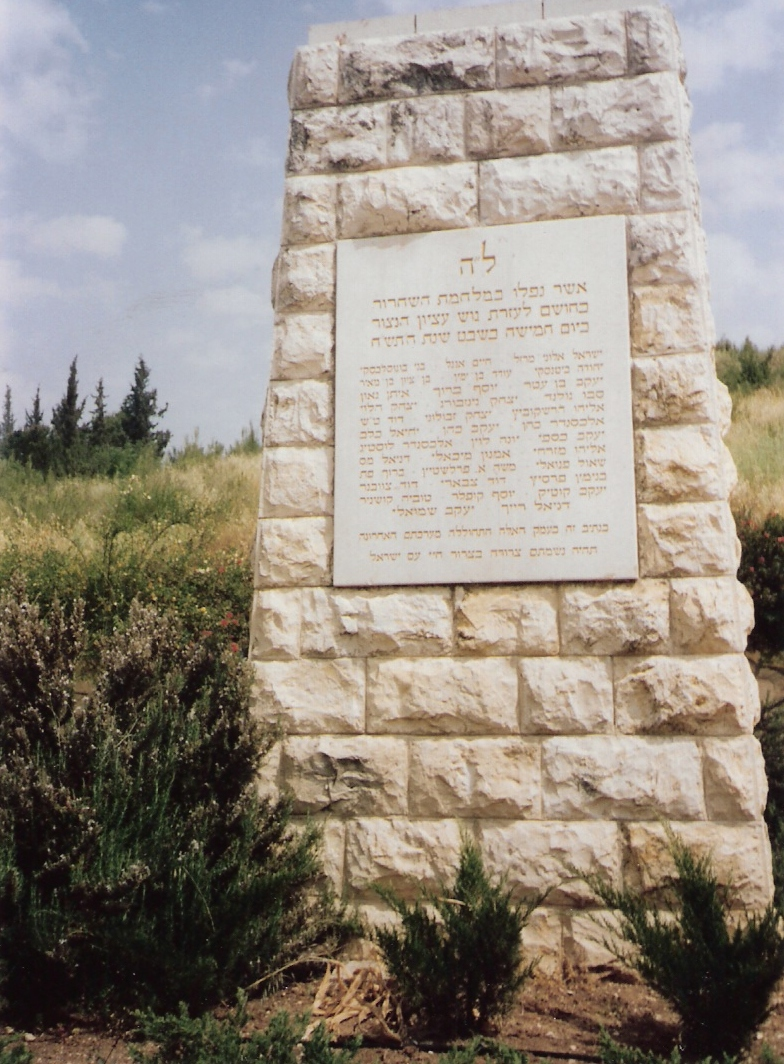
A monument commemorating the 35 fallen fighters

In August 1949, a group of former Palmach soldiers founded a kibbutz, Netiv HaLamed He (Hebrew: נתיב הל"ה, path of the 35) near the convoy's route. They built a memorial commemorating the fallen Haganah soldiers there (see picture). Prior to the 1967 Six-Day War, it was assumed that the precise location of the final battle was on the Jordanian side of the armistice line. However, in 1967 the British police officer who had found the bodies in 1948 and Arab witnesses independently identified a hilltop on the Israeli side of the line.

The story of the 35 was immortalised in a poem, Here Our Bodies Lie by Haim Gouri.

Yael Zerubavel analysed remembrance of the event using the number 35 as a prominent example of the Israeli practice of "numerical commemoration".

== See also ==
- Kfar Etzion massacre
- Gush Etzion Convoy
