= Milstein =

Milstein (Yiddish: מילשטײַן, Hebrew: מילשטיין) is a Jewish surname of Yiddish origin, either a metonymic occupational name for a miller, or an ornamental name meaning "millstone". Notable people with the surname include:

- Adam Milstein (born 1952), Israeli-American investor and philanthropist
- Benjamin Milstein (1918–2013), British heart surgeon
- Beth Milstein, American screenwriter and producer
- César Milstein (1927–2002), Argentine biochemist
- Cindy Milstein, American anarchist activist
- Constance J. Milstein (born 1946), American attorney and diplomat
- Daniel Milstein (born 1975), American entrepreneur
- David Milstein (born 1947), Israeli chemist
- Grigori Milstein (1937–2023), Russian mathematician
- Howard Milstein (born 1951), American banker and businessman
- Milton Milstein (1910–1993), American architect
- Nathalia Milstein (born 1995), French classical pianist
- Nathan Milstein (1904–1992), American violinist
- Ohad Milstein (born 1973), Israeli documentary filmmaker
- Paul Milstein (1922–2010), American real estate developer and philanthropist
- Philip L. Milstein (born 1949), American real estate developer
- Seymour Milstein (1920–2001), American real estate developer and philanthropist
- Silvina Milstein (born 1956), Argentine composer and music scholar
- Uri Milstein (born 1940), Israeli military historian

== See also ==
- Millstein, spelling variant
