= Millstein =

Millstein is a surname that may either be a variant of Milstein, an occupational Ashkenazi surname for a miller, or an Americanized spelling of German Mühlstein, which may either be a nickname for a heavy person or a toponymic surname from the historic village of Mühlstein in Baden-Württemberg, derived from the Middle High German word for millstone. Notable people with the surname include:

- Ira Millstein (1926–2024), American antitrust lawyer, author, and professor
- Roberta Millstein (fl. 1988–present), American philosopher and professor
- Todd Millstein (fl. 1996–present), American computer scientist and professor
