= Deir Yassin massacre =

1948 mass killing by Zionist militants

- Part of the Nakba, the 1947–48 Civil War in Mandatory Palestine and Plan Dalet
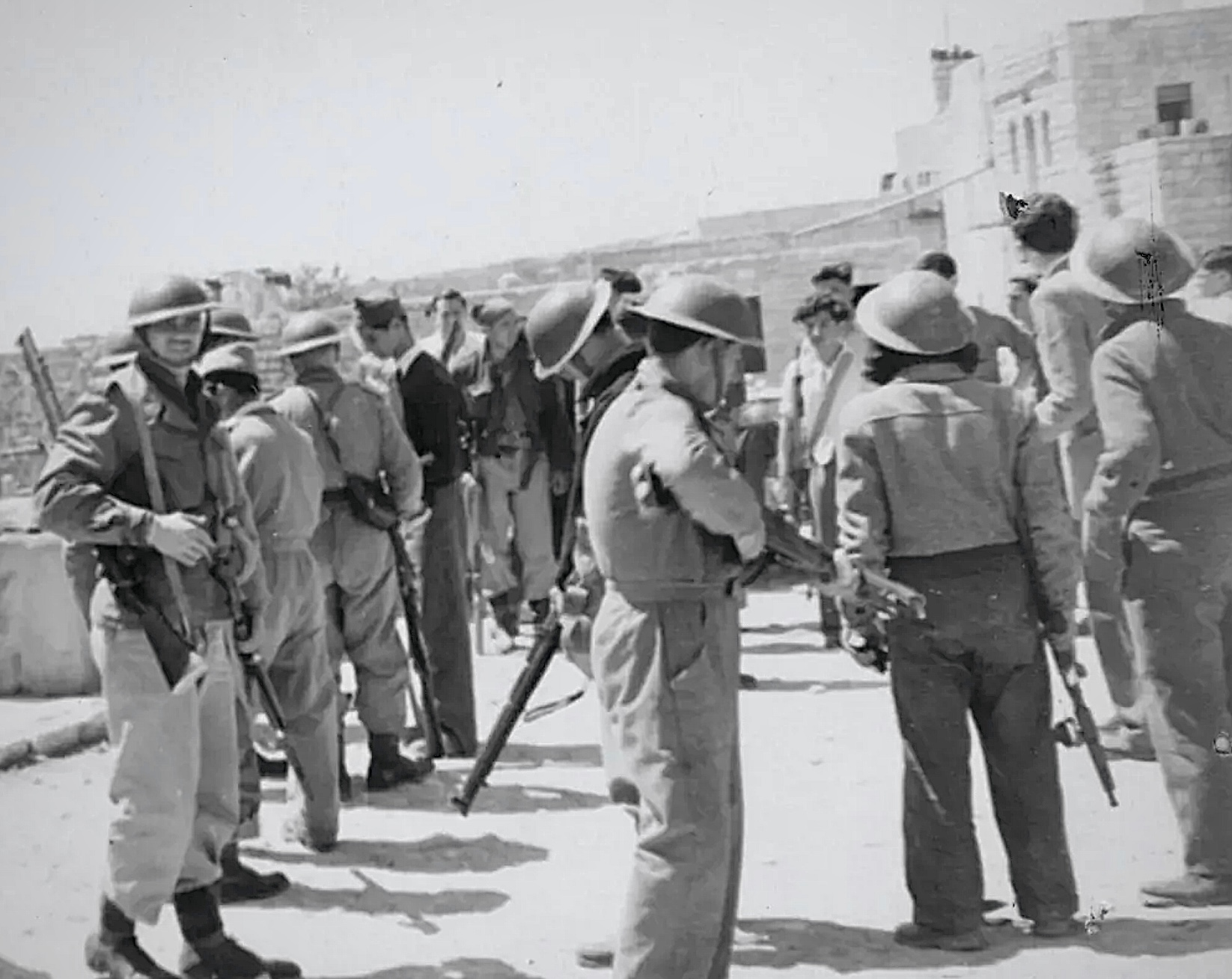
- Jewish paramilitaries in Deir Yassin, April 1948
- Location: 31°47′12″N 35°10′42″E; Deir Yassin, Mandatory Palestine
- Date: 9 April 1948 (Note: Historian Matthew Hogan considers the massacre to have taken place over multiple days, "between 9 and 11 April 1948")
- Target: Palestinian Arab villagers
- Weapons: Firearms, grenades, and explosives
- Deaths: 101–140 Palestinian Arab villagers and 5 attackers
- Injuries: 50–70 villagers and 28–35 Jewish militiamen (Note: Gelber claims 35 wounded, which Morris sees as an exaggeration.)
- Perpetrators: Zionist militant groups Irgun and Lehi, supported by the Haganah and Palmach (Note: Benny Morris, Righteous Victims - "The most important event during Operation Nahshon was probably the conquest by the IZL and LHI, assisted by the Haganah, of the village of Deir Yassin")
- No. of participants: Around 120–130 Jewish militiamen
- Defender: Villagers
- Motive: Ethnic cleansing

The Deir Yassin massacre took place on 9 April 1948, when Zionist paramilitaries attacked the village of Deir Yassin near Jerusalem, then part of Mandatory Palestine, killing at least 107 Palestinian Arab villagers, including women and children. The attack was conducted primarily by the Irgun and Lehi, who were supported by the Haganah and Palmach. The massacre was carried out despite the village having agreed to a non-aggression pact. It occurred during the 1947–1948 civil war and was a central component of the Nakba and the 1948 Palestinian expulsion and flight.

On the morning of 9 April, Irgun and Lehi forces entered the village from different directions. (Note: Morris 2005: "The village was attacked just before dawn on 9 April. The dissident forces, mustering 130 troops, arrived from two directions") The Zionist militants massacred Palestinian Arab villagers, including women and children, using firearms and hand grenades, as they emptied the village of its residents house by house. (Note: Pappe 2006: "As they burst into the village, the Jewish soldiers sprayed the houses with machine-gun fire, killing many of the inhabitants.") (Note: Morris 2005: "They then advanced slowly from house to house, clearing each objective with grenades and rifle and submachine gun-fire, and sometimes, explosives. Whole families were killed both inside buildings and in the alleyways outside, as they rushed out to try to escape or surrender.") The inexperienced militias encountered resistance from armed villagers and suffered some casualties. (Note: Morris 2005: The IZL troops, untrained and inexperienced in warfare (apart from terrorism), met stiff resistance and took casualties; their commander, Ben-Zion Cohen, was hit in the leg and evacuated.) The Haganah directly supported the operation, providing ammunition and covering fire, and two Palmach squads entered the village as reinforcement. (Note: Morris 2005: "In the course of the battle, the dissidents ran low on ammunition and asked for and obtained thousands of rounds from the Haganah; Haganah squads also provided covering fire and fired on the refugees fleeing southward, towards “Ein Karim. Two squads of the Palmah (the elite strike force of the Haganah) also arrived on the scene and helped evacuate the wounded and take some of the houses.") A number of villagers were taken captive and paraded through West Jerusalem before being executed.

In addition to the killing, there was widespread looting and there may have been cases of mutilation and rape. For decades, it was believed that 254 Palestinian Arabs had been killed, although present scholarship puts the death toll at around 110. By the end of the operation, all of the villagers had been expelled (Note: Morris 2005 "The remaining villagers were then expelled.") and the Haganah took control of the village. In 1949, the village was resettled by Israelis, becoming part of Givat Shaul.

News of the killings was widely publicized, sparking terror among Palestinians across the country, frightening many to flee their homes in anticipation of further violence against civilians by advancing Jewish forces. The massacre greatly accelerated the 1948 Palestinian expulsion and flight and strengthened the resolve of Arab governments to intervene, which they did five weeks later, beginning the 1948 Arab–Israeli war. The Haganah denied its role in the attack and publicly condemned the massacre, blaming it on the Irgun and Lehi, and the Jewish Agency for Palestine (which controlled the Haganah), sent Jordan's King Abdullah a letter of apology, which Abdullah rejected, holding them responsible. (Note: Benny Morris, 1948: A History of the First Arab-Israeli War (2008), "The atrocities were condemned by the Jewish Agency, the Haganah command, and the Yishuv's two chief rabbis, and the agency sent King Abdullah a letter condemning the atrocities and apologizing (which he rebuffed, saying that "the Jewish Agency stands at the head of all Jewish affairs in Palestine").") Four days after the Deir Yassin massacre, on 13 April, a reprisal attack on the Hadassah medical convoy in Jerusalem ended in a massacre killing 78 Jews, most of whom were medical staff. Material in Israeli military archives documenting the Deir Yassin massacre remains classified.

== Background ==
=== Political and military situation ===
The attack on Deir Yassin took place a few months after the beginning of the 1947-1948 civil war in Mandatory Palestine, which broke out after the announcement of the 1947 UN Partition Plan, which sought to divide Palestine into separate Arab and Jewish states.

Operation Nachshon was a Haganah operation to open the Tel Aviv – Jerusalem road, which had been blockaded by Palestinian Arabs as part of the Battle for Jerusalem, leaving the 100,000 Jews in Jerusalem with limited food, fuel or munitions. Historian Benny Morris writes that "the most important event during Operation Nahshon was probably the conquest by the IZL and LHI, assisted by the Haganah, of the village of Deir Yassin" and that the Palmach also assisted. Ilan Pappé writes that the Irgun, Lehi, and Haganah "were united into one military army during the days of the Nakba (although [...] they did not always act in unison and coordination)", and that Operation Nachshon was "the first operation in which all the various Jewish military organisations endeavoured to act together as a single army – providing the basis for the future Israeli Defence Forces (IDF)".

=== Plan Dalet and the role of the Haganah ===
Historians Ilan Pappé and Walid Khalidi consider the attack to have been a part of Plan Dalet, which Pappé calls "a blueprint for ethnic cleansing". In The Ethnic Cleansing of Palestine (2006), Pappé writes that:

"The systematic nature of Plan Dalet is manifested in Deir Yassin, a pastoral and cordial village that had reached a non-aggression pact with the Hagana in Jerusalem, but was doomed to be wiped out because it was within the areas designated in Plan Dalet to be cleanse".

Walid Khalidi also emphasized "the connection between the Haganah’s “Plan Dalet” [...] and what happened in Deir Yassin, explicitly linking the expulsion of the inhabitants to the Haganah’s overall planning". Khalidi states that the Haganah was involved in the attack on Deir Yassin through all stages, coordinating with and sending in the Irgun and Lehi forces, as well as participating in the fighting directly.

Prior to the attack on Deir Yassin the Haganah had conducted a number of wartime massacres such as the Al-Khisas raid on 18 December 1947, the Balad Al-Shayk massacre on 31 December 1947, and the Sa'sa' massacre on 14 February 1948.

Pappé considers that the Haganah sent in the Irgun and Lehi "to absolve themselves from any official accountability."

=== Irgun and Lehi militias ===
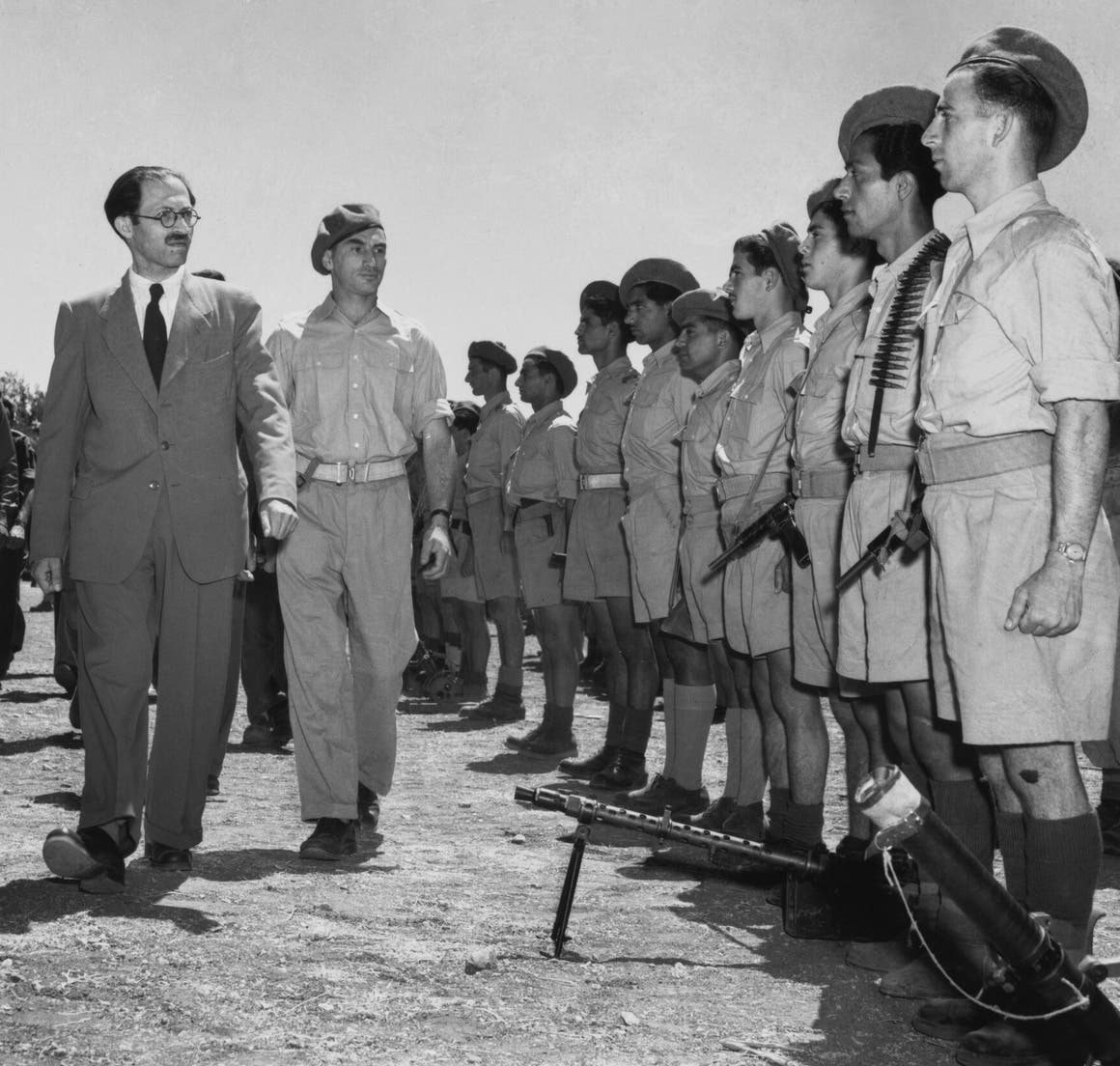
Menachem Begin (left) inspecting members of the Irgun in Jerusalem, August 1948.

Most of the Jewish forces that attacked Deir Yassin belonged to two extremist, underground, militias, the Irgun (Etzel, abbreviated IZL) (National Military Organization), led by Menachem Begin, and the Lehi (Fighters for the Freedom of Israel, abbreviated F.F.I.), also known as the Stern Gang, after their first leader Avraham Stern, both aligned with the right-wing Revisionist Zionist movement.

Formed in 1931, Irgun was a militant group that broke away from the mainstream Jewish militia, the Haganah. During the 1936–39 Arab revolt in Palestine, in which Palestinian Arabs rose up against the British mandate authorities in protest at Jewish mass immigration into the country, Irgun's tactics had included bus and marketplace bombings, condemned by both the British and the Jewish Agency. Lehi, an Irgun splinter group, was formed in 1940 following Irgun's decision to declare a truce with the British during World War II. Lehi subsequently carried out a series of assassinations designed to force the British out of Palestine. In April 1948, it was estimated that the Irgun had 300 fighters in Jerusalem, and Lehi around 100. The Lehi were viewed as fringe extremists.

Both groups had committed numerous terror attacks against the British and the Arabs and historian Matthew Hogan writes that:

"Another organizational ethos, deliberate terror, undoubtedly constituted a principal factor in the massacre. The Irgun's self-admitted operational tactics were 'terror, bombs, [and] assassination'."

Deir Yassin would be their first proper military operation and the groups were keen to show their rival, the Haganah, their combat prowess. The two groups often worked together near Jerusalem. They had already attempted a small joint operation the previous year. On 21 April 1947, an Irgun militant joined a Lehi suicide operation, with the personal approval of Irgun commander Menachem Begin. The Deir Yassin massacre, and the militants who blew themselves up, are now featured in the Lehi Museum in Tel Aviv. The exhibit about the Deir Yassin says, "The village was conquered in a joint Lehi-Irgun operation".

=== Deir Yassin ===
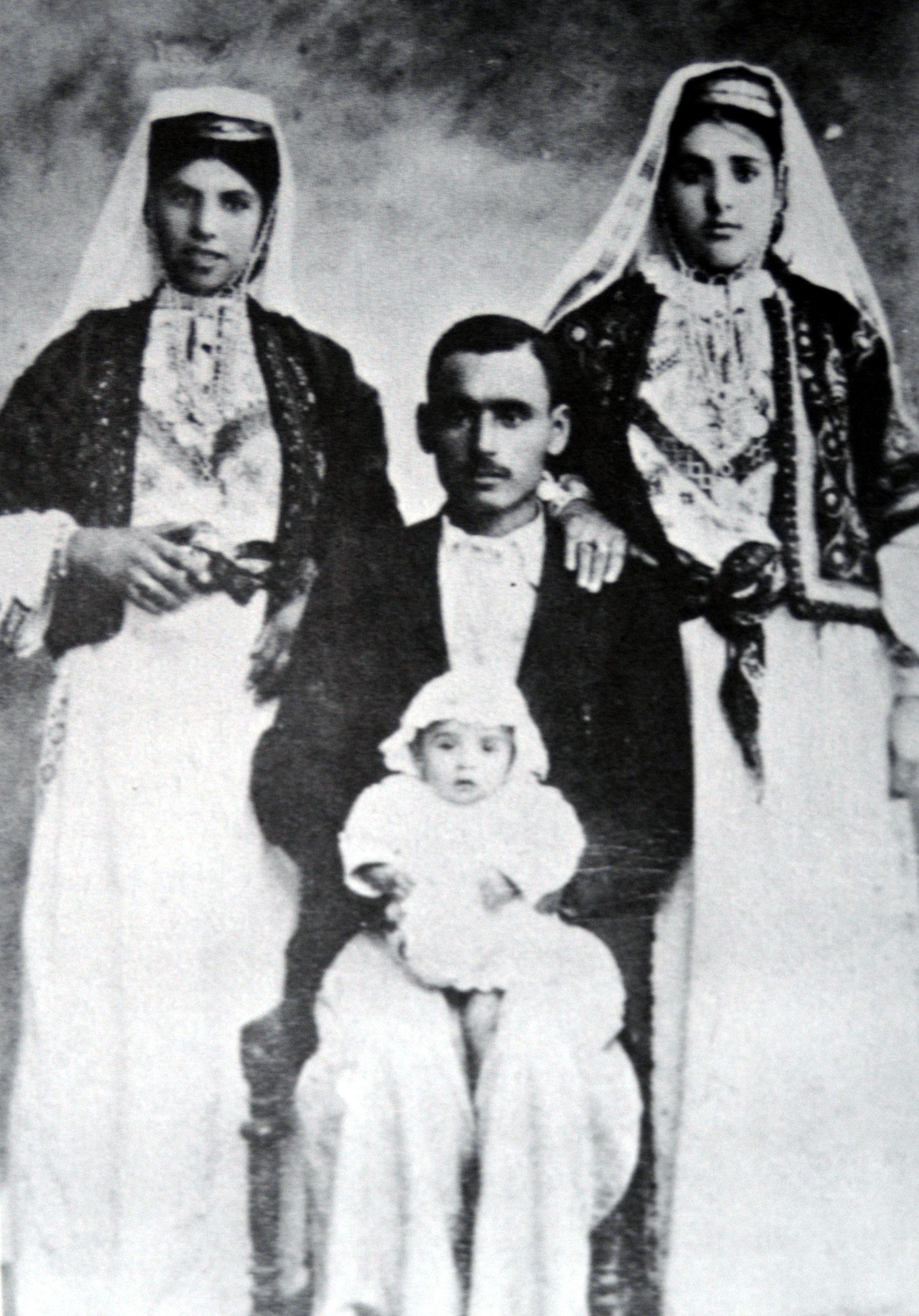
A family from Deir Yassin, 1927

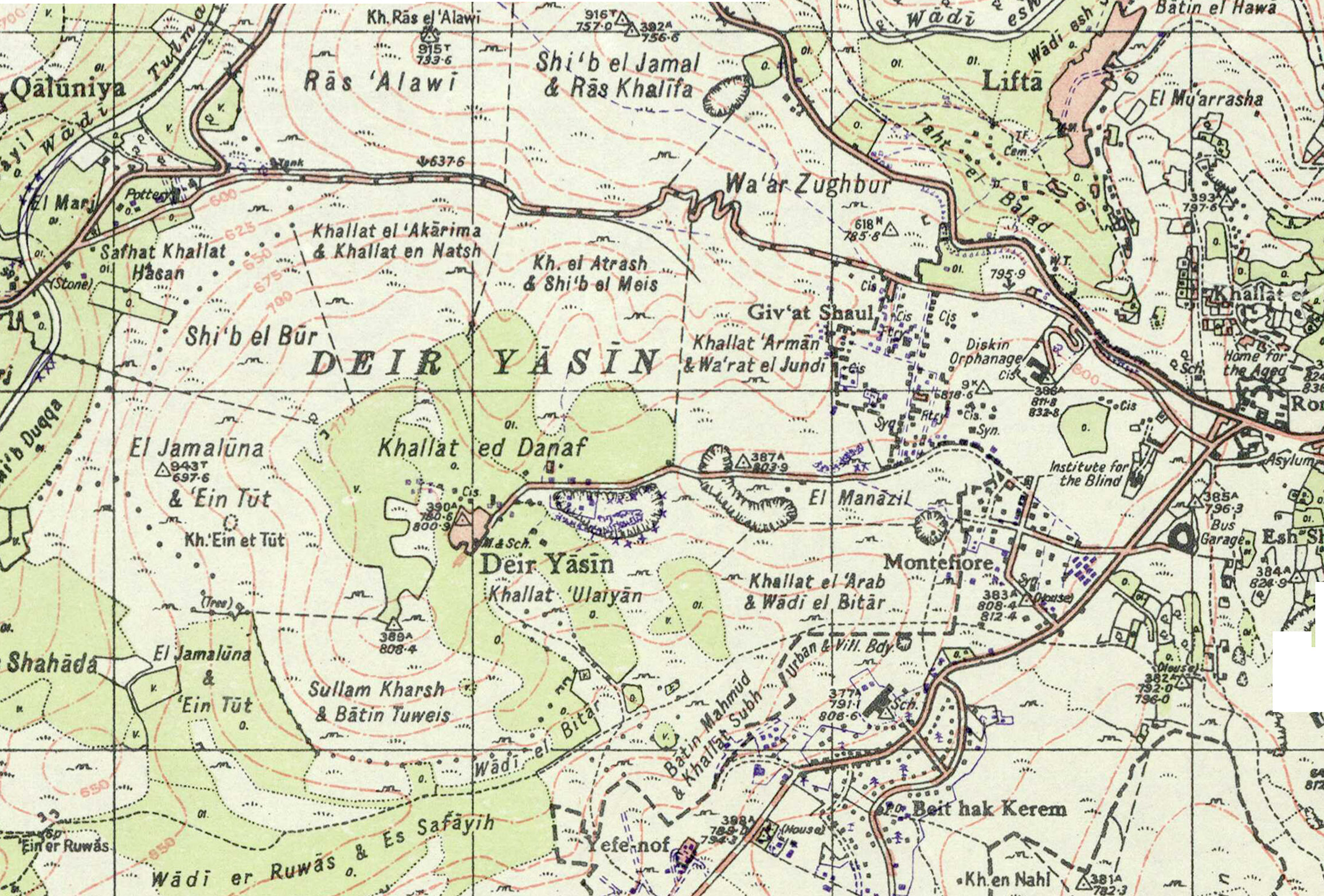
Deir Yassin and surrounds in 1948

Deir Yassin was a Palestinian Arab village of several hundred residents, all Muslim, living in 144 houses. The International Committee of the Red Cross reported that there were 400 residents; Yoav Gelber writes that there were 610, citing the British mandatory authority figures; and Begin's biographer, Eric Silver, 800 to 1,000. Walid Khalidi writes that the population was approximately 750.

The village was situated on a hill 800 meters above sea level and two kilometers south of the Tel Aviv highway. It bordered West Jerusalem's Jewish suburbs; Givat Shaul, an Orthodox community, just across the valley 700 meters to the northeast, and Beit HaKerem to the southeast. The closest Arab towns were Qalunya a few kilometers to the northwest and Ein Karem a few kilometers to the southwest, where the Arab Liberation Army had set up a base. Cutting through Ein Karem and Deir Yassin was the Sharafa ridge (Mount Herzl), a strategically important elevation that the Haganah had taken earlier.

The village's prosperity was one reason for the assault, and when the village was captured there was widespread looting and robbery of its residents.

By most accounts, the villagers lived in peace with their Jewish neighbors, particularly those in Givat Shaul, some of whom reportedly tried to help the villagers during the Irgun–Lehi massacre.

==== Peace pact ====
On 20 January 1948, the villagers met leaders of the Givat Shaul community to form a peace pact. The Deir Yassin villagers agreed to inform Givat Shaul should Palestinian militiamen appear in the village, by hanging out certain types of laundry during the day—two white pieces with a black piece in the middle—and at night signaling three dots with a flashlight and placing three lanterns in a certain place. In return, patrols from Givat Shaul guaranteed safe passage to Deir Yassin residents, in vehicles or on foot, passing through their neighborhood on the way to Jerusalem. Yoma Ben-Sasson, Haganah commander in Givat Shaul, said after the village had been captured that, "there was not even one incident between Deir Yassin and the Jews." The view was echoed in a secret Haganah report which stated that the village had stayed "faithful allies of the western [Jerusalem] sector".

Gelber viewed it is unlikely that the peace pact between Deir Yassin and Givat Shaul continued to hold in April, given the intensity of hostilities between the Arab and Jewish communities elsewhere. On 4 April the Haganah affiliated daily Davar reported that "[t]he western neighborhoods of Jerusalem, Beit Hakerem and Bayit Vagan, was attacked on Sabbath night (2 April) by fire from the direction of Deir Yassin, Ein Kerem and Colonia." Over the next few days, the Jewish community at Motza and Jewish traffic on the road to Tel Aviv came under fire from the village. On 8 April, some villagers from Deir Yassin took part in the defence of the Arab village of al-Qastal, which the Jews had invaded days earlier: the names of several Deir Yassin residents appeared on a list of wounded compiled by the British Palestine police.

==== Relationship with Arab militia fighters ====
Arab militiamen had tried to set up camp in the village, leading to a firefight that saw one villager killed. Just before 28 January, Abd al-Qadir al-Husayni had arrived with 400 men and tried to recruit some villagers, but the elders voiced their opposition and the men moved on. The leader of the village, the mukhtar, was summoned to Jerusalem to explain to the Arab Higher Committee (AHC), the Palestinian Arab leadership, what the village's relationship was with the Jews: he told them the villagers and the Jews lived in peace. No steps were taken against him, and he was not asked to cancel the peace pact.

In February, Arab irregular fighters killed the sheep in Deir Yassin as a retaliation for the village not allowing their forces to use Deir Yassin as base from which to attack Givat Shaul. (Note: Morris 2006. Quotation: "During the following months, the villagers refused to provide troops for ‘Abd al Qadir al Husseini’s armed band and repeatedly kept out irregulars. In January, a villager was killed in a fire-fight with visiting irregulars after the villagers denied them the use of their houses as a base of attack. (It was after this incident that the villagers approached the HIS for the nonbelligerency agreement.) In February, to signal their displeasure, irregulars slaughtered the village’s sheep after the villagers refused to allow them to use Deir Yassin as a springboard for attacking Giv’at Shaul.") On 16 March, the AHC sent a delegation to the village to request that it host a group of Iraqi and Syrian irregulars to guard it. The villagers said no then, and again on 4 April. Benny Morris notes that Menachem Begin at the time didn't mention attacks from the village or a presence of foreign militiamen as he would do years later. Yoav Gelber also writes that there is no evidence of militiamen in the village and finds no reason to believe that there were any.

=== Planning ===
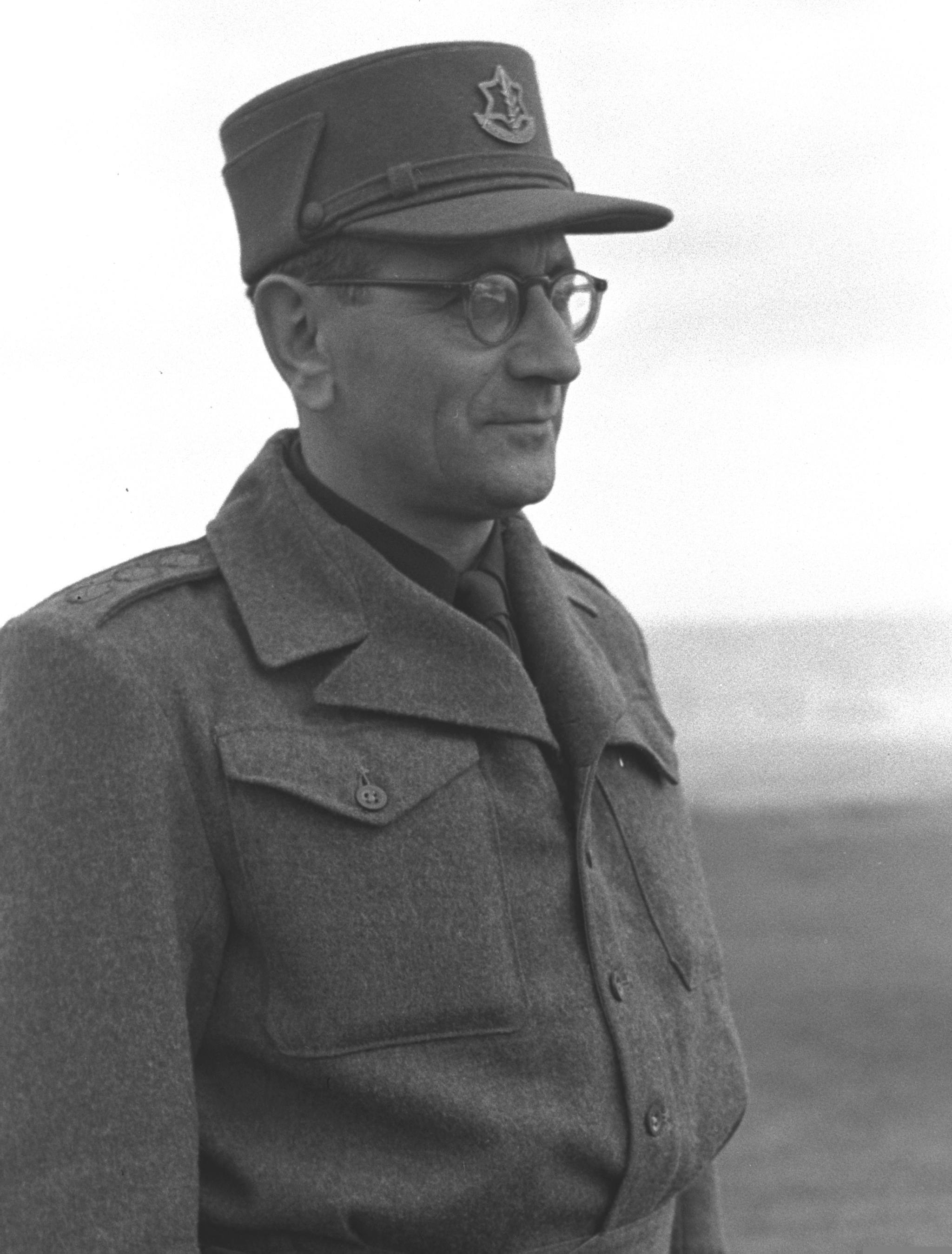
David Shaltiel, Haganah commander in Jerusalem, approved the attack.

It remains unclear the exact extent the Haganah coordinated with the Irgun and Lehi in their attack on Deir Yassin, although at the very least Haganah commander David Shaltiel preapproved of the attack (with some sources describing this approval as having been given "reluctantly"). Shaltiel suggested attacking Ein Karem instead, but the Lehi and Irgun commanders complained that this would be too hard for them. Shaltiel ultimately yielded, on condition that the attackers would continue to occupy the village rather than destroying it, lest its ruins be used by Arab militias which would force the Jews to reconquer it. Shaltiel wrote a letter to both Lehi commander Yehoshua Zettler and Irgun commander Mordechai Raanan, stating:

"I have heard that you are planning to carry out an operation against Deir Yassin. I should like to draw your attention to the fact that the capture of Deir Yassin and holding it is a stage in our overall plan. I have nothing against your carrying out the operation, on condition that you have the forces to hold it." (Note: Eric Silver, Begin: The Haunted Prophet. Silver writes in a footnote following this letter: "Full text translated from David Shaltiel, Jerusalem 1948, Tel Aviv, Ministry of Defence, 1981, pages 139-43(in Hebrew).")

Shaltiel's approval of the operation met resistance within the Haganah. Pa'il objected to violating the peace pact with the village, but Shaltiel maintained that he had no power to stop them. Pa'il said in 1998 that Levi had proposed that the inhabitants be notified, but Shaltiel had refused to endanger the operation by warning them. David Siton of Lehi claimed he also protested because the village was docile:

I said that an operation like that would hurt the Jewish neighborhoods in the western part of the city, but IZL people said that the inhabitants of Deir Yassin were getting ready to attack Jewish neighborhoods. We checked, and found out it was not true. Our chaps entered the village, talked to the Arabs and heard from then that they were not interested in harming the Jews, and that they are men of peace.

According to Morris, it was agreed during planning meetings that the residents would be expelled. Lehi further proposed that any villagers who failed to flee should be killed to terrify the rest of the country's Arabs. According to the testimony of the commander of the operation, Ben-Zion Cohen, most of the Irgun and Lehi fighters at preparatory meetings agreed the aim should be one of the "liquidation of all the men in the village and any other force that opposed us, whether it be old people, women, or children."

== Massacre ==
=== Day of the attack ===
==== Pre-attack briefing ====
About 130 fighters participated in the attack of which 70 came from Irgun, according to Morris. Hogan estimates that there were 132 men; 72 from Irgun, 60 from Lehi, and some women serving in supporting roles. The scant arsenal was divided as follows. The Irgunists got one of the three Bren machine guns, Lehi got the other and the third was used for the loudspeaker vehicle. Each rifleman got 40 bullets, each person with a Sten gun 100 bullets, and each fighter two hand grenades. The stretcher bearers only got clubs. They had no communication equipment. Despite their confidence, the fighters, most of them teenagers, were by all accounts ill-prepared, untrained, and inexperienced.

==== Beginning of attack ====
After the briefing, the fighters were driven to their assigned positions. The Irgun force approached Deir Yassin from the east and south, arriving at the edge of the village at about 4:30 AM, 9 April. The Lehi force was supposed to be taking their positions around the village at the same time but were in fact late. The Irgun commanders had no way to contact them, and had to assume they were on schedule. Following the Lehi group were Pa'il and a photographer. He wanted to observe the revisionists' fighting capabilities.

There are conflicting accounts as to the details of the beginning of the attack, but at some point after the Irgun entered the village shooting began. Irgun forces came under fire from a three-man village guard in a concrete pillbox, and from houses in the village as residents scrambled for their rifles to join the battle, firing out of windows. The Irgun men replied with withering fire towards the pillbox and into the village.

When the Lehi force, which was late, finally arrived at the other end of the village to begin the attack, the fighting was already underway. The Lehi force was spearheaded by an armored vehicle with a loudspeaker. (Note: Sources diverge on whether the armored vehicle was a "truck" or a "car".) The plan was to drive the vehicle into the center of the village and blare a warning in Arabic, urging the residents to run towards Ein Karim. Instead, the vehicle halted or overturned at a ditch directly in front of the village, and as it struggled to get out, the Arabs opened fire on it. Whether a warning was read out on the loudspeaker is unknown. Yachin stated that it was:

After we filled in the ditch we continued travelling. We passed two barricades and stopped in front of the third, 30 meters away from the village. One of us called out on the loudspeaker in Arabic, telling the inhabitants to put down their weapons and flee. I don't know if they heard, and I know these appeals had no effect.

Abu Mahmoud, a survivor, told the BBC in 1998 that he did hear the warning:

They tried to terrify us into leaving the village and running away. The loudspeaker kept saying, ‘Stop the fighting, retreat, run for your lives, put down your weapons.’

Aref Samir stated that he didn't hear the warning:

Many times [previously] a curfew had been imposed on the village, and when the British loudspeaker would call out at one end of the village, I could here it at the other end; moreover, a shout from Givat Shaul, even without a loudspeaker, would be clearly heard in our village. On the morning of that day we heard nothing. No loudspeaker and no shouts. We awoke to the sound of shots.

If a warning was read out it was obscured due to the sounds of heavy gunfire and few, if any, villagers heard it.

Irgun and Lehi commanders had believed the residents would flee, but the fighters encountered resistance. The residents did not realize that the point of the attack was conquest, thinking it was just a raid. The villagers' sniper fire from higher positions in the west, especially from the mukhtar's house, effectively contained the attack. Some Lehi units went for help from the Haganah's Camp Schneller in Jerusalem. The men had no experience of attacking an Arab village in daylight, and lacked support weapons. Following an order from Ben-Zion Cohen, the Irgun commander, they resorted to house-to-house attacks, throwing grenades into every house before charging in and spraying the rooms with automatic fire.

The Lehi forces slowly advanced, engaging in house-to-house fighting. In addition to Arab resistance, they also faced other problems; weapons failed to work, a few tossed hand grenades without pulling the pin, and a Lehi unit commander, Amos Kenan, was wounded by his own men. In an interview decades later, Yachin claimed "To take a house, you had either to throw a grenade or shoot your way into it. If you were foolish enough to open doors, you got shot down—sometimes by men dressed up as women, shooting out at you in a second of surprise." Meanwhile, the Irgun force on the other side of the village was also having a difficult time. It took about two hours of house-to-house fighting to reach the center of the village.

==== Irgun considers retreat ====
By 7:00 a.m., as many as four attackers had been killed. Ben-Zion Cohen, the top Irgun commander, was wounded in the leg. After being shot, he gave an order: 'there's no woman, no man. [We're] blowing up as many houses as possible, and killing anyone who shoots. Approach the building, lay the explosives, activate them, fall back, blow up the building with all its inhabitants after they've opened fire. Immediately after the explosion, we go, because they're in shock, and the first thing is to [shoot] bursts right and left.' He was replaced by Lapidot. Irgun commander Yehuda Segal was shot in the stomach and later died. Irgun commanders relayed a message to the Lehi camp that they were considering retreating. Lehi commanders relayed back that they had already entered the village and expected victory soon.

Frustration over the lack of progress and Arab resistance was taken out on the prisoners whom they began executing. Cohen reported that "we eliminated every Arab we came across up to that point." Yehuda Feder of Lehi a few days after the attack wrote that about machine gunning three Arab prisoners: "In the village I killed an armed Arab man and two Arab girls of 16 or 17 who were helping the Arab who was shooting. I stood them against a wall and blasted them with two rounds from the Tommy gun." Irgun officer Yehoshua Gorodenchik claimed that 80 prisoners were killed:

We had prisoners, and before the retreat we decided to liquidate them. We also liquidated the wounded, as anyway we could not give them first aid. In one place, about eighty Arab prisoners were killed after some of them had opened fire and killed one of the people who came to give them first aid. Arabs who dressed up as Arab women were also found, and so they started to shoot the women also who did not hurry to the area where the prisoners were concentrated.

Aref Samir in 1981 stated:

From 5:00 A.M. until about 11:00 A.M. there was a systematic slaughter, with them going from house to house. From the eastern edge of the village nobody came out unhurt. Whole families were slaughtered. At 6:00 in the morning they caught 21 young people from the village, about 25 years old, they stood them in a row, near where the post-office is today, and executed them. Many women who watched this horrifying spectacle went crazy, and some are in institutions to this day. A pregnant woman, who was coming back with her son from the bakery, was murdered and her belly was smashed, after her son was killed before her eyes. In one of the conquered village houses a Bren machine gun was set up, which shot everyone who got in its line of fire. My cousin went out to see what happened to his uncle, who was shot a few minutes before, and he was killed too. His father, who went out after him, was murdered by the same Bren, and the mother, who came to find out what happened to her loved ones, died beside them. Aish eydan, who was a guard in Givat Shaul, came to see what was happening, and he was killed.

Gelber writes that Gorodenchik's figure was inflated and has not been corroborated. Kan'ana write that 25 villagers were executed and thrown into the quarry after the battle, which Gelber regards as accurate. According to survivor testimony, as many as 33 civilians were executed in the morning.

The large number of Jewish wounded was a problem. Zalman Meret called the Magen David Adom station for an ambulance. The fighters took beds out of the houses, and doors off their hinges, laid the wounded on them, and ordered Arab women to carry the injured to the ambulance in order to discourage fire from the villagers. According to Gorodenchik, the Arab stretcher bearers were hit by fire. The ambulance left with some of the wounded at 8:00 am.

When the attackers ran low on ammunition, Lehi people went to Camp Schneller to request ammunition from the Haganah. Weg wasn't in the camp and his deputy Moshe Eren refused to make a decision. When Weg returned he gave them 3,000 bullets. They also asked for weapons which Weg refused them. Haganah squads also provided covering fire, firing on villagers fleeing south towards Ein Karem and preventing any Arab reinforcements from reaching the village.

==== Use of explosives ====
The doors of the houses in Deir Yassin were made of iron and not wood, as the attackers had thought, and they had difficulty breaking into the houses. Lapidot sent word to Raanan, who was watching the progress from Givat Shaul, to send explosives. Soon afterward, Raanan and his aides appeared with knapsacks filled with TNT. The Irgun fighters were instructed to dynamite houses as they advanced. Under covering fire, the dynamite teams advanced and set charges to houses. In certain instances, the force of the explosions destroyed entire parts of houses, burying the Arabs inside them. A total of 15 houses were blown up.

Zeidan recalled hiding with her family and another when the door was blasted open. The attackers took them outside where they executed an already wounded man and one of his daughters. Two of her own family members were then killed: "Then they called my brother Mahmoud and shot him in our presence, and when my mother screamed and bent over my brother (she was carrying my little sister Khadra who was still being breastfed) they shot my mother too."

Whether houses were blown up or not is disputed. American historian Matthew Hogan claims that they weren't. He cites Pa'il who in his testimony said he was sure that "no house in Deir Yassin was bombed" and says that independent visitors to the village after its fall didn't mention structural damage; among them Eliyahu Arbel, a Haganah operations officer, recalled finding dead inside the houses but "with no signs of battle and not as a result of blowing up houses", and Irgunist Menachem Adler, who didn't participate in the attack, but visited the village a few days later, said "I didn't see the destruction that is always recounted." Hogan believes that "it is unlikely that the inexperienced and undersupplied fighters under fire efficiently maneuvered explosives around defended houses." He further argues that if explosives were used, the number of wounded and dismembered bodies would have been much higher. Instead, Hogan claims that the explosives story were used by the perpetrators to explain the high number of deaths as the result of combat rather than as a deliberate massacre.

==== The Palmach joins the attack ====
Some time later, two Palmach units arrived, commanded by Weg and Moshe Eren in two armored vehicles and carrying two two-inch mortars. Exactly when is unclear; Milstein writes "at noon," Hogan "about 10:00 am." Weg described the intervention in his report:

I was in the area securing the road from Colonia to Jerusalem. At 6:30 I was informed about Deir Yassin and their desperate situation, because they were unable to get their wounded out. They ask for arms, cover and personnel, since they didn't have any professionals. I asked permission of the district commander, via the battalion intelligence officer. The answer was: 'You are to go out and provide cover for taking out the wounded only' — I met with the commanders in both groups and asked for a map and demanded a detailed explanation --- they explained that they had no contact except by runners --- they mentioned a certain house in the west of the village. ––– there were 25 men there with two machine guns and rifles, who were pinned down by snipers. There was no officer among them and the men did not obey orders, since they belonged to different groups. I shot 3 shells at the north wing of the building. After the shelling the shooting stopped --- I reported to the district commander and got an order: "you must be ready to cover removal of wounded or retreat, but you mustn't intervene in any battle action."

Pa'il said that it was Moshe Idelstein that asked Weg for help:

Soon after that I saw Yaki Weg, a young Palmach company commander, driving up the steep northern slope to the western village with about 15–17 guys. He occupied that part of the village in about 15 minutes. After I joined him, he told me that he had been sent with some people from Camp Schneller to deploy his men on the main ridge, where the cemetery is today, commanding the main road to Jerusalem, because there was supposed to be a convoy that day. He said that Moshe Idelstein came to him and said they were attacking Deir Yassin two kilometers south of that ridge, and had run into trouble. He said he had to help Jews in trouble, so he had set up the mortar and assaulted the village with a group of his company.

The mortar was fired three times at the mukhtar's house, which stopped the sniper fire. Reviewing the situation, Weg concluded that the wounded could not be evacuated before suppressing all hostile fire. Thus, his mission expanded to capturing the village.

According to one Palmach fighter, "six of us went house to house, throwing grenades and bursting in." Lehi officer David Gottlieb said the Palmach had accomplished "in one hour what we could not accomplish in several hours". The story is corroborated by Palmach fighter Kalman Rosenblatt who said "Together with six [other] people I went from house to house. We threw grenades into the houses before we entered them. We met the Lehi and Etzel [Irgun] people in the middle of the village. Some of them joined us. Others said 'Until now, we fought, now you fight.' In the houses there were dead. The dissidents did not fight." Hogan writes that "The small Palmach unit's quick injury-free success, along with light guerrilla casualty figures, confirm that Deir Yassin's defense was neither tough nor professional."

==== End of resistance and further killings ====
As a result to the rapid work of the Palmach, the fighting was over by about 11:00 am. Some villagers escaped and Jewish wounded were treated. At about 11:30 am Cohen was evacuated. Meanwhile, the Palmachniks and the revisionists went house to house to "clean up" (Note: This phrase is used in many sources and appears to be a euphemism to describe the killing of remaining villagers) and secure them. Pa'il met Weg and urged him to get out of Deir Yassin: "get away from here! Don't get mixed up with the Irgun and Stern Gang [Lehi]." The Palmach unit withdrew to Camp Schneller soon thereafter. Pa'il regretted asking Weg to leave: "To this very day I am haunted by the mistake I made. I shouldn't have let Yaki and his men leave, but I didn't imagine there was going to be a massacre there. If those Palmach guys had stayed, the dissidents wouldn't have dared to commit a massacre. If we saw that, we would have cocked our guns and told them to stop."

In 1972, Raanan told a journalist that his men had found the house where Segal had fallen. Nine people in a nearby house that the attackers intended to blow open surrendered, including a woman and a child. The person with the Bren machine gun, shouted "This is for Yiftah [Segal's nom de guerre]!" and gunned them down. Yisrael Natach was a member of the Shai and were on the day stationed in Ein Karem. He heard stories from the arriving villagers that fled Deir Yassin that one Arab fighter had disguised himself as a woman which triggered the attackers' rage:

Refugees arrives from Deir Yassin and related that the Jews found out that Arab warriors had disguised themselves as women. The Jews searched the women too. One of the people being checked noticed that he had been caught, took out a pistol and shot the Jewish commander. His friends, crazy with anger, shot in all directions and killed the Arabs in the area.

Pa'il recalled hearing the shooting start anew:

The fighting was over, yet there was the sound of firing of all kinds from different houses. Sporadic firing, not like you would hear when they clear a house. I took my chap with me and went to see what was happening. We went into houses. ... In the corners we saw dead bodies. Almost all the dead were old people, children or women, with a few men here and there. They stood them up in the corners and shot them. In another corner there were some more bodies, in the next house more bodies and so on. They also shot people running from houses, and prisoners. Mostly women and children. Most of the Arab males had run away. It is an odd thing, but when there is danger such as this, the agile ones run away first. ...

I couldn't tell if it was Lehi people or Etzel people doing the killing. They went about with glazed eyes as though entranced with killing. ...

... I did not know their commanders, and I didn't want to expose myself, because people were going around there, as I wrote in my report, with their eyes rolled about in their sockets. Today I would write that their eyes were glazed over, full of lust for murder. It seemed to be going on everywhere. Eventually it turned out that in the Lehi sector there were more murders, but I didn't know that then. I didn't know what to do.

Mohammed Jabar, a boy at the time, remembered hiding under a bed and observing the attackers "break in, drive everybody outside, put them against the wall and shoot them." He claimed one of the victims was a mother with her baby. Zeinab Akkel claimed she offered her life savings to an attacker in exchange for sparing her younger brothers life: "my husband had given me $400. I offered it ... and said, 'Please leave my brother alone, he is so young.'" He took the money "and shot him in the head with five bullets." Zeidan, who was taken prisoner, recalled meeting another group of captives: "We walked with some other women from the village, then came across a young man and an older man, with their hands up in the air, under guard." "When they reached us, the soldiers shot them." The young man's mother was in Zeidan's group and she started hitting the fighters that killed her son, so "one of them stabbed her with a knife a few times."

Houses and corpses were pillaged and money and jewelry were stolen from prisoners. Shaltiel got reports on what was happening in Deir Yassin and sent Gichon there to convince the revisionists to stop the massacre. The revisionists were initially reluctant to let him enter:

Before we got to the village we saw people carrying bodies to the quarry each of Deir Yassin. We entered the village around 3:00 in the afternoon. Shots were heard. Shots were heard. They stopped me at the entrance. I identified myself, and said that my mission was to check the situation in the village, and I demanded that I be allowed to enter. The said 'You will not enter, and if you try we will open fire on you'. I said I would use force. They consulted, and suggested that I come in alone, without my people. I agreed, and the people of my platoon waited outside the village. Afterwards people calmed down and they let some of my men enter.

Gichon told them "not to throw the bodies into cisterns and caves, because that was the first place that would be checked." He described beatings, looting, and the stripping of jewelry and money from prisoners. He wrote that the initial orders were to take the men prisoner and send the women and children away, but the order was changed to kill all the prisoners. The mukhtar's son was killed in front of his mother and sisters, he said. The most detailed report comes from Pa'il who spied on the revisionists on behalf of the Haganah:

The dissidents were going about the village robbing and stealing everything: Chickens, radio sets, sugar, money, gold and more ... Each dissident walked about the village dirty with blood and proud of the number of persons he had killed. Their lack of education and intelligence as compared to our soldiers [i.e., the Haganah] was apparent.

Pa'il writes that the Haredi people of Givat Shaul came to help the villagers at around 2 p.m., and were able to stop the killing:

[A] crowd of people from Givat Shaul, with peyot (earlocks), most of them religious, came into the village and started yelling "gazlanim" "rotzchim"—(thieves, murderers) "we had an agreement with this village. It was quiet. Why are you murdering them?" They were Chareidi (ultra-orthodox) Jews. This is one of the nicest things I can say about Hareidi [sic] Jews. These people from Givat Shaul gradually approached and entered the village, and the Lehi and Irgun people had no choice, they had to stop. It was about 2:00 or 3:00 PM. Then the Lehi and Irgun gathered about 250 people, most of them women, children and elderly people in a school house. Later the building became a "Beit Habad"—"Habad House". They were debating what to do with them. There was a great deal of yelling. The dissidents were yelling "Let's blow up the schoolhouse with everyone in it" and the Givat Shaul people were yelling "thieves and murderers—don't do it" and so on. Finally they put the prisoners from the schoolhouse on four trucks and drove them to the Arab quarter of Jerusalem near the Damascus gate. I left after the fourth truck went out.

It was Friday afternoon. It must have been about 4:00–5:00 P.M because the religious people had begun leaving to prepare for the Sabbath.

Pa'il went home and wrote a report about what he had seen while his photographer developed the negatives. The next day he submitted his report.

Morris writes that the killing continued after 9 April. Some villagers who had either hidden or pretended to be dead were apparently killed by Lehi men on 10 or 11 April.

==== Trucking and parading of prisoners ====
During the day, prisoners were loaded into trucks that came to and departed from Deir Yassin. Some were paraded through the streets of West Jerusalem, where they were jeered, spat at, and stoned, some were released in East Jerusalem and some were returned to Deir Yassin where they were executed. Harry Levin, a Haganah broadcaster, reported seeing "three trucks driving slowly up and down King George V Avenue bearing men, women, and children, their hands above their heads, guarded by Jews armed with sten-guns and rifles." Haganah intelligence officer Mordechai Gichon wrote on 10 April:

The adult males were taken to town in trucks and paraded in the city streets, then taken back to the site and killed with rifle and machine-gun fire. Before they [i.e, other inhabitants] were put on the trucks, the IZL and LHI men... took from them all the jewelry and stole their money. The behavior toward them was especially barbaric [and included] kicks, shoves with rifle butts, spitting and cursing (people from Givat Shaul took part in the torture).

Pa'il reported that he saw five Arab men being paraded through the streets, and later saw their bodies in a quarry near Givat Shaul. Morris writes that this is supported by two Jewish doctors who visited Deir Yassin on 12 April and reported that they found five male bodies in a house by the village quarry.

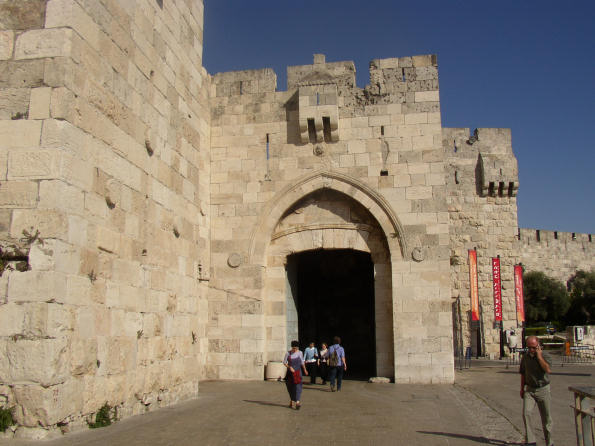
Fifty-five orphans from the village were left by the Jaffa Gate to fend for themselves.

Fifty-five children from the village whose parents had been killed were taken to the Jaffa Gate in Jerusalem's Old City, and left there. They were found by a Palestinian woman, Hind Husseini, a member of the prominent Palestinian Husseini family. She at first rented two rooms for them, bringing them food every day, before moving them to the Sahyoun convent. In July, she moved them again, this time to her family home, a large house her grandfather had built in Jerusalem in 1891. She renamed the house Dar Al-Tifl Al-Arabi (Arab Children's House), and set up a foundation to finance it. The orphanage continues to this day.

A Shai report from 12 April to Shaltiel read: "Some of the women and children were taken prisoner by the Lehi and transferred to Sheik Bader [Lehi's headquarter in Jerusalem]. Among the prisoners were a young woman and a baby. The camp guards killed the baby before the mother's eyes. After she fainted they killed her too."

=== Arab requests for British intervention ===
The Arab emergency committee in Jerusalem learned of the attack around nine in the morning of 9 April, including reports about the killing of women and children. They requested the help of the British, but did nothing further. In the late afternoon, they started to hear reports of women and children being paraded through the streets of Jerusalem. They sent the prisoners food and again appealed to the British army to intervene. High Commissioner Sir Alan Cunningham demanded that troops be sent to Deir Yassin. He was deeply concerned about his public image and worried of the fallout from not intervening. At the same time, however, Cunningham had become genuinely angry after reading accounts of the massacre, saying that those responsible had to be punished.

"At last you've got those bastards. For God's sake, go up there and get them!"

However, Lieutenant General Sir Gordon MacMillan, General Officer Commanding (GOC) of the British Forces in Palestine and Trans-Jordan, said he would risk British lives only for British interests. Gelber writes that the British were not keen to take on the Irgun and Lehi, who would have fought back if attacked, unlike the Haganah. At this, Cunningham turned to his RAF commanding officer, who offered to bomb the perpetrators in the village. The Mandate's Security Committee greenlighted high intensity punitive airstrikes on those responsible for the Deir Yassin massacre. However, the bombings were delayed since the light bombers had been sent to Egypt and the rockets to Iraq. Cunningham later said the RAF had brought a squadron of Tempest aircraft from Iraq to bomb the village, but he cancelled the operation when he learned the Haganah had arrived there and had garrisoned it. Nevertheless, he continued to express anger against the Zionist movement, particularly the Irgun and Lehi.

"The world must be told about these people, the Irgun and the Stern Gang – the absolute dregs of degradation."

=== Immediate aftermath ===
Historian Matthew Hogan writes that "The guerrillas' "cleanup" continued through Saturday and Sunday, 10–11 April, as Shaltiel pressed the guerrillas to stay and bury the dead." Lehi commander Yehoshua Zettler, who participated in the attack, described how some of the bodies of the victims were burned in an attempt to dispose of them. (Note: Haaretz 2017 "Zettler also provided a harsh account of the burning of the bodies of those who were killed, after the village was occupied. “Our guys made a number of mistakes there that made me angry. Why did they do that?” he said. “They took dead people, piled them up and burned them. There began to be a stink. This is not so simple.”")

==== Irgun–Lehi press conference ====
On the evening of 9 April, the fighters invited American journalists to a house in Givat Shaul, where they served tea and cookies while explaining the attacks. A spokesman said he regretted the casualties among the women and children, but they were inevitable because every house had to be reduced by force. Ten houses had been blown up entirely, he said, though historians doubt if that was true. Other houses had their doors blown off and hand grenades thrown inside.

==== The day after (10 April) ====
At a news conference on 10 April, Raanan untruthfully told reporters on 10 April that 254 Arab bodies had been counted. The figure was repeated by the BBC and the Hebrew news services by The New York Times on 13 April.

Eliahu Arbel, Operations Officer B of the Haganah's Etzioni Brigade, visited Deir Yassin on 10 April. "I have seen a great deal of war," he said years later, "but I never saw a sight like Deir Yassin."

The Arab side told de Reynier about the massacre in Deir Yassin and asked him to investigate. He was discouraged from visiting the village by Haganah and the Jewish Agency but insisted on going: "They advised me not to interfere, because if I were to go there, my mission might be ended. They washed their hands in advance of anything that might happen to me if I insisted. I answered that I would fulfill my duty and that I saw the Jewish Agency as directly responsible for my safety and freedom of action, because it is responsible for all territories under Jewish control."

==== 11 April ====
On the morning of 11 April, de Reynier visited Deir Yassin. He reported that he had encountered a "cleaning-up team" when he arrived at the village:

The gang [the Irgun detachment] was wearing country uniforms with helmets. All of them were young, some even adolescents, men and women, armed to the teeth: revolvers, machine-guns, hand grenades, and also cutlasses in their hands, most of them still blood-stained. A beautiful young girl, with criminal eyes, showed me hers still dripping with blood; she displayed it like a trophy. This was the "cleaning up" team, that was obviously performing its task very conscientiously.

I tried to go into a house. A dozen soldiers surrounded me, their machine-guns aimed at my body, and their officer forbade me to move ... I then flew into one of the most towering rages of my life, telling these criminals what I thought of their conduct, threatening them with everything I could think of, and then pushed them aside and went into the house

...I found some bodies, cold. Here the "cleaning up" had been done with machine-guns, then hand grenades. It had been finished off with knives, anyone could see that ... as I was about to leave, I heard something like a sigh. I looked everywhere, turned over all the bodies, and eventually found a little foot, still warm. It was a little girl of ten, mutilated by a hand grenade, but still alive ...

In his memoirs, published in 1950, de Reynier wrote:

a total of more than 200 dead, men, women, and children. About 150 cadavers have not been preserved inside the village in view of the danger represented by the bodies' decomposition. They have been gathered, transported some distance, and placed in a large trough (I have not been able to establish if this is a pit, a grain silo, or a large natural excavation). ... [One body was] a woman who must have been eight months pregnant, hit in the stomach, with powder burns on her dress indicating she'd been shot point-blank.

He also wrote that some of the 150 cadavers had been decapitated and disemboweled. After his inspection, the Irgun asked him to sign a document to say he had been received courteously and thanking them for their help. When he refused, they told him he would sign it if he valued his life. "The only course open to me was to convince them that I did not value my life in the least," he wrote. His assistant, Dr. Alfred Engel, wrote:

In the houses there were dead, in all about a hundred men, women and children. It was terrible. I did not see signs of mutilation or rape. It was clear that they had gone from house to house and shot the people at close range. I was a doctor in the German army for 5 years, in WWI, but I had not seen such a horrifying spectacle.

==== 12 April ====
By 12 April the Haganah had taken control of the village from the Irgun and Lehi. (Note: Hogan 2001 "By Monday, 12 April, the Haganah decided to take full control of Deir Yassin from the Irgun and Lehi.")

On 12 April before noon, two Jewish doctors, Tzvi Avigdori, the chairman of the Jerusalem branch of the Palestine Physicians Association, and his deputy, A. Druyan, visited Deir Yassin and reported:

The village was empty. Looted houses. The commanders of the Haganah showed us bodies in different places. A mother and her children that were killed by gunfire, two bodies of women who were killed by shooting. In the quarry five bodies [killed] by shooting, and two youths of 13 or 14 [killed] by shooting; in the Wadi 25 bodies, one over the other, uncovered, children and women. We did not check each body, all were dressed. Limbs were whole. There were no mutilations. They were not buried. There are no burial arrangements. Piles of smoking bodies. There were 12 bodies, and 6 burnt children. We asked for more bodies. Fifteen wounded and 15 bodies were transferred to Jerusalem by the Red Cross. There are other bodies in the houses. The Hagana commanders did not inspect the houses.

Later the same day, troops from Haganah's youth organization Gadna were ordered to the village. They were to relieve the revisionists but not before they had disposed of the bodies, something they had refused to do. The dispute almost lead to violence. Yeshurun Schiff who had accompanied the Gadna troops recalled: "I told the commander [of Etzel or Lehi], 'you are swine.' My people surrounded them. I spoke to Shaltiel by wireless. Shaltiel said, 'Take their weapons, and if they do not surrender their weapons, open fire.' I said, 'I cannot do that to Jews.' Shaltiel said 'That's an order!' but then he changed his mind." Eventually the revisionists left and the Gadna troops buried the bodies.

Gadna counsellor Hillel Polity related: "The stench was awful. They brought us gloves from the city, windbreakers and kerchiefs to cover our faces. We transported the bodies, two at a time, by hand, to the quarry. A bulldozer was brought from the city and used to cover the bodies with earth." Gadna commander Shoshana Shatai claimed she saw a woman with a great smashed belly: "I was in shock. On the following day I told the investigator what I had seen."

By the end of the operation all of the villagers had been expelled. (Note: Morris 2005 "The remaining villagers were then expelled.")

== Casualties and allegations of sexual violence ==
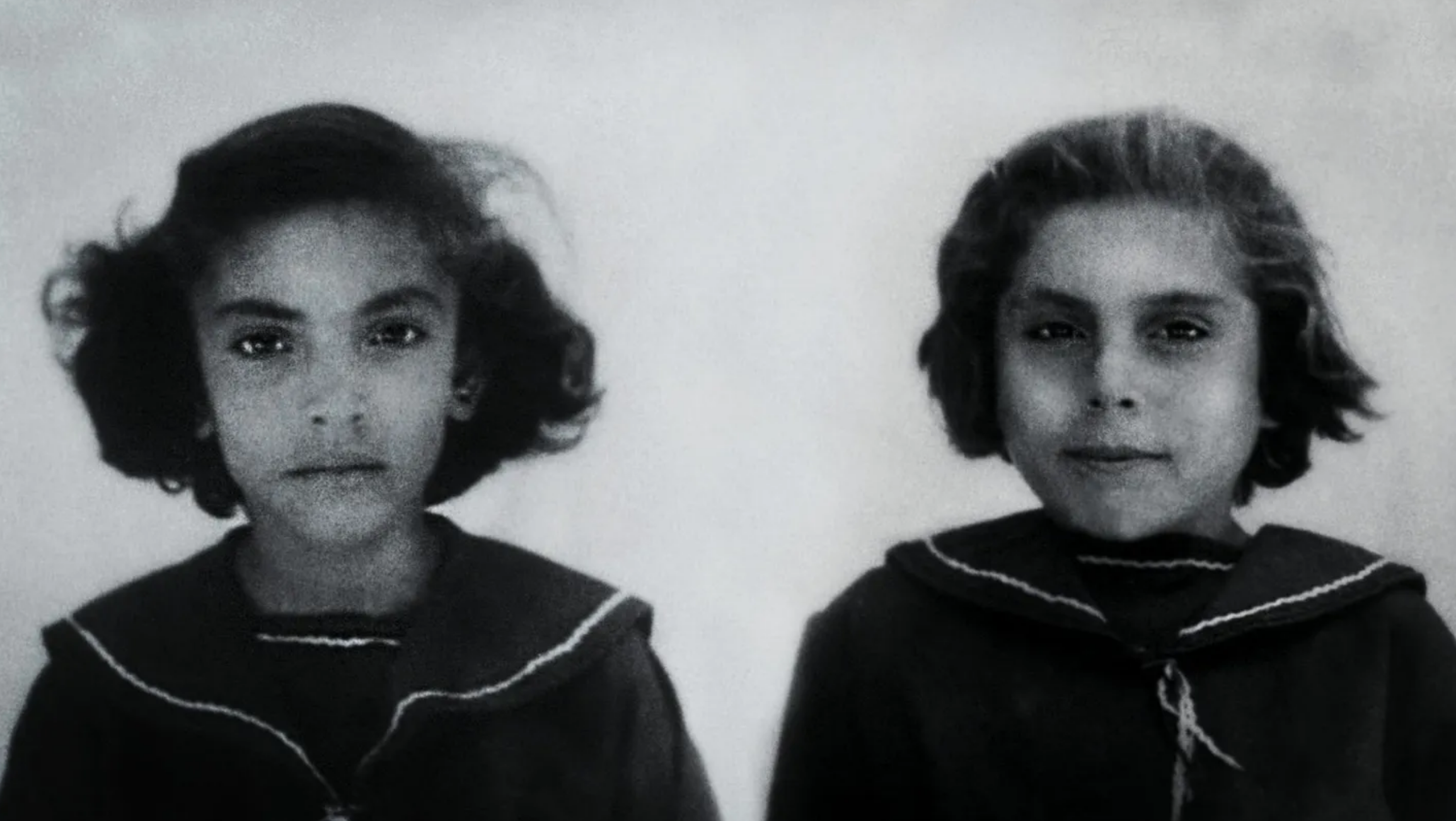
Picture of orphaned Palestinian girls whose parents were killed during the massacre

The exact number of victims killed is not known, although estimates range from 93 to 140. Historian Matthew Hogan estimates between 110 and 140 were killed, with 50 to 70 wounded. (Note: Hogan 2001, "The death toll from the massacre most likely fell between 110 and 140.) Benny Morris wrote that "altogether about 100–110 villagers died". Ilan Pappé estimated that 93 villagers were massacred and dozens of others were killed in the fighting. Sharif Kan'ana of Bir Zeit University interviewed survivors and published figures in 1988 concluding that 107 villagers had died, 11 of them armed, with 12 wounded. Palestinian historian Aref al-Aref estimated in 1956 that 117 had been killed — 7 in battle and 110 in their homes. (Note: Henry Laurens, La Question de Palestine (2007), vol.3, p.75 — "Dès 1956, 'Arif al-'Arif a fourni le chiffre de 117 morts: 7 au combat, 110 dans les maisons." (Translation: As early as 1956, 'Arif al-'Arif provided the figure of 117 dead: 7 in battle, 110 in the houses.)) Eliezer Tauber concluded that 101 villagers died. According to Tauber, of the dead 61 were killed in battle, of whom 24 were armed fighters and the rest were family members who were killed alongside them, 17 were killed in unknown circumstances, 12 were killed in circumstances that he considers to be in a "grey zone" in which the characterization of their deaths can be debated, and 11 were from a single family killed by an Irgun fighter.

Matthew Hogan writes that approximately two-thirds of the victims were women, children and elderly men. (Note: Hogan 2001, "About two-thirds of those killed were women, children, and men over 60") Hogan also stated that "The low number of Deir Yassin villager wounded (50-70) compared to the number killed (110-140), the reverse of ground combat's normal ratios, is also a noted trait of systematic killing".

For many decades the number of victims was believed to be around 250. Historian Ilan Pappé in The Ethnic Cleansing of Palestine (2006) writes that:

"Contemporary accounts put the number of victims of the Deir Yassin massacre at 254, a figure endorsed at the time by the Jewish Agency, a Red Cross official, The New York Times, and Dr Hussein al-Khalidi, spokesperson for the Jerusalem-based Arab Higher Committee. It is likely this figure was deliberately inflated in order to sow fear among the Palestinians and thereby panic them into a mass exodus."

=== Allegations of sexual violence ===
A number of sources alleged there had been instances of rape. Levi wrote on 13 April: "LHI members tell of the barbaric behavior of the IZL toward the prisoners and the dead. They also relate that the IZL men raped a number of Arab girls and murdered them afterward (we don't know if this is true)". Another source of rape allegations was Assistant Inspector-General Richard Catling of the British Palestine Police Force. He led a British police team that conducted interviews with survivors in Silwan on 13, 15, and 16 April:

On 14th April at 10 a.m. I visited Silwan village accompanied by a doctor and a nurse from the Government Hospital in Jerusalem and a member of the Arab Women's Union. We visited many houses in this village in which approximately some two to three hundred people from Deir Yassin village are housed. I interviewed many of the women folk in order to glean some information on any atrocities committed in Deir Yassin but the majority of those women are very shy and reluctant to relate their experiences especially in matters concerning sexual assault and they need great coaxing before they will divulge any information. The recording of statements is hampered also by the hysterical state of the women who often break down many times whilst the statement is being recorded. There is, however, no doubt that many sexual atrocities were committed by the attacking Jews. Many young schoolgirls were raped and later slaughtered. Old women were also molested. One story is current concerning a case in which a young girl was literally torn in two. Many infants were also butchered and killed. I also saw one old woman who gave her age as one hundred and four who had been severely beaten about the head with rifle butts. Women had bracelets torn from their arms and rings from their fingers and parts of some of the women's ears were severed in order to remove earrings.

Historian Abdel Jawad states that women at Deir Yassin spoke to British interrogators about rapes occurring and their opinion that this was the worst thing that happened. He states that it was something that could not be discussed in their society and was never talked of by the men. Citing Hasso (2000:495) Isabelle Humphries and Laleh Khalili note that in Palestine men's honour was tied to "the maintenance of kin women's virginity (when unmarried) or exclusive sexual availability (when married)", and that this culture led to the suppression of the narratives of rape victims. Hogan cites one documentary in which one female survivor nods affirmatively when asked about "molestation."

Gelber suggests that either the women's testimonies were a result of "the Arab propaganda machine" or that Catling was "an old and bitter enemy" of the Irgun and Lehi and fabricated the reports. The whereabouts of Catling's original reports are unknown, according to Gelber.

Gelber writes that the stories of rape angered the villagers, who complained to the Arab emergency committee that it was "sacrificing their honour and good name for propaganda purposes." Abu Mahmud, who lived in Deir Yassin in 1948, was one of those who complained. He told the BBC: "We said, 'There was no rape.' He [Hussayn Khalidi] said, 'We have to say this so the Arab armies will come to liberate Palestine from the Jews.'" "This was our biggest mistake," said Nusseibeh. "We did not realize how our people would react. As soon as they heard that women had been raped at Deir Yassin, Palestinians fled in terror. They ran away from all our villages." He told Larry Collins in 1968: "We committed a fatal error, and set the stage for the refugee problem."

A villager known as Haj Ayish claimed that "there had been no rape." He questioned the accuracy of the Arab radio broadcasts that "talked of women being killed and raped", and instead believed that "most of those who were killed were among the fighters and the women and children who helped the fighters." Mohammed Radwan, one of the villagers who fought the attackers, said: "There were no rapes. It's all lies. There were no pregnant women who were slit open. It was propaganda that ... Arabs put out so Arab armies would invade. They ended up expelling people from all of Palestine on the rumor of Deir Yassin." Radwan added "I know when I speak that God is up there and God knows the truth and God will not forgive the liars."

=== Number of attackers killed and injured ===
Yehuda Slutzky, a former Haganah officer, wrote in 1972 that four attackers were killed and 32 wounded, four of them seriously. Hogan in 2001 based on an Irgun communique from 11 April, put the death toll at five, four of whom were killed during the battle and one of whom later died of wounds sustained there. In addition, he wrote that four attackers were seriously wounded and 28 were "lightly wounded." Gelber in 2006 put the casualty toll of the attackers at five killed and 35 wounded. Morris, also in 2006, put the number of casualties at four killed and a dozen seriously wounded, adding that the figures of 30 to 40 wounded given by the attackers were likely exaggerated.

== Aftermath ==
=== Role in the 1948 Palestinian expulsion and flight ===
The attack on Deir Yassin spread great fear throughout the Palestinian Arab population, causing thousands more to flee from other locations, greatly accelerating the 1948 Palestinian expulsion and flight. (Note: Rogan 2012: "Palestinians had already begun fleeing the territory earlier in the spring. Between February and March 1948, some 75,000 Arabs had left their homes in the towns that were the center of fighting, such as Jerusalem, Jaffa, and Haifa, for the relative safety of the West Bank or neighboring Arab states. That April, after Dayr Yasin, the stream of refugees became a flood.") Historian Benny Morris wrote in The Birth of the Palestinian Refugee Problem (1988) that Deir Yassin "probably had the most lasting effect of any single event of the war in precipitating the flight of Arab villagers from Palestine." On 14 April, Irgun radio broadcast that villages around Deir Yassin and elsewhere were being evacuated. HIS intelligence reported that the residents of Beit Iksa and Al Maliha had fled. The village of Fureidis appealed for arms. The villages of Fajja and Mansura reached a peace agreement with their Jewish neighbors. A Haganah attack on the Arab village of Nasir al-Din near Tiberias on 12 April, only a few days after the Deir Yassin massacre, again saw villagers killed and expelled, leading some Palestinians to describe the attack as "a second Deir Yassin". (Note: Benny Morris, The Birth of the Palestinian Refugee Problem Revisited (2004), "The Arabs subsequently alleged that ‘there had been a second Deir Yassin’ in Nasir ad Din – and, indeed, some non-combatants, including women and children, were killed.") Arabs fled from Haifa and Khirbet Azzun. A Haganah attack on Saris encountered no resistance, because of the fear of Deir Yassin, in the view of the British.

Irgun commander Ben-Zion Cohen, who participated in the attack, later stated that: "If there were another three or four more Deir Yassins in the Land of Israel at the time, not a single Arab would have remained in Israel".

Menachem Begin, leader of the Irgun at the time of the attack, denied that a massacre occurred and blamed "enemy propaganda" for causing the Palestinians' fears and flight, stating in 1977 that "Not what happened at Dir Yassin, but what was invented about Dir Yassin, helped to carve the way to our decisive victories on the battlefield", and that "the legend was worth half a dozen battalions to the forces of Israel." (Note: Morris 2004, "Begin, who denied that civilians had been massacred, later recalled that the ‘Arab propaganda’ campaign had sowed fear among the Arabs and ‘the legend was worth half a dozen battalions to the forces of Israel . . . Panic overwhelmed the Arabs of Eretz Yisrael ... [It] helped us in particular in ... Tiberias and the conquest of Haifa.’") Begin described the effects of the Deir Yassin massacre as follows:

Panic overwhelmed the Arabs of Eretz Israel. Kolonia village, which had previously repulsed every attack of the Haganah, was evacuated overnight and fell without further fighting. Beit-Iksa was also evacuated. [...] In the rest of the country, too, the Arabs began to flee in terror, even before they clashed with Jewish forces. [...] The legend of Dir Yassin helped us in particular in the saving of Tiberias and the conquest of Haifa.

Other anti-Arab massacres and ethnic cleansing operations followed Deir Yassin, including the Dawayima massacre, Lydda massacre, Safsaf massacre, fall of Haifa, and the Sasa massacre, among others, (Note: Benny Morris, Making Israel (2007) "Jewish atrocities—far more widespread than the Old Historians have indicated (there were massacres of Arabs at Dawayima, Eilabun, Jish, Safsaf, Hula, Saliha, and Sasa besides Deir Yassin and Lydda)—and the drive to avenge past Arab misdeeds also contributed significantly to the exodus.") with Mapam's leaders later concluding that the attacks on Deir Yassin and Haifa were the two pivotal events of the Palestinian exodus.

=== 1948 Arab–Israeli war ===
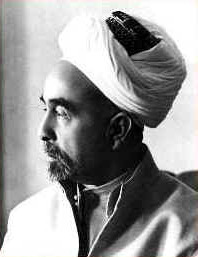
Abdullah I of Jordan said Deir Yassin had changed things, and that invasion was now unavoidable.

The Deir Yassin attack, along with attacks on Tiberias, Haifa, and Jaffa aroused public anger in the Arab world, which put pressure on Arab governments to invade Palestine. Egyptian King Faruq was influenced by Deir Yassin (Note: Sana Hammoudi, The Deir Yasin Massacre, 9 April 1948: An Ominous Sign of Worse to Come "However, the massacre did remove King Faruq's hesitancy when, on 12 April, he informed Arab leaders that Egypt would join the Arab armies in defending Palestine with the expected British evacuation of the country on 15 May.") and Syria's foreign minister remarked that the Arab public's desire for war was irresistible. Azzam Pasha, Secretary General of the Arab League, stated that "The massacre of Deir Yassin was to a great extent the cause of the wrath of the Arab nations and the most important factor for sending [in] the Arab armies".

The arrival of tens of thousands of refugees further convinced them to act. A consensus favoring invasion began to emerge the day after Deir Yassin, at a meeting on 10 April in Cairo of the Arab League Political Committee. According to historian Benny Morris, "Deir Yassin alienated peace-prone Arab leaders, such as King Abdullah of Jordan, making it difficult for them to continue their dialogue with the Yishuv." Golda Meir, disguised in an Arab robe, met King Abdullah in Amman on 10–11 May, the second such meeting between them. During their first, Abdullah had agreed to a partition of Palestine to include a Jewish state. Now, he retracted, suggesting instead a Jewish canton within a Hashemite kingdom. Deir Yassin had changed things, he said. Meir reported later that Abdullah was approaching war "not out of joy or confidence, but as a person who is in a trap and can't get out." (Note: Benny Morris, 1948: A History of the First Arab-Israeli War (2008): "Meir countered that back in November, they had agreed on a partition with Jewish statehood. Why not abide by the agreement? Abdullah replied that the situation had changed. There had been Deir Yassin, and he was now only one of a coalition of five war-bound Arab rulers, no longer a free agent. "He is going to this business [that is, war] not out of joy or confidence, but as a person who is in a trap and can't get out," Meir later explained.")

=== Hadassah medical convoy massacre ===
On 13 April, five days after Deir Yassin, Arab forces carried out the Hadassah medical convoy massacre as a form of retaliation. (Note: Rogan 2012: "Some Palestinians chose to fight horror with horror. Four days after the massacre at Dayr Yasin, on 13 April, Palestinian fighters ambushed a Jewish medical convoy heading to Mount Scopus on the edge of Jerusalem. The two ambulances were clearly marked with medical insignia, and the passengers were in fact doctors and nurses of the Hadassah Hospital and employees of the Hebrew University. There were 112 passengers in the convoy. Only 36 survived.")

=== Reactions ===
Stamps issued to commemorate the Deir Yassin massacre

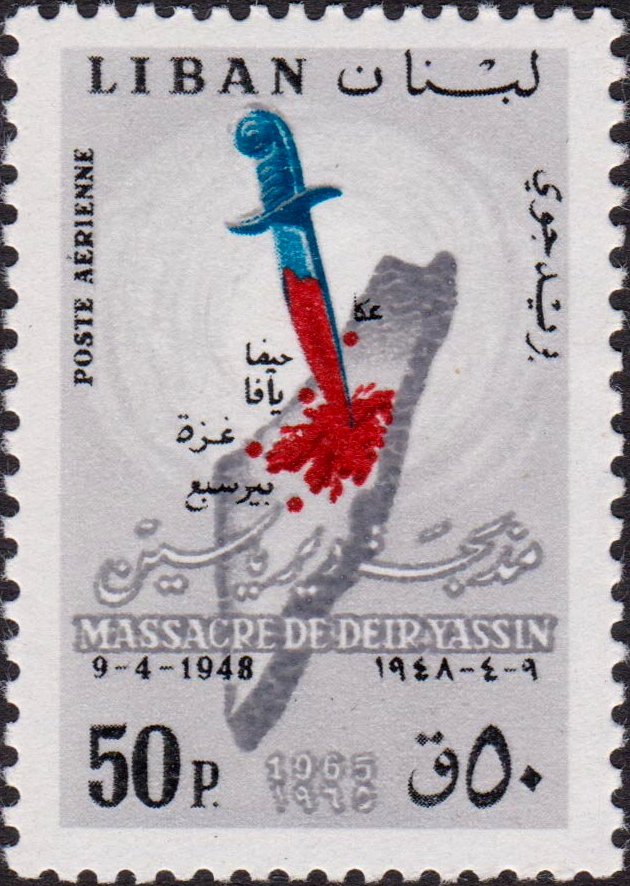
Lebanon

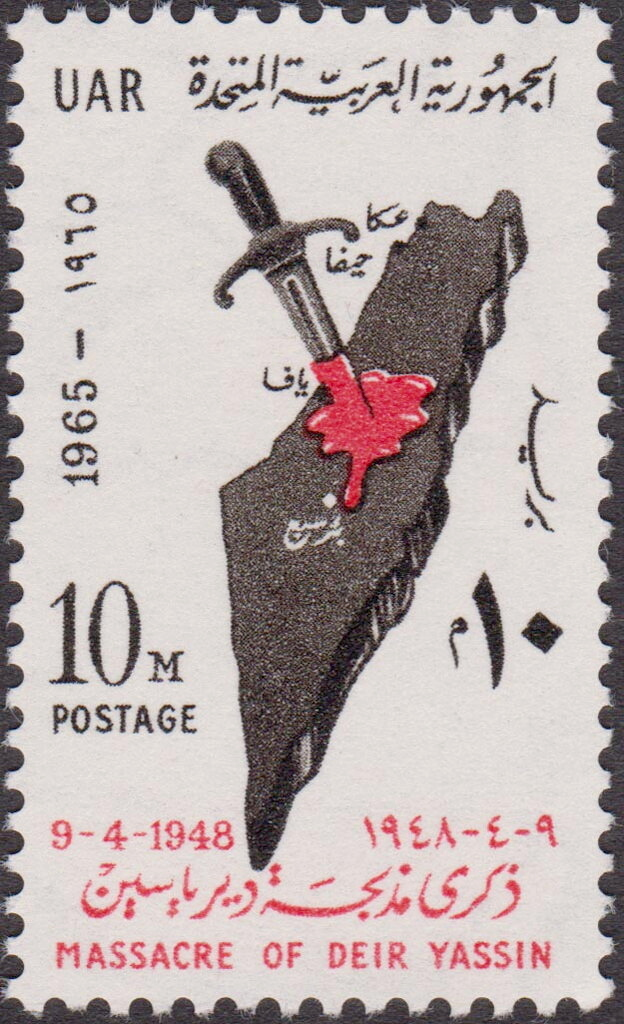
Egypt (UAR)

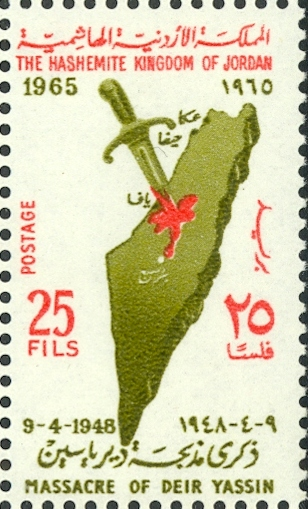
Jordan

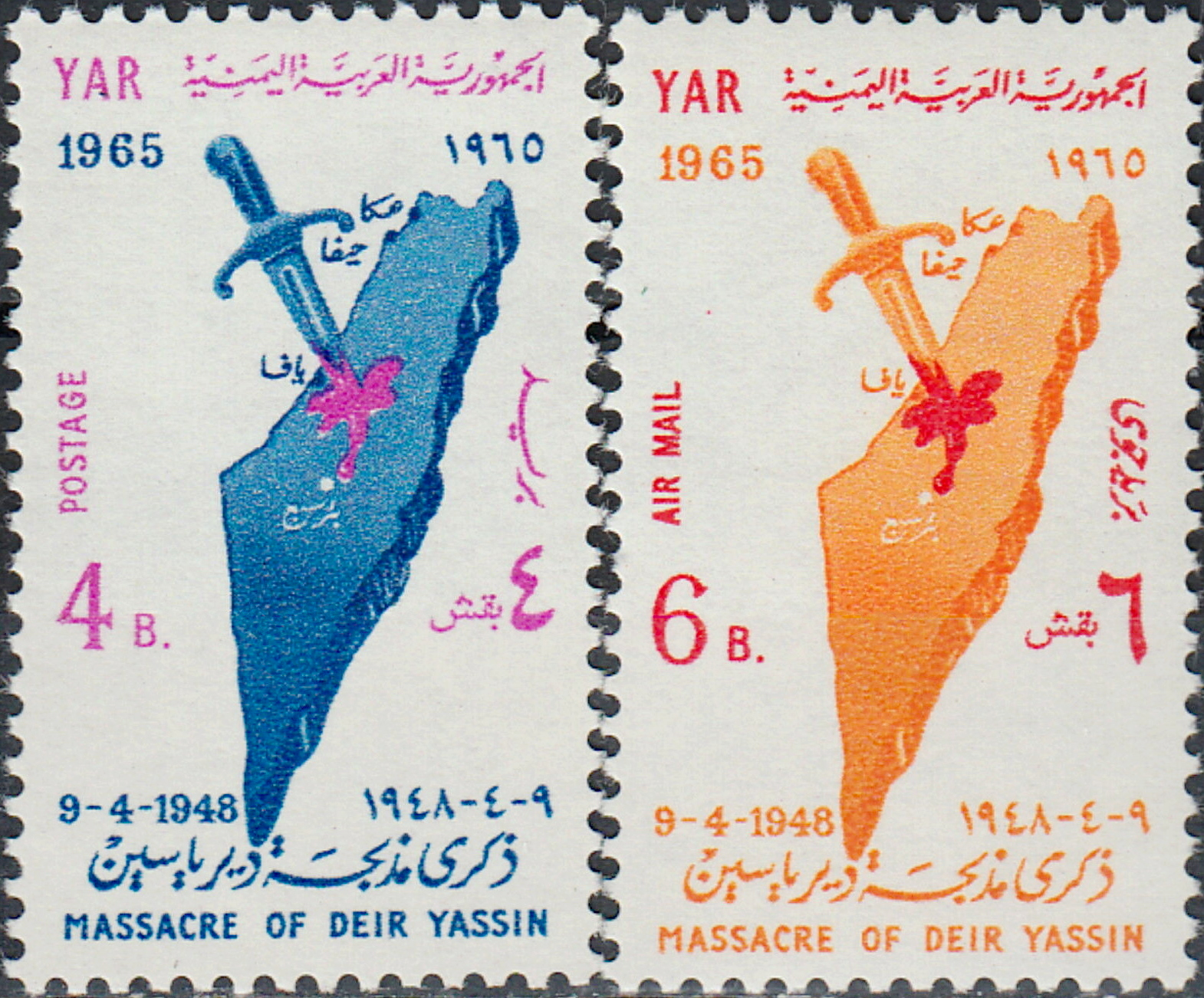
North Yemen

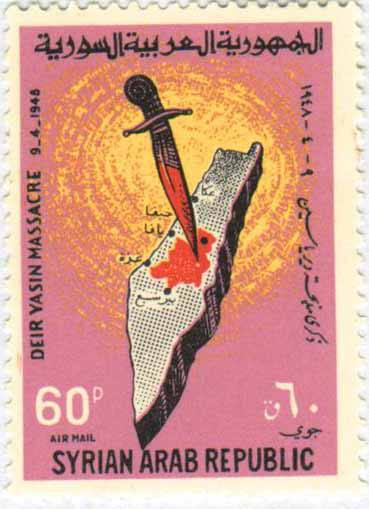
Syria

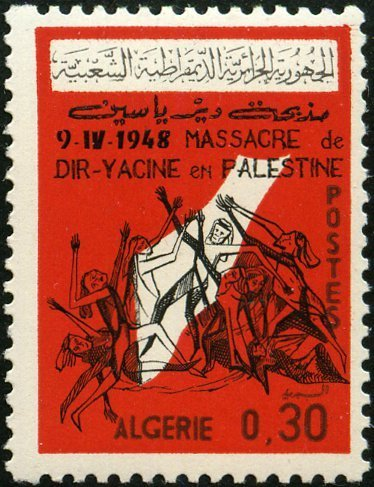
1966 Algeria

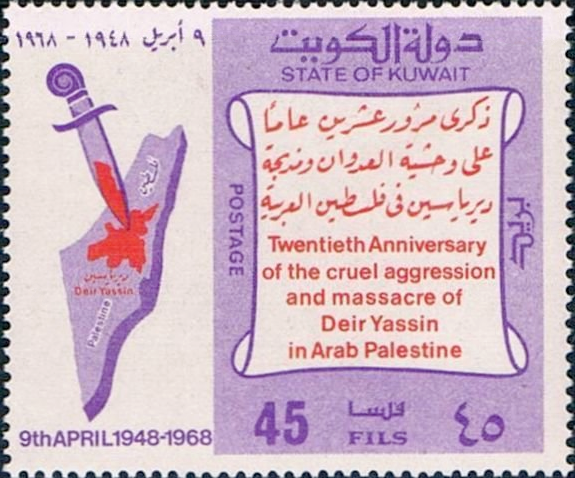
1968 Kuwait

Issued in 1965 (top two rows), 1966, and 1968

The Haganah denied its role in the attack and publicly condemned the massacre, blaming it on the Irgun and Lehi. The Jewish Agency for Palestine (which controlled the Haganah), sent Jordan's King Abdullah a letter of apology, which Abdullah rejected, stating "the Jewish Agency stands at the head of all Jewish affairs in Palestine." (Note: Benny Morris, 1948: A History of the First Arab-Israeli War (2008), "The atrocities were condemned by the Jewish Agency, the Haganah command, and the Yishuv's two chief rabbis, and the agency sent King Abdullah a letter condemning the atrocities and apologizing (which he rebuffed, saying that "the Jewish Agency stands at the head of all Jewish affairs in Palestine").")

Menachem Begin, leader of the Irgun, who would go on to become Prime Minister of Israel in 1977, (Note: Marc H. Ellis, Remembering Deir Yassin: A Reflection on Memory and Justice: "Among the perpetrators of the massacre was the Irgun, a radical military arm in the struggle for the establishment of a Jewish state, whose leader, Menachem Begin, would later become prime minister of Israel.") hailed the taking of Deir Yassin as a "splendid act of conquest" that would serve as a model for the future. In a note to his commanders he wrote: "Tell the soldiers: you have made history in Israel with your attack and your conquest. Continue thus until victory. As in Deir Yassin, so everywhere, we will attack and smite the enemy. God, God, Thou has chosen us for conquest." Morris writes that "During the following decades, Menachem Begin’s Herut Party and its successor, the Likud, were continually berated for Deir Yassin in internal Israeli political squabbling."

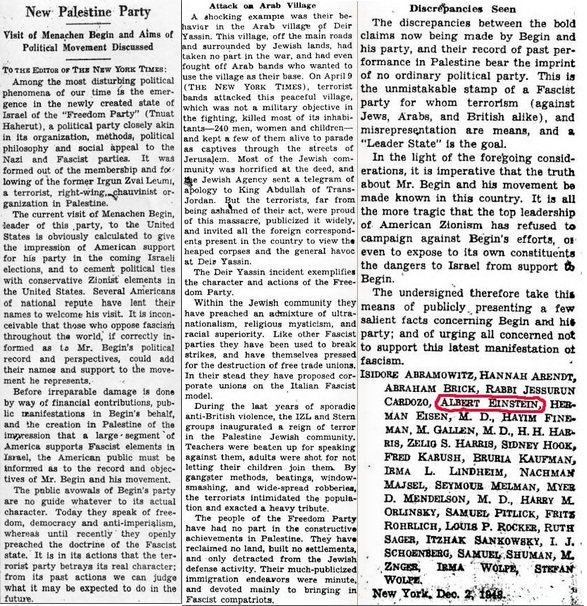
Letter written to the New York Times condemning Begin and the Deir Yassin massacre, published Dec 4, 1948. The signature of Albert Einstein is highlighted.

On Dec 4, 1948, The New York Times published an open letter condemning Begin, the Irgun and the Israeli Freedom Party, describing the latter as "a political party closely akin in its organization, methods, political philosophy and social appeal to the Nazi and Fascist parties." The letter stated that "The Deir Yassin incident exemplifies the character and actions of the Freedom Party." The Irgun was characterized as "a terrorist, right-wing, chauvinist organization." Albert Einstein and Hannah Arendt were among the letter's signatories.

The Jordanian newspaper Al Urdun published a survivor's account in 1955, which said the Palestinians had deliberately exaggerated stories about atrocities in Deir Yassin to encourage others to fight, stories that had caused them to flee instead. Every group in Palestine had cause for spreading the atrocity narrative. The Irgun and Lehi wished to frighten the Arabs into leaving Palestine; the Arabs wished to provoke an international response; the Haganah wished to tarnish the Irgun and Lehi; and the Arabs wished to malign both the Jews and their cause. Gelber writes that Husayin al-Khalidi, the deputy chairman of the Higher Arab Executive in Jerusalem told journalists on 12 April that the village's dead included 25 pregnant women, 52 mothers of babies, and 60 girls. Historian Uri Milstein writes that the left-wing Mapai party and David Ben-Gurion, who became Israel's first prime minister on 14 May, exploited Deir Yassin to stop a power-sharing agreement with the right-wing Revisionists—who were associated with Irgun and Lehi—a proposal that was being debated at the time in Tel Aviv.

In 1968, Israel Eldad stated that "Had it not been for Deir Yasin, half a million Arabs would be living in the state of Israel. The state of Israel would not have existed."

=== Resettlement as Givat Shaul Bet ===
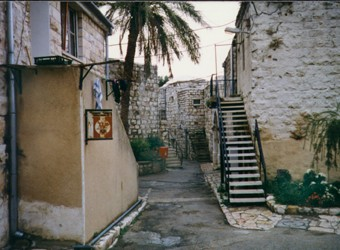
Remains of the village inside the Kfar Shaul Mental Health Center.

In 1949, despite protests, the Jerusalem neighborhood of Givat Shaul Bet was built on what had been Deir Yassin's land, now considered part of Har Nof, an Orthodox area. Historian Tom Segev writes that "Several hundred guests came to the opening ceremony, including the Ministers Kaplan and Shapira, as well as the Chief Rabbis and the Mayor of Jerusalem. President Haim Weizmann sent written congratulations".

Four Jewish scholars, Martin Buber, Ernst Simon, Werner Senator, and Cecil Roth, wrote a letter to Israel's first prime minister, David Ben-Gurion, asking that Deir Yassin be left uninhabited, or that its settlement be postponed. Writing that "The Deir Yassin affair is a black stain on the honor of the Jewish nation", and that it had become "infamous throughout the Jewish world, the Arab world and the whole world", they argued that "resettling Deir Yassin within a year of the crime, and within the framework of ordinary settlement, would amount to an endorsement of, or at least an acquiescence with, the massacre." Ben-Gurion failed to respond, though the correspondents sent him copy after copy. Eventually, his secretary replied that he had been too busy to read their letter.

In 1951, the Kfar Shaul Mental Health Center was built on the village itself, using some of the village's abandoned buildings. Currently, many of the remaining buildings, located within the hospital, are hidden behind the hospital's fence, with entry closely restricted. In the 1980s, most of the remaining abandoned parts of the village were bulldozed to make way for new neighborhoods, and most of the Deir Yassin cemetery was bulldozed to make way for a highway. Har HaMenuchot, a Jewish cemetery, lies to the north. To the south is a valley containing part of the Jerusalem Forest, and on the other side of the valley, a mile and a half away, lie Mount Herzl and the Holocaust memorial museum, Yad Vashem. There are no memorials or indicators of the Deir Yassin massacre at the site today. (Note: Phyllis Bennis, Dayr Yasin Remembered, Middle East Report 207 (Summer 1998): "There are no markers or plaques indicating the site of Dayr Yasin".) Palestinian historian Walid Khalidi wrote in 1992:

Many of the village houses on the hill are still standing and have been incorporated into an Israeli hospital for the mentally ill that was established on the site. Some houses outside the fence of the hospital grounds are used for residential and commercial purposes, or as warehouses. Outside the fence, there are carob and almond trees and the stumps of olive trees. Several wells are located at the southwestern edge of the site. The old village cemetery, southeast of the site, is unkempt and threatened by debris from a ring road that has been constructed around the village hill. One tall cypress tree still stands at the center of the cemetery.

=== 1999 Motion in UK Parliament ===
On 8 December 1999, Jeremy Corbyn put forward a motion to the Parliament of the United Kingdom:

"That this House remembers the 1948 massacre at the Palestinian village of Deir Yassin; acknowledges the great significance of this tragic event for Palestinians since it marked the beginning of the depopulation of over 400 Arab villages and cities and the expulsion of over 700,000 Palestinians; and therefore calls on Her Majesty's Government to make representations to the Israeli Government, to permit, as a gracious act of reconciliation and mutual recognition, the building of a memorial at the site of the massacre".

Between then and May 2000, 29 other members signed the motion Audrey Wise, initially signed the motion but then withdrew her support.

=== Veterans benefits suit ===
In 1952 a group of four wounded Irgun and Lehi fighters applied to the Israeli Defense Ministry for veterans' benefits. The Ministry rejected their application stating that the Deir Yassin massacre wasn't "military service". But the decision was reversed after the group appealed.

== Historiography ==
According to New Historian Benny Morris, "Arab chroniclers and historians by and large related, and continue to relate, to Deir Yassin as representative of Yishuv/Israeli military behavior in 1948, not as an exception; Deir Yassin, for them, is the paradigm for the Nakba as a whole. The implication is that massacres accompanied or followed the conquest of all or most Arab sites. This is the thrust of [Walid] Khalidi’s (and, incidentally, Milstein's) assertion that Deir Yassin was far from unique and merely conformed to the pattern of Haganah conquests during the war."

=== Denialism ===
Benny Morris wrote in 2005 that "Veterans of the IZL subsequently denied that a massacre had taken place, and they have recently been supported by Israeli historian Uri Milstein and American Zionist leader Morton Klein, who wrote a pamphlet on Deir Yassin based largely on Milstein’s work." Morris writes that "The main point, of course, related to whether or not there had been a massacre at all" and that "this dispute [...] is partly obscured or caused by unstated semantic differences over what constitutes a "massacre"", and Pappé argues that "as the Jewish forces regarded any Palestinian village as an enemy military base, the distinction between massacring people and killing them 'in battle' was slight."

In 1969, the Israeli Foreign Ministry published an English pamphlet "Background Notes on Current Themes: Deir Yassin" denying that there had been a massacre at Deir Yassin, that the village was the home of an Iraqi garrison, and calling the massacre story "part of a package of fairy tales, for export and home consumption". The pamphlet led to a series of derivative articles giving the same message, mostly outside Israel. Menachem Begin's Herut party disseminated a Hebrew translation in Israel, causing a widespread but largely non-public debate within the Israeli establishment.

Several former leaders of the Haganah demanded that the pamphlet be withdrawn on account of its inaccuracy, but the Foreign Ministry explained that "While our intention and desire is to maintain accuracy in our information, we sometimes are forced to deviate from this principle when we have no choice or alternative means to rebuff a propaganda assault or Arab psychological warfare." Levi wrote to Begin: "On behalf of the truth and the purity of arms of the Jewish soldier in the War of Independence, I see it as my duty to warn you against continuing to spread this untrue version about what happened in Deir Yassin to the Israeli public. Otherwise there will be no avoiding raising the matter publicly and you will be responsible." Eventually, the Foreign Ministry agreed to stop distributing the pamphlet, but it remains the source of many popular accounts.

Eliezer Tauber of Bar-Ilan University published a book in 2021 titled The Massacre That Never Was, arguing that what occurred at Deir Yassin was a battle and not a massacre.

=== First hand accounts ===
Due to the lack of technical evidence, historians' narratives of the Deir Yassin massacre are largely based on witness accounts, either in the form of reports produced before or shortly after the attack, or in interviews conducted many years later.

- Non-participants:
  - Jacques de Reynier, head of the International Committee of the Red Cross delegation in Palestine who had been staying in the country since early April. He visited Deir Yassin on 11 April and reported what he saw on 13 April.
- Survivors:
  - Fahimi Zeidan, a 12-year-old girl, testified in 1987.
  - Mohamed Aref Samir (also spelled Muhammad Arif Sammour), schoolteacher in Deir Yassin and later education official in Jordan. (Note: Eric Silver, Begin: The Haunted Prophet - "To Muhammad Arif Sammour, the victims were not just anonymous Arabs. They were cousins, neighbours, friends. The young teacher watched the slaughter from his house high up on the far side of Deir Yassin until about four p.m. when he managed to escape to Ein Karem [...] a couple of miles to the west.)
- Haganah personnel:
  - Meir Pa'il, intelligence officer with the Palmach, who spied on Irgun and Lehi. After the war he became a politician and historian. Reported extensively on what he saw at Deir Yassin.
  - Yitzhak Levi, head of the Haganah intelligence agency Shai in Jerusalem. He published his memoirs Nine Measures in 1986.
  - Mordechai Gichon, Haganah intelligence officer sent to Deir Yassin when the battle ended.
  - Yair Tsaban, member of the Gadna (Youth Brigades) who participated in burying bodies.
  - Yehoshua Arieli, Gadna crew leader.
  - Zvi Ankori, Gadna commander.
- Irgun fighters:
  - Mordechai Raanan (Mordechai Kaufman), Irgun district commander in Jerusalem.
  - Yehoshua Gorodenchik, Irgun physician whose testimony was given to the Jabotinsky archives following the war.
  - Yehuda Lapidot, second-in-command in the attack on Deir Yassin. After the war he became an academic and in 1992 he published his memoir Besieged Jerusalem 1948: memories of an Irgun fighter. In his memoirs he claimed that, in the view of Irgun and Lehi, Deir Yassin posed a threat to Jewish neighborhoods and the main road to the coastal plain. He further claimed that an assault on the village would show the Arabs that the Jews intended to fight for Jerusalem. In earlier testimony he had claimed that "the reason was mainly economic", "to capture booty" to supply Irgun and Lehi's bases with. Lapidot in his memoirs writes that there had been occasional skirmishes between Deir Yassin and Givat Shaul residents, and that on 3 April shots had been fired from Deir Yassin toward the Jewish villages of Bet Hakerem and Yefe Nof. He also claimed that Deir Yassin was defended by 100 armed men, that ditches had been dug around it, that Iraqi and Palestinian guerrillas were stationed there, and that there was a guard force stationed by the village entrance.
- Lehi fighters:
  - Yehoshua Zettler.
  - Yehuda Feder, "Giora".
  - Ezra Yachin.

=== Archival records ===
Material in Israeli military archives documenting the Deir Yassin massacre remains classified. These records include an eyewitness report from Meir Pa'il and two rolls of photographs taken by the photographer who accompanied him. In 1999, the organization Deir Yassin Remembered asked Prime Minister Ehud Barak to release the records. In 2010, the Supreme Court of Israel rejected a petition by the newspaper Haaretz for the declassification of documents, reports and photographs concerning the Deir Yassin massacre. The court cited the possible damage to Israel's foreign relations and its negotiations with the Palestinians. This view was reaffirmed when Israeli researcher Rona Sela attempted to examine the material in the mid-2010s. The Israeli state archivist replied that:

'A special committee (headed by the Minister of Justice Ayelet Shaked) to deal with permission to view classified archival material met on 11 September 2016, to discuss among others, your request. The committee asked for clarifications from additional sources and concluded that until they receive these answers and have further discussions on the subject, the material will remain classified.'

=== Milstein Pa'il controversy ===
Israeli military historian Uri Milstein alleged in 1998 that Meir Pa'il was not in Deir Yassin on 9 April. Milstein said there were contradictions in Pa'il's claims and an absence of any mention of Pa'il in other Haganah accounts of the incident. All Irgun and Lehi veterans Milstein interviewed denied having seen Pa'il in Deir Yassin, and the Lehi intelligence officer who Pa'il claimed invited him to Deir Yassin denied having done so. In addition, Haganah members who were in the area (including the deputy commander of the Palmach force that took part in the attack), some of whom personally knew Pa'il and were specifically mentioned in his account, denied having seen him there. According to Milstein, Pa'il said he despised the "dissidents", thus giving him a political motive to submit a falsified report. Milstein also wrote that Haganah intelligence reports on the incident were doctored by the authors or their superiors to discredit the Irgun and Lehi because of political in-fighting within the Jewish community.

Morris challenges Milstein's version that Pa'il was not at Deir Yassin that day with his observation that part of Pa'il's report, that he saw the bodies of five Arabs in a quarry, "is apparently reinforced by a report by two Jewish doctors, who also report having found five male bodies in a house by the village quarry". In a presentation to the PEACE Middle East Dialog Group, Ami Isseroff, translator of Milstein's book into English, provided side-notes critical of many aspects of Milstein's work, including much of his information about Pa'il and also about the incompleteness of his sources – "Both Milstein and Yitzhak Levi leave out key testimony by Yehoshua Gorodenchik, from the Jabotinsky archives, in which he admits that Irgun troops murdered about 80 prisoners – mostly men – corresponding to accounts of refugees".

Pa'il, who died in 2015, defended himself in an interview in 2007: "What the Lehi and Etzel [Irgun] people did in Deir Yassin in April 1948 was a despicable act. It cannot be called by any other name." He maintained that he was sent to Deir Yassin to gauge Lehi and Irgun's fighting capabilities which he found to be lacking: "they didn't know a thing about field war. Worse, I saw that they knew how to massacre and kill... They are angry with me that I said these things. Let them first be angry at themselves." He also attacked Milstein for being "a cheap propagandist for the right-wing considerations of the Zionist enterprise," adding angrily: "I was there, I saw the massacre with my own eyes. Why didn't he ever question me about the things I experienced there?"

== See also ==
- Depopulated Palestinian locations in Israel
- Israeli war crimes
- Killings and massacres during the 1948 Palestine War
- List of killings and massacres in Mandatory Palestine

== Endnotes ==
=== References ===
- Banks, Lynne Reid (1982). A Torn Country: An Oral History of the Israeli War of Independence. New York: Franklin Watts.
- BBC and PBS (1998). "The Arab Israeli Conflict – part 2 : Israeli massacres 1948" Archived 15 October 2016 at the Wayback Machine, The Fifty Years War, accessed 12 August 2010.
- Begin, Menachem (1977), The Revolt (1977 ed.), Dell Publishing
- Collins, Larry; Lapierre, Dominique (1972), O Jerusalem!, Simon and Schuster
- Dayan, Linda (11 May 2025). "At the 'apolitical' Lehi Museum, Israel's most controversial pre-state militia lives on". Haaretz.
- Eban, Abba (1969). Background Notes on Current Themes – No.6: Dir Yassin. Jerusalem: Ministry for Foreign Affairs, Information Division, 16 March 1969.
- Ellis, Marc H. (1999). O, Jerusalem!: the contested future of the Jewish covenant. Fortress Press. ISBN 0-8006-3159-5, 978-0-8006-3159-8
- Franzman, Seth J. (3 April 2014). "Begin's enduring odyssey". The Jerusalem Post (JPost.com).
- Gelber, Yoav (2006), "Propaganda as History: What Happened at Deir Yassin?" (PDF), Palestine 1948, Sussex Academic Press, archived from the original (PDF) on 27 February 2008
- Hirst, David (2003), The Gun and the Olive Branch (2003 ed.), Faber and Faber (first published 1977).
- Hogan, Matthew (2001). "The 1948 Massacre at Deir Yassin Revisited". The Historian. 63 (2). Wiley: 309–333. ISSN 0018-2370. JSTOR 24450239.
- Holmes, Paul (1998) for Reuters, published in the Middle East Times, 20 April 1998, cited in Comay, Naomi. Arabs speak frankly on the Arab-Israeli conflict. Printing Miracles Limited, 2005, p. 16.
- Kagan, Binyamin (1966). The Secret Battle for Israel. The World Publishing Co.
- Kananah, Sharif and Zaytuni, Nihad (1988). Deir Yassin القرى الفلسطينية المدمرة (Destroyed Palestinian Villages), Birzeit University Press.
- Khalidi, Walid (1992). All That Remains: The Palestinian Villages Occupied and Depopulated by Israel in 1948. Institute for Palestine Studies.
- LaGuardia, Anton (2003). War Without End: Israelis, Palestinians, and the Struggle for a Promised Land. St. Martin's Griffin.
- Lapidot, Yehuda (1992), Besieged, Jerusalem 1948: Memories of an Irgun Fighter, archived from the original on 19 September 2021. See part II: Jerusalem, for "the section on Deir Yassin". daat.ac.il. Archived from the original on 25 November 2021.
- Levi, Yitzhak (1986). Nine Measures (in Hebrew). Maarachot.
- Levin, Harry (1950). I Saw the Battle of Jerusalem. Schocken Books.
- Lorch, Netanel (1981). The Edge of the Sword. Easton Press.
- Madsen, Ann Nicholls (2003). Making Their Own Peace: Twelve Women of Jerusalem. Lantern Books.
- Martin, Ralph G (1982). Golda: Golda Meir – The Romantic Years. New York: Charles Scribner's Sons.
- Meltzer, Julian Louis (1948). "Jerusalem truce halts Israeli push to retake old city" Archived 23 July 2018 at the Wayback Machine, The New York Times, 18 July 1948.
- McGowan, Daniel and Ellis, Marc. (eds.) (1998). Remembering Deir Yassin: The Future of Israel and Palestine. Interlink Publishing Group.
- Milstein, Uri (1998). History of Israel's War of Independence: Out of Crisis Came Decision. Vol. 4. University Press of America.
- Milstein, Uri (1991). History of Israel's War of Independence: Out of Crisis Came Decision. Vol. 4. Translated by Ami Isseroff. Zmora-Bitan.
- Milstein, Uri (1970). Genesis 1948. The New American Library.
- Morris, Benny (1 October 2008). 1948: A History of the First Arab-Israeli War. Yale University Press. ISBN 978-0-300-14524-3. Archived from the original on 20 March 2023.
- Morris, Benny (2005). "The Historiography of Deir Yassin". Journal of Israeli History. 24 (1). Informa UK Limited: 79–107. doi:10.1080/13531040500040305. ISSN 1353-1042. S2CID 159894369.
- Morris, Benny (2004). The Birth of the Palestinian Refugee Problem Revisited. Cambridge University Press.
- Morris, Benny (2001). Righteous Victims: A History of the Zionist-Arab Conflict, 1881–2001. Vintage Books.
- Morris, Benny (1987). The Birth of the Palestinian Refugee Problem, 1947–1949. Cambridge University Press. ISBN 9780521330282.
- Pa'il, Meir and Isseroff, Ami (1998). "Meir Pail's Eyewitness Account", 1 October 1998, accessed 18 November 2010.
- Pappé, Ilan (2006). The Ethnic Cleansing of Palestine. Oneworld Publications. ISBN 9781851684670 – via archive.org. Wikipedia page: The Ethnic Cleansing of Palestine
- Reynier, Jacques de (1950). A Jerusalem un Drapeau flottait sur la Ligne de Feu. Neuchâtel: Editions de la Baconnière.
- Rodinson, Maxime (1968), Israel and the Arabs, Penguin Books
- Schmidt, Dana Adams (1948). 200 Arabs killed, stronghold taken Archived 23 July 2018 at the Wayback Machine, The New York Times, 9 April 1948.
- Segev, Tom (1998). 1949: The First Israelis. Holt Paperbacks.
- Shaltiel, David (1981). Jerusalem 1948 (in Hebrew). Tel Aviv.
- Silver, Eric (1984). Begin: A Biography.
  - Sheleg, Yair [in Hebrew] (7 April 2007). "The Good Jailer". haaretz.com Haaretz (English ed.). Israel.
  - Hebrew version: שלג, יאיר [in Hebrew] (7 April 2007). הסוהר הטוב. haaretz.co.il הארץ (in Hebrew). Israel. Archived from the original on 25 December 2024.
- Silver, Eric (2 April 1998), "Arab witnesses admit exaggerating Deir Yassin massacre", The Jerusalem Report, archived from the original on 2 November 2012

=== Further reading ===
  - "Articles to commemorate the 50th anniversary". Al Hayat (in Arabic). April 1998 – via deiryassin.org and Wayback Machine.
  - "9 April" (PDF). p. 18. Archived from the original (PDF) on 18 February 2010.
  - "9 April" (PDF). p. 19. Archived from the original (PDF) on 18 February 2010.
  - "12 April" (PDF). Archived from the original (PDF) on 18 February 2010.
  - "13 April" (PDF). Archived from the original (PDF) on 20 March 2003.
  - "14 April" (PDF). Archived from the original (PDF) on 18 February 2010.
  - "15 April" (PDF). Archived from the original (PDF) on 18 February 2010.
  - Accessed 15 April 2011.
- Al-Arif, Arif (1956), Al-Nakba, Beirut
- Avner, Yehuda (7 April 2007), "The Ghosts of Deir Yassin", The Jerusalem Post, archived from the original on 19 September 2020
- "Deir Yassin Remembered", Deir Yassin Remembered, archived from the original on 20 February 2009 – via web.archive.org video showing scenes of the village remains and its cemetery
- Hasso, Frances S. (2000). "Modernity and Gender in Arab Accounts of the 1948 and 1967 Defeats". International Journal of Middle East Studies. 32 (4): 491–510. doi:10.1017/S0020743800021188.
- Lapidot, Yehuda, "Deir Yassin", IZL (Irgun) website, archived from the original on 25 June 2003
- Laurens, Henry (2007), La Question de Palestine, vol. 3, Paris: Fayard
- Lockman, Zachary (1996). Comrades and Enemies; Arab and Jewish Workers in Palestine, 1906 – 1948. University of California Press. ISBN 9780520204195.
- Masalha, Nur (1988). "On Recent Hebrew and Israeli Sources for the Palestinian Exodus, 1947–49". Journal of Palestine Studies Vol. 18, No. 1, Special Issue: "Palestine 1948", Autumn, 1988: 121–137. Archived from the original on 31 March 2016.
- Milstein, Uri (2007), Blood Libel at Deir Yassin: The Black Book עלילת דם בדיר יאסין – הספר השחור, National Midrasha Publishers and Survival Institute Publishers
- Milstein, Uri (1989), תולדות מחלמת העצמאות [History of the War of Independence] Zemorah, Bitan. OCLC 21330115.
- Milstein, Uri (2012), The Birth of a Palestinian Nation: The Myth of the Deir Yassin Massacre, Gefen Publishing House, ISBN 978-965-229-582-8
- Tal, Yerech (8 September 1991), "There was no massacre there", Haaretz, p. B3
- Rubinstein, Danny (11 September 1991), "Indeed there was a massacre there", Haaretz
- "Deir Yassin: History of a Lie" (PDF). zoa.org. Zionist Organization of America. 9 March 1998. Archived from the original (PDF) on 26 September 2011. also see: "here". deiryassin.org. Archived from the original on 24 July 2008.
- "Remembering Deir Yassin". Zochrot. 2006. Archived from the original on 9 April 2016 – via YouTube.
- Zogby, James, Remembering Deir Yassin, archived from the original on 3 March 2016 originally appeared in Al-Ahram Weekly, accessed 26 June 2016.
