= Yehuda Lapidot =

Israeli historian (1928–2026)

- יהודה לפידות
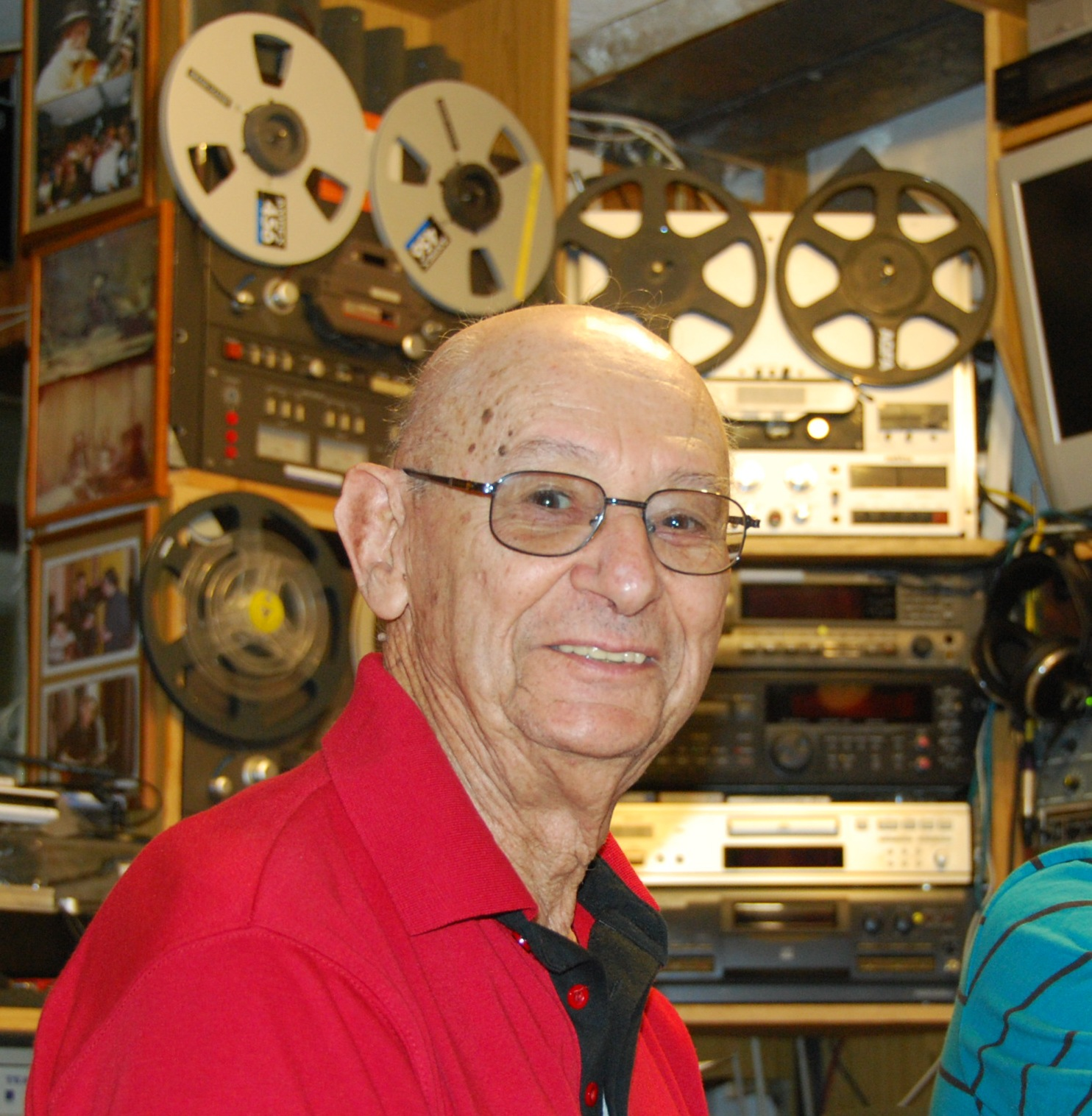
- Lapidot in 2009
- Born: 13 August 1928
- Died: 11 August 2026 (aged 97)

Academic background
- Education: Hebrew University of Jerusalem

Academic work
- Discipline: Biochemistry
- Military career
- Branch: Irgun
- Conflicts: 1947–1948 civil war in Mandatory Palestine; 1948 Arab-Israeli War

Yehuda Lapidot (Hebrew: יהודה לפידות; 13 August 1928 – 11 August 2026) was an Israeli historian and academic who was a professor of biochemistry, as well as a veteran of the Zionist militia Irgun.

== Irgun years ==
Yehuda Lapidot was born in Mandatory Palestine on 13 August 1928. As a member of the Yishuv, Lapidot's land of birth was known to him as Eretz Yisrael. At age 15, he joined Irgun, taking the nom de guerre "Nimrod" and soon became active in the Irgun's Combat Corps (Hayil Kravi) in Ramat Gan, being responsible for maintaining weapon arsenals there and in Bnei Brak.

During the Jewish insurgency in Palestine, also known as the Revolt, he took part in anti-British operations. On 2 April 1946, he participated in a major operation to sabotage the railway network in southern Palestine, and was severely wounded in the arm. While recuperating from his injury, which prevented him from using a gun, he worked in the Irgun's propaganda department, where he was director of its foreign press section.

In 1947, he was transferred to Jerusalem, and served as a commander during the 1947–1948 civil war. Initially, his role was to train new recruits. His most notable action during this period was taking part in a joint Irgun-Lehi attack on the Arab village of Deir Yassin, in what would later become known as the Deir Yassin massacre. After Benzion Cohen, the overall Irgun commander of the operation, was wounded, he took charge of the Irgun force and led it through most of the fighting.

During the 1948 Arab-Israeli War, he served as a company commander, and took part in fighting at Ramat Rachel and in Operation Kedem, during which he led a unit that was part of the final Israeli attempt to capture Jerusalem's Old City during the war. His force successfully broke through the New Gate and into the Old City, while other Israeli forces failed to reach their objectives, and Israeli commander David Shaltiel ordered a general retreat shortly before an imminent pre-agreed cease-fire came into effect. For his actions Lapidot was twice mentioned in dispatches.

Lapidot also led the establishment of the agricultural training farm at Shuni Fortress.

== Career: biochemistry, politics and history ==
In 1949, he began studying biochemistry at the Hebrew University of Jerusalem, and received a PhD in biochemistry in 1960. In 1973, he was appointed a professor of biochemistry at the Hebrew University.

In 1981, Israeli Prime Minister and former Irgun commander Menachem Begin appointed Lapidot head of Nativ, an Israeli liaison organization maintaining contacts with Jews living in the Eastern Bloc. He remained in the position until 1985.

In 1988, he retired from the Hebrew University and began researching the history of the British Palestine Mandate era, especially the history of the Jewish insurgency against British rule.

== Death ==
Lapidot died on 11 August 2026, two days before his 98th birthday.

== Published books ==
In the 1990s, Lapidot wrote four books on the history of the Irgun and the Revolt:

- Upon Thy Walls, Ministry of Defence, 1992
- The Hunting Season, Jabotinsky Institute, 1994
- The Flames of Revolt, Ministry of Defence, 1996
- Chapters in the History of the Irgun, Jabotinsky Institute, 1999

== Bibliography ==
- Besieged Jerusalem 1948: Memories of an Irgun Fighter

== Sources ==
- Raviv, Dan and Melman, Yossi (1990). Every Spy a Prince: The Complete History of Israel's Intelligence Community. Boston: Houghton Mifflin Company. ISBN 0-395-47102-8
