= Mühlstein =

Mühlstein or Muhlstein is a surname of German origin, either a nickname for a heavy person or a toponymic surname from the historic village of Mühlstein in Baden-Württemberg, Germany, derived from the Middle High German word for millstone. Notable people with the surname include:

- Anatol Mühlstein (1889–1957), Polish diplomat and writer
- Anka Muhlstein (born 1935), French historian and biographer
- Florian Mühlstein (born 1990), Austrian ice hockey player
- Jan Mühlstein (born 1949), German Jewish activist and journalist

== See also ==
- Millstein, an Americanized spelling
