= Ohad Milstein =

Israeli documentary filmmaker (born 1973)

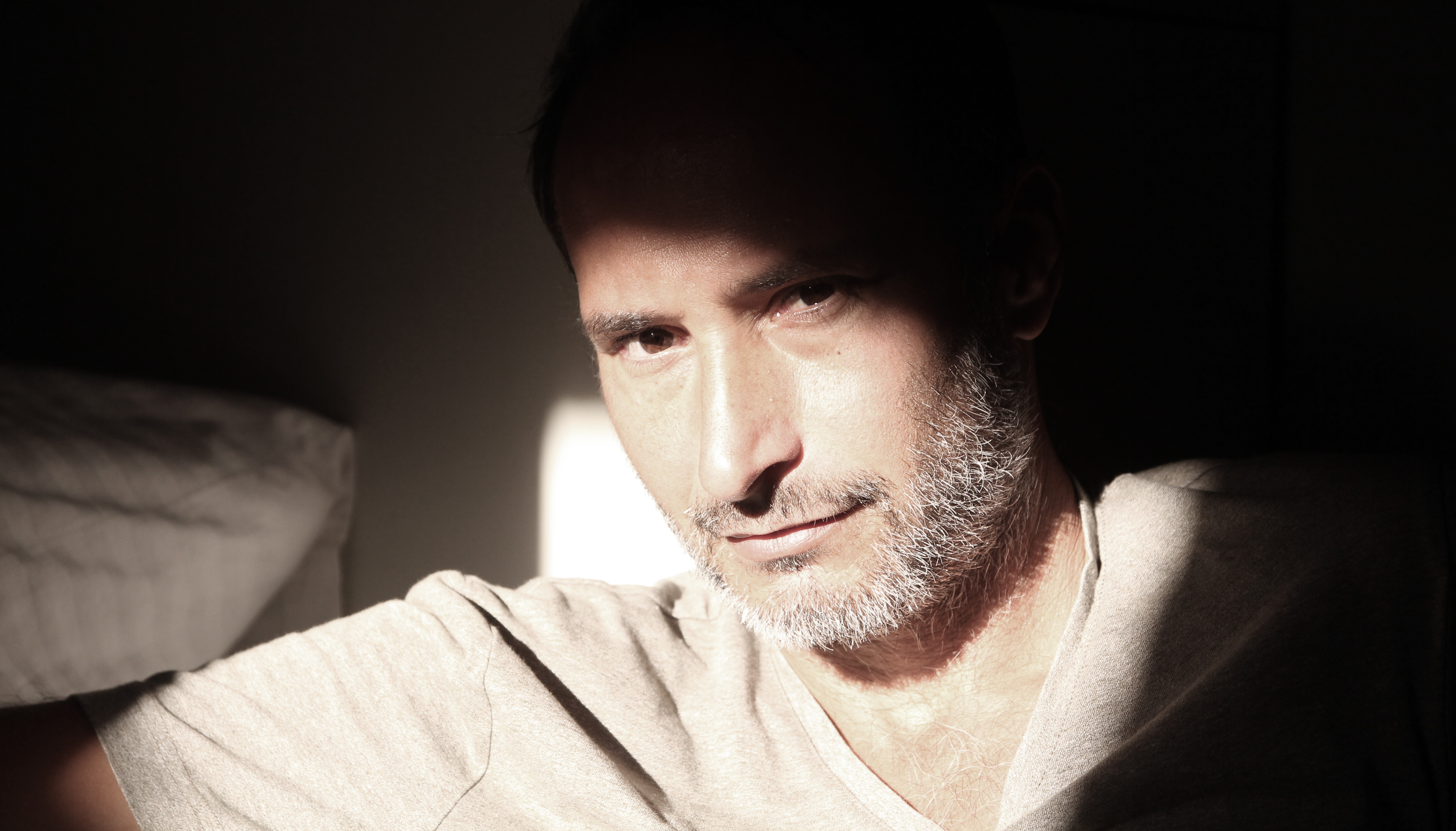

Ohad Milstein (Hebrew: אוהד מילשטיין; born 1973) is an Israeli documentary filmmaker, photographer and video artist, located in Israel, Tel Aviv. His Films show the cinematic & artistic components within a narrative and its constructive-formalistic aspects. Milstein studied Cinema (BA) at Tel Aviv University from 1996 to 2000 and Photography & art (MFA) at Bezalel Academy of Arts and Design from 2003 to 2005. He has a distinctive cinematic language combining art and documentary cinema. Milstein teaches cinema at the Screen-Based Arts department of Bezalel Academy of Arts and Design.

== Filmography ==
- Monogamia (2023) - Semaine de la Critique Grand Prix Winner, Locarno film festival 2023.
- Knock on the door (2023) - Won Best Documentary award at the Jewish Film Festival Berlin | Brandenburg 2023.
- Summer Nights (2021) - Won the Israel Academy Award (Best Documentary) 2021. Won The Frank Lowy award for the best Israeli film, Docaviv film festival 2021. Won Best Documentary award at the Jewish Film Festival Berlin | Brandenburg 2022.
- Flood (2018) - developed at Greenhous 2013. International premier dok.fest Munich, national premiere at DocAviv (Competition).
- Week 23 (2016) - World premiered at DocAviv (Competition). Won 3 awards of the Documentary Guild 2016: Best mid length documentary, best cinematography, best artistic design.
- Planets - Four Variations of Detachment (2014) - World premiere at DocAviv the international competition "Depth of field'. Won the jury Special Mention prize for its Artistic vision. Won the Best Israeli Documentary prize- "Free-docs" category 2014.
- Systema (2010) - developed at the IDFAcdemy Amsterdam 2009, premiered at Docaviv film festival (Official selection). Won the Best Israeli Documentary prize- "Free-docs" category 2011.
- Obsession (2008)- premiered at DocAviv Film Festival (Official selection), and was nominated for the Israeli Film and Television Academy Award.
