= Todd Millstein =

American computer scientist

Academic background
- Education: Brown University; University of Washington
- Thesis: Programming Language Support for Reusable, Reliable Software Components
- Doctoral advisor: Craig Chambers

Academic work
- Institutions: UCLA

Todd Millstein is an American computer scientist. He is Professor of Computer Science and Chair of the Department at the UCLA Henry Samueli School of Engineering and Applied Science.

Millstein grew up in suburban Maryland, outside of Washington D.C. Millstein received his A.B from Brown University in 1996, where he was advised by Paris Kanellakis and Pascal Van Hentenryck. He attended the University of Washington for graduate studies, graduating with an M.Sc. and PhD in 2003. At UW, he was advised by Craig Chambers.

His research focus primarily spans software verification and reliability. He has published more than 100 technical research papers, including best paper awards at OOPSLA, PLDI, and SIGCOMM. He received the 2011 Most Influential PLDI Paper Award for his 2001 paper "Automatic Predicate Abstraction of C Programs".

Millstein joined the faculty of the University of California, Los Angeles in 2003. He was appointed chair of the department in 2022, having previously served as vice chair for graduate studies.
