= Uri Milstein =

Israeli military historian (born 1940)

- אורי מילשטיין
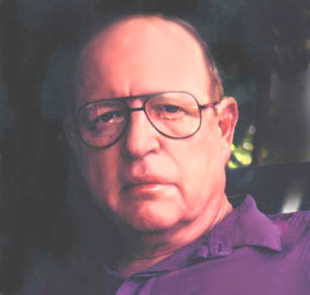
- Uri Milstein
- Born: 1940 (age 85–86)
- Citizenship: Israel
- Occupation: Military historian

Uri Milstein (Hebrew: אורי מילשטיין; born 29 February 1940) is an Israeli historian and philosopher, specializing in military history. He is one of the first academics to openly criticize the Israeli defense establishment.

== Biography ==
Uri Milstein was born in Tel Aviv to Avraham Milstein, a volunteer in the British army in World War II, and Sarah Milstein, a kindergarten teacher. His parents were among the founders of Afikim, a kibbutz near the Sea of Galilee. His father was a member of Mapai—David Ben-Gurion's political party—and Haganah, the paramilitary organisation of the Jewish Agency. His older brother was a member of the Palmach—Haganah's "strike force". Milstein himself was a member of Mapai's youth party, HaTnuah HaMe'uchedet (lit. The United Movement).

Milstein studied at Hayil school in Tel Aviv's Yad Eliyahu neighborhood, Hadassim youth village, and Ironi He High School. In 1958, he was drafted into the Israel Defense Forces (IDF) and served in the 890th Airborne Battalion of the Paratroopers Brigade as a soldier, squad commander and combat medic. Before being discharged, deputy commander of the brigade, Rafael Eitan, appointed him as the historian of the paratroopers. He served as a medic in the Six-Day War, the War of Attrition and the Yom Kippur War, and did his reserve duty in the history department of the Israeli Air Force. In 1974 he was relieved of his post as historian of the paratroopers by Yitzhak Mordechai, commander of the 35th Paratroopers Brigade. Milstein says this was on account of his publicizing his research on the Battle of the Chinese Farm, in which Mordechai was involved.

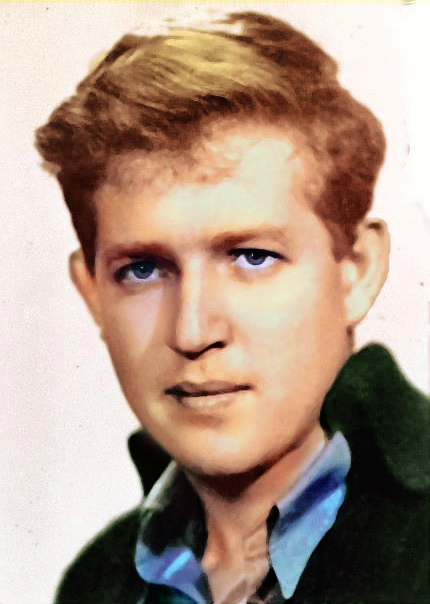
As a teenager in 1957

Milstein is married to the actress Shifra (Ben David) Milstein, with whom he has two daughters. His daughter Dalit is the co-founder and director of Notzar Theater.

== Academic career ==
After completing his service in the IDF in 1960, he studied economics, philosophy and political science at the Hebrew University of Jerusalem. He wrote his PhD on religion and legislation in Israel. After the Six-Day War, he published War of the Paratroops, and at the beginning of 1973 he published a military history of the early days of Israeli statehood, By Blood and Fire Judea. In the 1980s, he taught military history at the IDF Command and Staff College. In 1989, Milstein published the first volume of his series on the War of Independence, in which he alleged flawed functioning of commanders who were considered heroes in Israel. Time assessed it as "the definitive history of the war". Benny Morris, a professor at Ben-Gurion University, wrote then in The Jerusalem Post and later in Yedioth Ahronoth that until the publication of these books, all that had been written on the war was "a historical smear" and that only from these books is the true story being told. Louis Rene Beres, a professor at Purdue University, wrote that the books are "a strategic asset for the state of Israel". Only four of the planned twelve volumes had been published when publication was stopped in 1991. Milstein blamed this on "pressure from Palmach veterans Yitzhak Rabin, Amos Chorev, Zvi Zamir, and others, who were harmed by the truth finally coming out". Milstein is presently trying to raise the resources to continue publication himself. In 1993, he published Crisis and Its Conclusion, criticizing the functioning of the IDF in the Yom Kippur War.

In 1995 he published The Rabin File: How the Myth Was Inflated about Yitzhak Rabin as a commander of the Palmach. In 2010 he reprinted it as "Rabin's Way and Legacy" [in Hebrew] with some changes, and an additional volume dealing with Rabin's later years, and contributions from other authors about what they term "Rabin's real legacy".

In his introduction, Milstein writes: "as Rabin had so much influence on the people of Israel, I endeavor to understand as much about the man as I can, I will investigate everything that had an effect on him, his genealogy, his personal early life, and everything else."

Milstein writes that Rabin had a deprived childhood due to his parents-especially his mother- being preoccupied with their socialist activism, and not showing him love and attention. Milstein maintains that this caused Rabin to have an underdeveloped personality and strong feelings of insecurity, which would manifest themselves throughout the life of Rabin the adult. Milstein's favorite claim on Rabin is that he fled the battle he commanded on April 20, 1948; and that altogether, for his 54-year involvement in matters relating to Israel's security, "Rabin has not one known military action worthy of praise!"

Milstein established the Survival Institute and a book publishing house under the similar name (Hebrew: שרידות, lit. 'Survival'). After that, he taught at the Ariel University Center of Samaria.

== Views and opinions ==
Milstein is one of the first academics to openly criticize the Israeli defense establishment. He is described as being too extreme in his conclusions, but his "contribution to the knowledge is enormous" (Milstein has been researching Israeli military history for over 50 years, and claims to have conducted thousands of interviews, and to have a total of 500 gigabytes of interviews and documents.)

In 1988 in Military Court in defense of the sentry from the "Night of the Gliders", Milstein testified that fleeing in the face of danger is a normal phenomenon, that even men who achieved high rank in the IDF acted thus. When the judges asked him to elaborate he told of Yitzhak Rabin (then minister of defense) fleeing the battle he commanded on April 20, 1948 (the "blood convoy"). The judges ignored his testimony and Rabin's office refused to speak to journalists about it. Milstein claims that shortly before his death, at a gathering of ex-Palmach members Rabin admitted fleeing the battle.

In Blood Libel at Deir Yassin – The Black Book, Milstein claims that the Deir Yassin massacre was a myth created by the Israeli left in order to prevent the Irgun from forming an independent unit inside the IDF. It was also meant to keep Irgun commander Menachem Begin out of the first national unity government under David Ben-Gurion, and that Begin and the Irgun themselves went along with it to successfully scare the Arabs.

Milstein is a supporter of the thesis that the Soviet Union intended to assault Germany in 1941. Milstein explains his interest in this by saying that due to the way his own research was ignored when it led to provocative revelations, he developed an interest in research that upset the common wisdom-and got ignored.

Milstein's main theme is how the political and military powers of Israel (though not only of Israel) protect their power and prestige at the expense of performance. In the Six-Day War, Israel's most famous victory, Milstein pointed out that General Uzi Narkis, commander of Central Command, refused to hold an inquiry on their foul-ups, saying "don't launder our dirty clothing in public". Milstein said "The IDF didn't investigate the battles for Jerusalem at any level, and the Israeli public including the army, thirstily drank the myths which many commanders created and were popularized by journalists. The legends which accompanied the capture of Jerusalem are the most tangible showing of Israels culture of mythology, which resulted in the failures of the War of Attrition, the Yom Kippur War, and the (First) Lebanon War… The heads of state and the senior IDF commanders are directly responsible for the failures caused by failing to learn the lessons."

In "Rabin's Way and Legacy" Milstein writes in the prologue: "Even if we hadn't known that Rabin fled the battlefield he commanded on April 20, 1948, that he was fired from all his active military commands in Israel's Independence War, and that he received electric shocks in a psychiatric hospital in May 1967, even so we would have to follow the principle of René Descartes: I think (question), therefore I am (Cogito ergo sum), or to the motto of the Royal Society "Do not believe the words of man" (nullius in verba). Milstein maintains that Rabin, long revered as "Mr. Defense" and "The Warrior Par Excellence" achieved nothing militarily, knew nothing about economics, and had violent confrontations with his wife."

== Published works ==
=== Poetry ===
- After All, 1965, Kiryat Sefer publishers (in Hebrew)

=== Military history ===
- The Blond Bear, 1970 Ramdor Publishers (in Hebrew)
- The War of the Paratroopers, 2 vols. 1968 (in Hebrew)
- The History of the Paratroopers, 4 vols. 1985–1987 (in Hebrew)
- History of Israel's War of Independence, 4 vols. out of 12 projected, 1996–1999. University Press of America
  - History of the War of Independence: A nation girds for war, Volume 1 of History of the War of Independence, Uri Milstein, Allan Sacks, ISBN 0-7618-0372-6, ISBN 978-0-7618-0372-0
  - History of the War of Independence: The first month, Volume 2 of History of the War of Independence, Uri Milstein, Allan Sacks, ISBN 0-7618-0721-7, ISBN 978-0-7618-0721-6
- The Shaked Patrol, Miskal Publishers, 1994.
- The Rabin File: An Unauthorized Expose (English), 2000, Authors: Uri Milstein, Aryeh ʻAmit, Gefen Publishing House, ISBN 965-229-196-X, 9789652291967, 472 pages
- The Rabin File – The Myth And Its Collapse 2005 Survival Institute Publishers
- Blood Libel at Deir Yassin – The Black Book 2007 National Midrasha Publishers and Survival Institute Publishers. The book presents testimonies purporting to refute the claim that a force of the Irgun underground committed a massacre at the Arab village of Deir Yassin in the 1948 war, and accuses leaders of the Israeli community of promoting the massacre story to discredit their political opponents.
- The Birth of a Palestinian Nation: The Myth of the Deir Yassin Massacre Gefen Publishing House, 2012. ISBN 978-965-229-582-8

=== Critique of Military ===
- The Outbreak of War 1992
- The Crossing Which Wasn't 1992. Yaron Golan Publishers (in Hebrew)
- The Lesson of a Collapse 1993. Survival Publishers And Yediot Ahronot (in Hebrew)

=== Critique of Civilization ===
- Razmach, Pamphlets Of Literature, 1970.
- The General Theory of Security – the Survival Principle, (English & Hebrew) 1999 Survival Institute Publishers
- New Administration for Israel – An Intellectual-Political Alternative, 1993 (English & Hebrew)
- An End to Life, 1994 Survival Institute Publishers (English & Hebrew)
- The Oasis of Dreams, The Legend of Hadassim, 2006 Survival Publishing, (English & Hebrew), (an autobiography of The Generation of the State)

== Bibliography ==
- Milstein, Uri (2010). דרך רבין ומורשתו [Rabin's Way and Legacy] (in Hebrew). Hebrew: הוצאת שרידות, lit. 'Survival Publishing'. pp. 1, 115.
