= Intercommunal conflict in Mandatory Palestine =

1920–1948 conflict between Arabs and Jews in Palestine

- Part of the Israeli–Palestinian conflict and precursor to the 1948 Palestine War
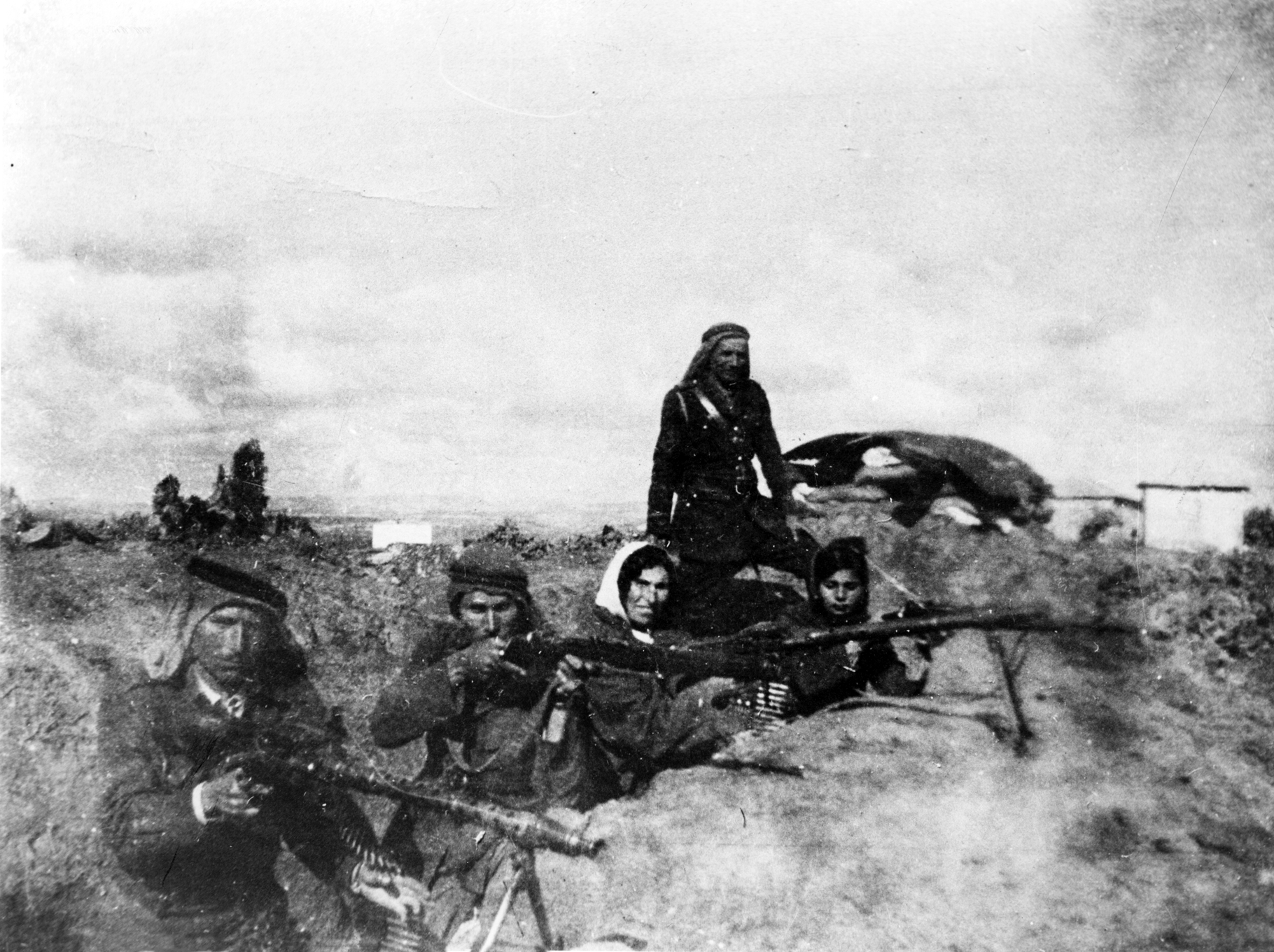
- Insurgents in the 1936–1939 Palestinian Revolt against British colonial rule and its support of Zionism
| Date | 1 March 1920 – 14 May 1948 (28 years, 2 months, 1 week and 6 days); See also: Timeline of Intercommunal conflict in Mandatory Palestine |
| Location | Palestine during the British Mandate |
| Result | Outbreak of 1947–1948 civil war in Mandatory Palestine following the UN adoption of Resolution 181 (II) recommending the partition of Palestine |

Belligerents
| (Israel) Jewish National Council (Yishuv); Haganah; POSH; Peulot Meyuhadot; Irgun (1931–48); Lehi (1940–48) | Arab Higher Committee (Palestinian Arabs): Fasa'il (1936–39); Army of the Holy War (1947–48); Arab Liberation Army (1947–48); Central Committee of National Jihad in Palestine (1937–39); Jihadist groups: Black Hand (1929–1935) | United Kingdom: British Army; Palestine Police Force; Jewish Settlement Police; Jewish Supernumerary Police; Special Night Squads |

During the British rule in Mandatory Palestine, there was civil, political and armed struggle among Palestinian Arabs, the Jewish Yishuv, and British colonial forces, beginning from the violent spillover of the Franco-Syrian War in 1920 and until the onset of the 1948 Arab–Israeli War. The conflict shifted from sectarian clashes in the 1920s and early 1930s to an armed Arab Revolt against British rule in 1936, armed Jewish Revolt primarily against the British in mid-1940s and finally open war in November 1947 between Arabs and Jews.

== Background ==
=== Zionist movement during Ottoman period ===
The Life of the Jews in Palestine, a Russian documentary film by Noah Sokolovsky presented at the 11th Zionist congress in 1913.

Zionist leaders and advocates followed conditions in the land of Israel closely and travelled there regularly. In their correspondence early Zionist negotiators did not discuss the future of the land's Arab inhabitants, who numbered just under half a million during the late 19th century.

According to Anita Shapira, among 19th and early 20th century Zionists:

The Arabs in Palestine were viewed as one more of the many misfortunes present in Palestine, like the Ottoman authorities, the climate, difficulties of adjustment, ... [T]he Zionist organization did not discuss this issue during that period and did not formulate a political line on it. Yet at that particular juncture in the movement such deliberations ... had about the same importance as the learned disputations customarily held in the courtyards of Hassidic rebbes regarding what would happen after the coming of the messiah.

Early Zionists viewed the Arab residents of Palestine as part of a larger Arab nation. Israel Zangwill, writing just after the First World War, said: 'The Arabs should recognize that the road of renewed national glory lies through Baghdad, Damascus and Mecca, and all the vast territories freed for them from the Turks and be content. ... The powers that freed them have surely the right to ask them not to begrudge the petty strip (Israel) necessary for the renaissance of a still more down-trodden people.'

Menachem Ussishkin and Ber Borochov, Zionist leaders in the Diaspora and, according to Anita Shapira, unfamiliar with true Arab attitudes, expressed their belief that the Palestinian Arabs would be assimilated by the Jews. Since the Jews were further developed they would take the lead in the development of the country and the Arabs would subject themselves to Jewish cultural influence and assimilate. Borochov also said that the Arabs were a "people akin to us in blood and spirit", and embraced the concept of the brotherhood between all the descendants of Shem as the basis of his outlook. According to Shapira, this approach was part of a campaign of self-persuasion that the Arabs would not threaten the realisation of Zionist aims.

According to Jonah Frankel, the immigrants of the Second Aliyah had a strong secular and nationalist ethos. The attitude towards the Arabs took many forms, however. On one pole there were those like Yitshak Epstein and Rabi Binyamin, who held that Zionism should not antagonise the Arabs. Epstein advocated settlement only in areas not worked by the Arabs. Rabi Binyamin held that modern education, full equality and modernisation would bring the Arabs to accept massive Jewish immigration. On the other pole there were those who assumed that in order to reach their goal the Zionists would have to defeat violent Arab resistance. According to Shapira, Yosef Haim Brenner wrote "There is now, (and) there is bound to be hatred between [Jews and Arabs], and it will exist in the future too." A mythology connecting descent to land was often a theme for them. For instance K.L. Silman wrote:

We shed our blood and we live here. Our life is the continuation of the past and so too is the spilt blood. A nation does not build its life except on the foundations of its past and blood is joined to blood.

According to Frankel, this kind of mythology was an important part of the Second Aliyah's political legacy.

In response to Arab attacks under the Turks, the Zionists in Palestine established Hashomer (the Guardian), a self-defence organisation.

=== Arab nationalism and Arab response to Zionism ===
In 1856, the Ottomans issued the Hatt-i Humayun, guaranteeing equal rights for all Ottoman subjects. Despite this, Muslims still viewed Jews as dhimmis: people protected by, but subordinate to Muslims. Jews remained second-class citizens of the Ottoman Empire until its collapse in World War I. This changed when, due to Jewish immigration and land purchase in the late 19th century, they realised that Zionism wanted to make a Jewish state in Palestine. Both Palestinian Christians and Muslims were worried.

According to historian Benny Morris, traditional contemptuous Muslim attitudes towards Jews affected the Zionist colonists in Palestine in the late 19th century. They drove the Zionists to "occasional overassertiveness" in an effort to wipe out their traditional image. On the other hand, the view of the Jews as "unassertive and subservient" initially placated the Arabs towards the Zionism movement, but later added to the humiliation of being "humbled."

In 1897, an Arab commission was formed in Jerusalem, headed by the mufti, to investigate land sales to Jews. Its protests led to the cessation of these sales for a number of years. Arab peasants usually protested if Jewish landowners ousted them from their homes, and violence and armed resistance did occur. However Jewish landownership was accepted if the peasants were permitted to stay.

Yusuf al-Khalidi, the Mayor of Jerusalem, wrote to the chief rabbi of France in 1899 that "historically, this is really [a Jewish] country" and that the Zionist idea was, in principle, "completely natural, fine and just." However, he also recognized that the implementation of Zionism would require "brute force" and implored that "Palestine be left in peace."

Rashid Rida stated in 1902 that Zionism did not simply seek a safe haven for the Jews, but aimed at national sovereignty. Naguib Azoury, a Maronite Christian from Beirut, predicted violent clashes between Arabs and Jews in Palestine.

After the Young Turk Revolution in 1908, Arab nationalism grew rapidly in the area and most Arab nationalists regarded Zionism as a threat, although a minority perceived Zionism as providing a path to modernity. According to C. D. Smith, this was due to the emergence of Labour Zionism, which openly opposed Jewish employment of Arabs, condemned leaving Arab peasants on land held by Jews, and aimed at a separate Jewish entity in Palestine. Since these issues were discussed in the Jewish press, they also became known to Palestinian Arabs, especially after a Palestinian Arab press had appeared. The two most anti-Zionist newspapers Al-Karmil, founded in 1908 in Haifa, and Filastin, founded in 1911 in Jaffa, were run by Orthodox Christians. In the Ottoman parliament in Istanbul, Palestinian representatives called for greater Ottoman vigilance against Zionism.

Anti-Semitic sentiments were also on the rise during this period. Imported antisemitic literature was translated into Arabic, such as The Protocols of the Elders Zion, parts of which were reprinted in Filastin in 1920, and a full translation published in Cairo in 1927. According to historian Bernard Lewis, Arabic literature pushing antisemitic sentiments exploded in the 1920s.

Yosef Gorny investigated the ideological characteristics of Zionism in the Jewish-Arab confrontation in his book Zionism and the Arabs, 1882–1948. He says two ideological questions were important. The first was whether the Palestinian Arabs were part of a greater Arab nation or constituted a separate Palestinian national entity. The second was to what extent Zionism could base its demands on historical rights. Zionism's aim "to construct in Palestine a distinct Jewish national society" meant that it also honoured certain principles that affected its attitude towards the Arabs. Gorny distinguishes the "desire for territorial concentration of the Jewish people in Palestine", the "desire to create a Jewish majority in Palestine", the "belief that exclusive employment of Jewish labour was the precondition for an independent Jewish society", and the "renaissance of Hebrew culture [as] a pre-condition for the rebirth of the nation".

Demographics in Palestine
| year | Jews | Arabs |
|---|---|---|
| 1800 | 6,700 | 268,000 |
| 1880 | 24,000 | 525,000 |
| 1915 | 87,500 | 590,000 |
| 1931 | 174,000 | 837,000 |
| 1947 | 630,000 | 1,310,000 |

Gorny also distinguishes several important developments that had their bearing on the confrontation and the Zionists' attitude. Up to 1917, Zionism was tolerated as a national movement in the Ottoman Empire. After 1917, Palestine became a Mandate administrated by the British, and the right of the Jewish people to a national homeland in Palestine was recognised by the British and the League of Nations. In 1948, the state of Israel was established. Simultaneously, the Palestine problem became an ever more important subject for Jews, Arabs and the international community. During this period the demographic balance changed from one Jew in every 23 inhabitants in 1880 to one Jew in every three inhabitants in 1947 (see table). Finally, Gorny says the uneven pace of Westernization gave the Jewish society a technological and organizational advantage. Jewish society was mainly urban, Arab society mainly rural.

In his book Zionism and the Palestinians, Shima Flapan distinguishes six basic concepts of Zionism's policy toward the Arabs:

(1) gradual build-up of an economic and military potential as the basis for achievement of political aims,
(2) alliance with a great power external to the Middle East;
(3) non-recognition of the existence of a Palestine national entity;
(4) Zionism's civilising mission in an undeveloped area;
(5) economic, social and cultural segregation as prerequisites for the renaissance of Jewish national life;
(6) the concept of 'peace from strength'.

Norman Finkelstein says the "strategic consensus [in the Zionist movement] on the Arab Question was remarkable". This consensus was informed by three premises: (1) "the Zionist movement should neither expect, nor seek the acquiescence of the Palestinian Arabs"; (2) "the success of the Zionist enterprise was dependent on the support of one (or more) Great Power(s)"; (3) the Palestine conflict should be resolved within the framework of a regional alliance subordinate to the interests of the Great Power(s)".

In line with earlier promises by Ben-Gurion, Israel's Declaration of Independence states that "[Israel] will ensure complete equality of social and political rights to all its inhabitants irrespective of religion, race or sex."

=== Under British occupation administration ===
Various factors increased Arab fears after World War I. Among these were the creation of Palestine in 1918 and the Balfour Declaration. The British also granted Zionist requests that Hebrew become a language with an equal status to Arab in official proclamations, that Jewish government employees earn more than Arab and that the Zionists were permitted to fly their flag, whereas Arabs were not. Many Jews in Palestine acted as if the achievement of a Jewish state was imminent. Furthermore, in 1919 some Jewish papers called for forced emigration of Palestinian Arabs.

For a while, the Muslim–Christian Association, founded in November 1918 and made up of leading notables, became the leading Palestinian nationalist forum. Younger Palestinian Arabs saw the inclusion of Palestine in a pan-Arab state as the best means to foil Zionist goals. Among them was the future mufti of Jerusalem, Haj Amin al-Husseini. They wanted to join Palestine with Syria, ruled by King Faisal. They were suspicious of Faisal, though, because of his apparent collaboration with Chaim Weizmann, and identified more with the Syrian National Congress.

The Franco-Syrian War erupted in March 1920, as an attempt to establish an Arab Hashemite Kingdom in all of the Levant. In a number of notable incidents the war spilled into neighbouring Mandatory Palestine, including the Battle of Tel Hai in March 1920. Further, in April 1920, Amin al-Husseini and other Arab leaders initiated the 1920 Jerusalem riots where 10 people were killed and 250 others wounded. Several women were raped and two synagogues burned. Jews were particularly shocked by these events and viewed the events as a pogrom.

After the British had left Syria for the French, in July 1920, Faisal's rule in Syria collapsed and pan-Arab hopes in Palestine were dashed.

== Ideology: the right to the land ==
=== Zionist positions ===
Israel's Declaration of Independence states "In [1897] the First Zionist Congress convened and proclaimed the right of the Jewish people to national rebirth in its own country." and further on, "we, [the signatories] by virtue of our natural and historic right and on the strength of the resolution of the United Nations General Assembly, hereby declare the establishment of a Jewish state in Eretz Israel." This illustrates Zionism's claim of a historic right as a people to the Land of Israel.

All three tendencies within Zionism's consensus, political, labour and cultural Zionism, demanded a Jewish majority. Adherents of political Zionism argued that national bonds were the most important bonds linking individuals. They argued that "Jews constituted an 'alien' presence amidst states 'belonging' to other, numerically preponderant, nationalities." They proposed to remedy this by forming a state with a Jewish majority. According to Finkelstein, labour Zionism added to this that a Jewish state was the only way to amend the deficit of Jewish labourers in the Diaspora and to create a healthy class structure among Jews. Cultural Zionism wanted to counter the danger of assimilation and loss of Jewish culture. To them, a Jewish majority would ensure a spiritual centre for the 'unbridled spiritual renaissance of the Jewish people'.

According to Finkelstein, "the mainstream Zionist movement never doubted its 'historical right' to impose a Jewish state through the 'Right of Return' on the indigenous Arab population of Palestine", and in fact claimed for the Jewish people a prevalent right to Israel, their historical homeland, and acceded the Arabs only rights as incidental residents. Zionism justified this with two 'facts': the bond of the Jewish nation with Palestine, as derived from its history, was unique, while the Arabs of Palestine were part of the Arab nation and therefore had no special bond with Palestine. Therefore, the Jews had a preemptive right to Palestine. For example, Aaron David Gordon, whose teachings formed the main intellectual inspiration of the labour leaders, wrote in 1921:

For Eretz Israel, we have a charter that has been valid until now and that will always be valid, and that is the Bible [... including the Gospels and the New Testament ...] It all came from us; it was created among us. ... And what did the Arabs produce in all the years they lived in the country? Such creations, or even the creation of the Bible alone, give us a perpetual right over the land in which we were so creative, especially since the people that came after us did not create such works in this country, or did not create anything at all.

According to Zeev Sternhell, "The founders accepted this point of view. This was the ultimate Zionist argument."

Y. Gorny says leaders from various branches of Zionism claimed such a prevalent right:

- The cultural Zionist Ahad Ha'am "saw the historical rights of the Jews as outweighing the Arabs' residential rights in Palestine".
- Theodor Herzl's companion Max Nordau, a political Zionist, declared that Palestine was the "legal and historical inheritance" of the Jewish nation, and that the Palestinian Arabs had only "possession rights".
- David Ben-Gurion, labour Zionism's most important leader, held that the Jewish people had a superior right to Palestine, that Palestine was important to the Jews as a nation and to the Arabs as individuals, and hence the right of the Jewish people to concentrate in Palestine, a right which was not due to the Arabs.
- Zeev Jabotinsky, leader of the more radical revisionist Zionists, held that since Palestine was only a very small part of the Land held by the Arab nation, "requisition of an area of land from a nation with large stretches of territory, in order to make a home for a wandering people is an act of justice, and if the land-owning nation does not wish to cede it (and this is completely natural) it must be compelled".

The dissident Zionists in Brit Shalom and Ihud thought differently. Hugo Bergmann wrote in 1929: "our opponents [in mainstream Zionism] hold different views. When they speak of Palestine, of our country, they mean 'our country', that is to say 'not their country' [... this belief is based on the concept that in a State] one people, among the people residing there, should be granted the majority right.", and Ernst Simon held that the historical right "is binding on us rather than on the Arabs" and therefore an agreement with the Arabs is necessary.

According to Anita Shapira, in the early 1940s young Jews came to believe that "[t]he land was theirs, theirs alone. This feeling was accompanied by a fierce sense of possessiveness, of joyous anticipation of the fight for it".

==== Non-recognition of a Palestinian Arab national entity ====
According to Simha Flapan, a basic concept of Zionist political thinking was the non-recognition of the existence of a Palestinian national entity. He says that Golda Meir's widely published pronouncement that "There was no such thing as Palestinians", was the cornerstone of Zionist policy, initiated by Weizmann and faithfully carried out by Ben-Gurion and his successors. However, Gorny has documented a range of attitudes held by Zionists towards the Palestinian Arabs, a phenomenon which implies recognition, even if only by way of opposition, of a Palestinian national entity.

This argument supported the Zionist claim of the "historical right": the Jews could claim Palestine as the homeland of their nation, while the Palestinian Arabs could not.

==== Territory longed for by Zionism ====
The land longed for by the Zionist movement was "Eretz Israel". Anita Shapira says this term was "a holy term, vague as far as the exact boundaries of the territories are concerned but clearly defining ownership". According to Finkelstein the longed for land incorporated Palestine, Transjordan, the Golan height and the southern part of Lebanon. Ben-Gurion said he wanted to "concentrate the masses of our people in this country and its environs." When he proposed accepting the Peel proposals in 1937, which included a Jewish state in part of Palestine, Ben–Gurion told the twentieth Zionist Congress:

The Jewish state now being offered to us is not the Zionist objective. ... But it can serve as a decisive stage along the path to greater Zionist implementation. It will consolidate in Palestine, within the shortest possible time, the real Jewish force, which will lead us to our historic goal.

In a discussion in the Jewish Agency he said that he wanted a Jewish–Arab agreement "on the assumption that after we become a strong force, as a result of the creation of the state, we shall abolish partition and expand to the whole of Palestine." In a letter to his son Amos he wrote in 1937 that a Jewish state in part of Palestine was "not the end, but only the beginning." It would give a "powerful boost to our historic efforts to redeem the country in its entirety". He wrote that he had "no doubt that our army will be among the world's outstanding—and so I am certain that we won't be constrained from settling in the rest of the country, either by mutual agreement and understanding with our Arab neighbours, or by some other way."

At the Biltmore Conference in 1942 Ben-Gurion formulated the Zionists' demand 'not as a Jewish state in Palestine but as Palestine as a Jewish state'. The Biltmore Program, adopted at that conference by various Zionist and non-Zionist Jewish organizations, called for "Palestine [to] be established as a Jewish Commonwealth".

==== Ben-Gurion' position ====
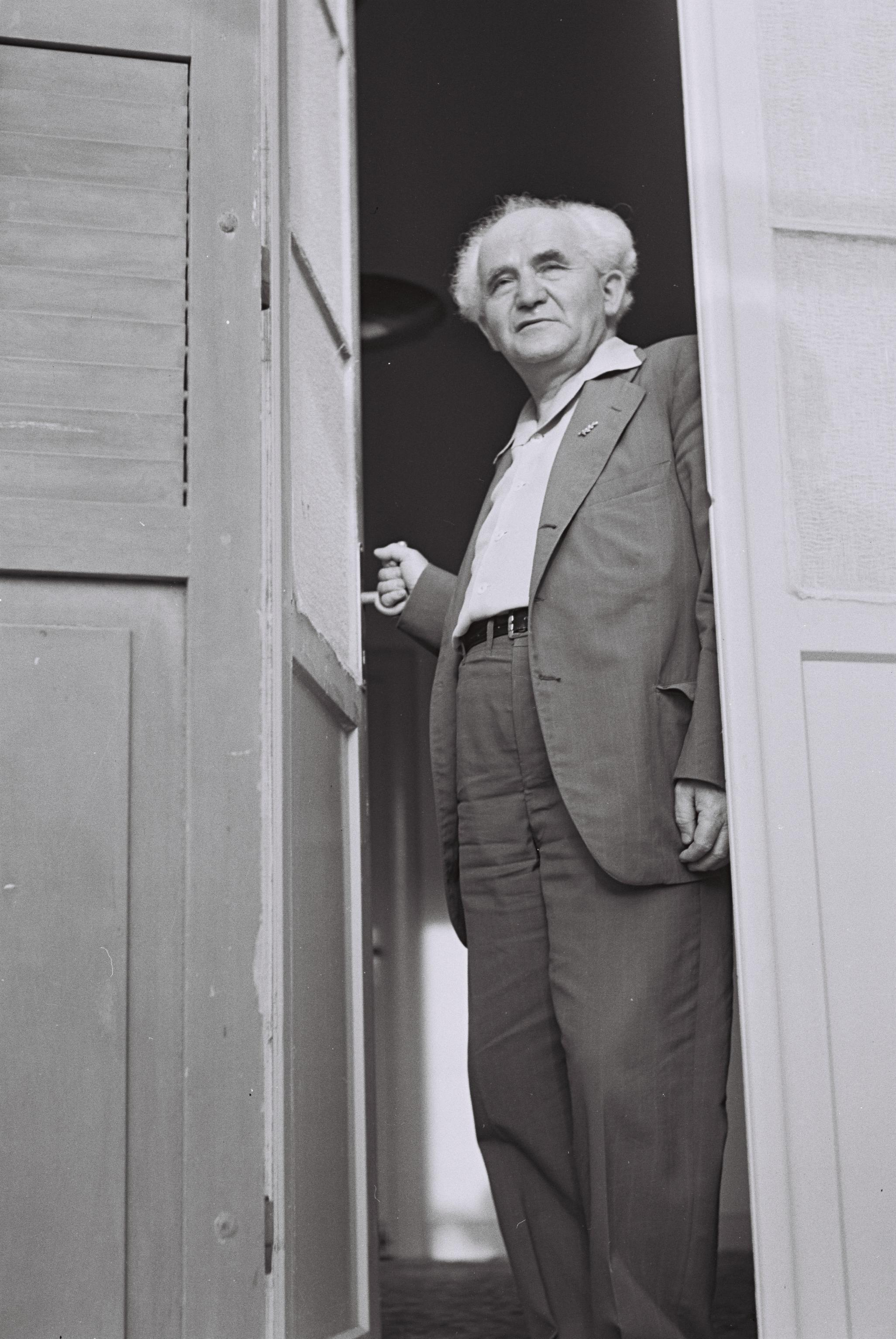
David Ben-Gurion

During the pre-statehood period in Palestine, Ben-Gurion represented the mainstream Jewish establishment and was known as a moderate. He was strongly opposed to the Revisionist Zionist movement led by Ze'ev Jabotinsky and his successor Menachem Begin. Ben-Gurion rarely invoked the "historical right" of the Jewish people to Eretz Israel, but preferred to emphasize the right derived from the Jewish need for a homeland and the universal right to settle and develop uncultivated land.

According to Teveth, during many years Ben-Gurion's principal claim was the Jewish right to work the land, especially the eighty percent of Palestine which was uncultivated, and to win it through Jewish labour. "We have the right to build and be built in Palestine". The right to possess a land derived from the continued willingness to work and develop it, and in that respect Jews and Arabs had equal rights. However Ben-Gurion expressed the belief that the Arabs would fare well by the Jews' renewal of the country, because it also meant the renewal of its Arab population. According to Teveth, "the Arabs, themselves incapable of developing the country, had no right to stand in the way of the Jews. In 1918 [Ben-Gurion] determined that rights did not spring from the past but from the future, and in 1924 he declared: 'We do not recognize the right of Arabs to rule the country, since Palestine is undeveloped and still awaits its builders.'" Ben-Gurion said that the Arabs "have a right only to that which they have created and to their own homes".

According to Teveth, one can trace in Ben-Gurion's thought an "evolution, away from a vision of Zionism as a movement for absolute justice bearing a universal message, a movement of peace and constructive labor. His revised view of Zionism, ... was a movement of relative justice with the Jews its sole concern, a movement prepared to wage war and to take the country, by force, if necessary."

The British 1939 White Paper stipulated that Jewish immigration to Palestine was to be limited to 15,000 a year for the first five years, and would subsequently be contingent on Arab consent. After this Ben-Gurion changed his policy towards the British, stating: "Peace in Palestine is not the best situation for thwarting the policy of the white Paper". Ben-Gurion believed a peaceful solution with the Arabs had no chance and soon began preparing the Yishuv for war. According to Teveth, "through his campaign to mobilize the Yishuv in support of the British war effort, he strove to build the nucleus of a 'Hebrew army', and his success in this endeavor later brought victory to Zionism in the struggle to establish a Jewish state."

In public, Ben-Gurion upheld the official position of his party that denied the necessity of force in achieving Zionist goals. Unlike Weizmann, Ben-Gurion did have a realistic view of the strong attachment of Arab Palestinians to the Palestinian soil. In 1938 he said: "In our political argument abroad we minimize Arab opposition to us. But let us not ignore the truth among ourselves. ... A people which fights against [what it conceives as] the usurpation of its land will not tire so easily." According to Flapan, Ben-Gurion's assessment of Arab feelings led him to an even more militant line on the need to build up Jewish military strength: "I believe in our power, in our power which will grow, and if it will grow agreement will come...".

In the epilogue of Ben-Gurion and the Palestinian Arabs, Shabtai Teveth evaluates Ben-Gurion's policy towards the Arabs up to 1936 as follows:

A careful comparison of Ben-Gurion's public and private positions leads inexorably to the conclusion that this twenty-year denial of the conflict was a calculated tactic, born of pragmatism rather than profundity of conviction. The idea that Jews and Arabs could reconcile their differences through class solidarity, a notion he championed between 1919 and 1929, was a delaying tactic. Once the Yishuv had gained strength, Ben-Gurion abandoned it. The belief in a compromise solution, which Ben-Gurion professed for the seven years between 1929 and 1936, was also a tactic, designed to win continued British support for Zionism. The only genuine convictions that underlay Ben-Gurion's approach to the Arab question were two: that the support of the power that rules Palestine was more important to Zionism than any agreement with the Arabs, and that the Arabs would reconcile themselves to the Jewish presence only after they conceded their inability to destroy it.

For Ben-Gurion, any agreement with the Palestinian Arabs should be based on Arab acquiescence to Zionist hegemony. That would result from Arab recognition of Zionist power and Arab weakness. In talks with Arabs in the 1930s Ben-Gurion tried to impress Jewish strength on them, e.g. by calling for a Jewish state including Transjordan.

==== Weizmann's position ====
In Chaim Weizmann's view, Palestine was a Jewish and not an Arab country; however, Weizmann believed that the state had to be based on justice and on an accommodation with the Arabs.

In 1918, Weizmann toured Palestine as head of the Zionist Commission and met with Arab and Palestinian–Arab leaders, including the future mufti al-Husseini. He preferred to negotiate a political solution primarily with the British, and sometimes with non-Palestinian Arabs, but he opposed negotiating with the Palestinians themselves. According to Jehuda Reinharz, he focused his efforts on the Pan-Arab leadership of the Hussein family because they were (initially) willing to reach an accommodation in return for Zionist support while he failed to reach any understanding with Palestinian Arab leaders.

Weizmann rejected the idea that population transfer of Palestinians to other Arab countries was immoral (Under the 1923 Treaty of Lausanne, Turks and Greeks had agreed a mutual transfer arrangement). According to Flapan, this idea was in the back of his mind, although he didn't say this in public. In 1930 he did however urge the British to consider transfer of Palestinians to Transjordan.

According to Flapan, Weizmann preferred to negotiate a political solution primarily with the British, and sometimes with non-Palestinian Arabs, but he opposed negotiating a solution with the Palestinians themselves. In the early 1920s he came out vehemently against the attempts of Judah Leon Magnes to mediate with the Arabs. Magnes' proposal included a Palestinian state to be established with proportional voting. Weizmann was vehemently opposed to the setting up of representative institutions in Palestine. According to Gorny, Weizmann "did not regard the Palestinian Arabs as partners in negotiations on the future of Palestine".

According to Arthur Ruppin, formerly in charge of the Jewish Agency, Weizmann and other Zionist leaders failed to grasp the nature and importance of the Arab question. Ruppin told the Agency in May 1936:

Dr Weizmann once told me how he received the Balfour Declaration. And when I asked him, 'And what did you think then in reality on the Arab question?' he replied, 'The English told us that [there are] some hundred of thousands [of] blacks there, and this has no importance.' This shows me that at that time our leaders didn't have a clue regarding the Arab question, and even much later they relegated this question to the margins.

==== Jabotinsky's position ====
Ze'ev Jabotinsky, the leader of the Revisionist Zionists, thought the Arabs were completely irrelevant to the question of Zionism except as enemies. In his view, the conflict with the Arabs was natural and inevitable and could not be solved until the Zionists could face the Arabs with an "iron wall" of Jewish power. Nevertheless, Jabotinsky supported equal rights for Arabs living in the Jewish state.

==== Bi-national statehood concept ====
A minority of Zionists, including the Socialist Zionist movement Hashomer Hatzair, sought to create a bi-national state. However, this approach was unpopular with both Arabs and Jews.

==== The "Transfer Idea" ====
The "transfer idea" refers to Zionist thinking about the possibility of transfer of Palestinian Arabs out of Palestine, or a future Jewish part of Palestine, for the benefit of the goals of Zionism. Zionist organisations discussed it plenary in relation to the 1937 Peel recommendations. In the historical debate since the 1980s it has often been discussed in relation to the 1948 Palestinian expulsion and flight. Proponents of this theory say that the driving force of the 1948 Palestinian exodus was the Zionist leaders' belief that a Jewish state could not survive with a strong Arab population and that a population transfer would be most beneficial.

According to Israeli historian Benny Morris, "many if not most of Zionism's mainstream leaders expressed at least passing support for the idea of transfer during the movement's first decades. True, as the subject was sensitive they did not often or usually state this in public." Israeli historian and former diplomat Shlomo Ben-Ami wrote: "The philosophy of transfer was not a marginal, esoteric article in the mindset and thinking of the main leaders of the Yishuv."

According to Gorny, in the traditional view of most Zionists a mass exodus of Palestinian Arabs was a desirable solution of the "Arab Question".

Norman Finkelstein argues that transferist thinking is close to the core of Zionist thinking. He says the Zionist claim of a prevalent right to all of Palestine, combined with its desire to establish a society that "belonged" to the Jews resulted in "a radically exclusivist ideology, which renders non-Jews at best a redundant presence and easily lends itself to schemes favoring population transfer—and expulsion." Thus, "Zionism's claim to the whole of Palestine ... called into question any Arab presence in Palestine."

Theodor Herzl supported the transfer idea. Land in Palestine was to be gently expropriated from the Palestinian Arabs and they were to be worked across the border "unbemerkt" (surreptitiously), e.g. by refusing them employment. Herzl's draft of a charter for a Jewish-Ottoman Land Company (JOLC) gave the JOLC the right to obtain land in Palestine by giving its owners comparable land elsewhere in the Ottoman Empire. According to Walid Khalidi this indicates Herzl's "bland assumption of the transfer of the Palestinian to make way for the immigrant colonist."

According to Nur Masalha, "the defeat of the partition plan in no way diminished the determination of the Ben-Gurion camp ... to continue working for the removal of the native population" In November 1937, a Population Transfer Committee was appointed to investigate the practicalities of transfer. It discussed details of the costs, specific places for relocation of the Palestinians, and the order in which they should be transferred. In view of the need for land, it concluded that the rural population should be transferred before the townspeople, and that a village by village manner would be best. In June 1938, Ben-Gurion summed up the mood in the JAE: "I support compulsory transfer. I do not see anything immoral in it". Regarding the unwillingness of the British to implement it, land expropriation was seen as a major mechanism to precipitate a Palestinian exodus. Also, the remaining Palestinians should not be left with substantial landholdings.

The role of the "Transfer Idea" in the 1948 Palestinian expulsion and flight is controversial. Although it is nowadays widely acknowledged by historians that Jewish military attacks were the main cause of the exodus, it is still debated whether or not there was an unofficial policy to this end. The "transfer thinking" in the Yishuv prior to 1948 may have played a role during the military planning process and also in the attitude of military leaders and soldiers towards Palestinians during the war.

=== Palestinian Arab positions ===
The Palestinian Arab leadership based their requests to the British for national and political rights like representative government on several arguments:

- Together with Iraq, Syria and Lebanon, Palestine was a Class A Mandate of the League of Nations. Class A mandates were areas deemed, according to Article 22 of the Covenant of the League of Nations, to "...have reached a stage of development where their existence as independent nations can be provisionally recognized subject to the rendering of administrative advice and assistance by a Mandatory until such time as they are able to stand alone. The wishes of these communities must be a principal consideration in the selection of the Mandatory." By 1932 Iraq was independent, and Syria, Lebanon and Transjordan had national parliaments, Arab government officials up to the rank of minister, and substantial power in Arabs hands.
- British promises during World War I. The McMahon–Hussein Correspondence had promised Arab self-determination in purely Arab areas. However McMahon had kept it deliberately vague whether Palestine was part of these areas.

==== Rejection of Jewish Yishuv and Jihad ====
The Islamic religious thought also had an influence on Palestinian positions, especially during the 1930s, leading to religious interpretation of the struggle against the British and the Jewish Yishuv. Among Islamists the issue was the application of Dar al-Islam for Palestine, as a term by Muslim scholars to refer to those countries where Muslims can practice their religion as the ruling sect and where certain religions (Judaism, Christianity, and Sabianism) are to be tolerated. Though the idea of defensive Jihad became popular among some Palestinian militants in the 1980s, the role model for this phenomenon appeared as early as the 1930s, with early Islamic militant groups such as the Black Hand (led by Syrian Islamist Izaddin al-Qassam) aiming to liberate Palestine from Christians and Jews within the context of Jihad.

==== Amin al-Husseini ====
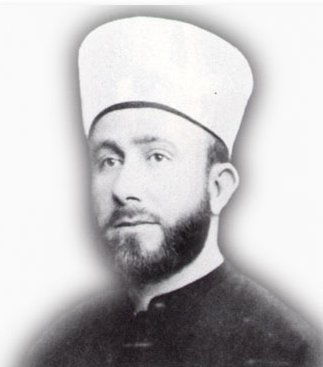
Mohammad Amin al-Husayni

Robert Fisk, discussing the difficulties of describing al-Husseini's life and its motivations, summarized the problem in the following way:

(M)erely to discuss his life is to be caught up in the Arab–Israeli propaganda war. To make an impartial assessment of the man's career—or, for that matter, an unbiased history of the Arab–Israeli dispute—is like trying to ride two bicycles at the same time.

Philip Mattar suggests that in 1939 al-Husseini should have accepted the favorable White Paper of 1939, or compromise with the Zionists. But the Mufti adapted a strategy of active and futile opposition and rejection, which contributed to the ultimate defeat of the Palestinians.

Peter Novick has argued that the post-war historiographical depiction of al-Husseini reflected complex geopolitical interests that distorted the record.

The claims of Palestinian complicity in the murder of the European Jews were to some extent a defensive strategy, a preemptive response to the Palestinian complaint that if Israel was recompensed for the Holocaust, it was unjust that Palestinian Muslims should pick up the bill for the crimes of European Christians. The assertion that Palestinians were complicit in the Holocaust was mostly based on the case of the Mufti of Jerusalem, a pre-World War II Palestinian nationalist leader who, to escape imprisonment by the British, sought refuge during the war in Germany. The Mufti was in many ways a disreputable character, but post-war claims that he played any significant part in the Holocaust have never been sustained. This did not prevent the editors of the four-volume Encyclopedia of the Holocaust from giving him a starring role. The article on the Mufti is more than twice as long as the articles on Goebbels and Göring, longer than the articles on Himmler and Heydrich combined, longer than the article on Eichmann—of all the biographical articles, it is exceeded in length, but only slightly, by the entry for Hitler.

Gilbert Achcar sums up al-Husseini's significance:

One must note in passing that Amin al-Husseini's memoirs are an antidote against Holocaust denial: He knew that the genocide took place and boasted of having been perfectly aware of it from 1943 on. I believe he is an architect of the Nakba (the defeat of 1948 and the departure of hundreds of thousands of Palestinians who had been driven out of their lands) in the sense that he bears a share of responsibility for what has happened to the Palestinian people.

==== Links with Nazi Germany ====
In 1933, within weeks of Hitler's rise to power in Germany, the German Consul-General in Palestine, Heinrich Wolff, sent a telegram to Berlin reporting al-Husseini's belief that Palestinian Muslims were enthusiastic about the new regime and looked forward to the spread of Fascism throughout the region. Wolff met al-Husseini and many sheikhs again, a month later, at Nabi Musa. They expressed their approval of the anti-Jewish boycott in Germany and asked Wolff not to send any Jews to Palestine.

The Mufti collaborated with the Germans in numerous sabotage and commando operations in Iraq, Transjordan, and Palestine, and repeatedly urged the Germans to bomb Tel Aviv and Jerusalem 'in order to injure Palestinian Jewry and for propaganda purposes in the Arab world', as his Nazi interlocutors put it. The proposals were rejected as unfeasible. The Italian Fascists envisaged a project to establish him as head of an intelligence centre in North Africa, and he agreed to act as commander of both regular and irregular forces in a future unit flanking Axis troops to carry out sabotage operations behind enemy lines. Operation ATLAS was one such joint operation.

==== Nashashibi clan ====
The Nashashibi family was considered to be politically moderate compared to the more militant views of the Husayni family. The Nashashibis favoured political, rather than violent, opposition to the British mandate and Zionism. They were also willing to compromise in some areas that many Palestinians were not. For example, the Nashashibi family favoured the partition proposed by Britain in 1937 and reservedly accepted the 1939 White Paper, though they backtracked when attacked by political opponents. Similarly, the Nashashibi also favoured Arab participation in the Legislative Council proposed by the British mandate, which would feature representatives of the various religious groups in Palestine at the time.

Raghib Nashashibi, the head of the Nashashibi clan at the time, was an influential political figure throughout the British Mandate period, and beyond. He was appointed Mayor of Jerusalem in 1920 by the British, and helped form the Palestinian Arab National Party in 1928 and the National Defence Party in 1934. In 1936, he joined to the Arab Higher Committee, formed on the initiative of Amin al-Husayni, of the rival al-Husayni clan; however, Raghib and the clan-controlled National Defence Party soon withdrew from the committee.

Generally, the Nashashibi family and their political followers advocated compromise with Zionists and the British authorities. This fell in stark contrast to the views of the Husaynis, who advocated a total rejection of the Balfour Declaration policy. The Palestine Arab Party, formed in 1935 by the Husayni's in response to the formation of Nashashibi's National Defense Party, believed in the maximalist dissolution of the Jewish National Home and creation of a solely Arab government. The Nashashibis, however, felt that Arabs were most likely to achieve their political goals by working within the Mandate system, rather than fighting against it.

Throughout the British mandate period, the Husayni and Nashashibi clans were the two most powerful Arab families in Palestine and they constantly competed for power. While the two families did not differ on their long-term goals (stopping the influx of European Jews and preserving the Arab Palestinian state), they disagreed on the best way to achieve those goals. The Husayni family rejected the British mandate and Zionism as a whole, while the Nashashibis felt that the best approach was through political compromise.

Politics in Palestine as a whole largely diverged along the rift created by these two families. This produced a level of factionalism among Palestinian Arabs that often crippled them in fighting Zionism. Additionally, partisan bickering often resulted in one family blocking the policies of the other family that genuinely may have been in the national interest. Unfortunately for Palestinian Arabs, their ability to effectively negotiate was often hindered by their inability to present a united front on the issue of Zionism.

==== Pro-Zionist parties ====
In 1920, the pro-Zionist Muslim National Associations was established by the mayor of Haifa, Hassan Bey Shukri and Sheikh Musa Hadeib, head of the farmers' party of Mt. Hebron. In July 1921, Shukri sent a telegram to the British government, declaring support for the Balfour Declaration and Jewish immigration to British Mandate Palestine:

We strongly protest against the attitude of the said delegation concerning the Zionist question. We do not consider the Jewish people as an enemy whose wish is to crush us. On the contrary. We consider the Jews as a brotherly people sharing our joys and troubles and helping us in the construction of our common country.

As'ad Shukeiri, a pro-Zionist Muslim scholar (‘alim) of the Acre area widely known for his opposition to the Palestinian Arab national movement, followed the same tendency. He met routinely with Zionist officials and had a part in pro-Zionist Arab organizations, publicly rejecting Haj Amin al-Husseini's use of Islam against Zionism.

== Social and economic separation ==
=== Zionism's 'Conquest of Labour' ===
In 1932 Ben-Gurion wrote:

We who came here over the past fifty years could not be absorbed in the economy existing, but were obliged to create new sources of livelihood. We did not settle in Arab villages or in the occupied towns, but founded new settlements and build new urban quarters and suburbs. We did not look for work in Arab vineyards and groves, nor in Arab shops and factories; we planted and erected our own. We came not as immigrants but as settlers, not to ancient Palestine, but to a new land we made ourselves.

The struggle for 'Jewish labour', for Jews to employ only Jews, signified the victory of Jewish labour in creating a new society. This struggle was constantly pushed by the leaders of the second Aliyah (1904–1914), who founded labour Zionism and in the 1930s became the leaders of the Zionist movement. Shortly after his arrival in Palestine in 1906 Ben-Gurion noted that a moshava, a private Jewish agricultural settlement, employed Arabs as guards. He asked himself: "Was it conceivable that here too we should be deep in Galuth (exile), hiring strangers to guard our property and protect our lives?". Soon Ben-Gurion and his companions managed to amend this situation. According to Teveth in these early years Ben-Gurion developed the concept of 'Avodah Ivrit', or 'Jewish labour'.

The leaders of the second Aliyah agreed that Jewish labour was vital for the national revival process as they were convinced that Jews should 'redeem' themselves by building with their own hands a new type of Jewish society. They also thought the use of Arab labour could create a typical colonial society, exploiting cheap, unorganised indigenous labour, and would hamper further Jewish immigration. Finally they considered manual labour a good therapy for Jews as individuals and as a people. In Ben-Gurion's opinion Jewish labour was "not a means but a sublime end", the Jew had to be transformed and made creative.

In 1907, Ben-Gurion called for Jewish labour on lands owned by the Jewish National Fund. There were difficulties here, because Arabs were prepared to work long hours for very low wages, and most Jewish immigrants preferred to settle in the cities. In this context occurred the development of the concept of the Kibbutz, 'the co-operative settlement based on self-labour and motivated by Zionist ideals'. In a summary made in 1956 Ben-Gurion said the Kibuutz movement was not started because of some socialist theory, but as an effective way to "guarantee Jewish labour".

Around 1920, Ben-Gurion began to call for Jewish labour in the entire economy, and labour Zionism started striving for an absolute segregation of the Jewish and Arab national communities. In this way 'Jews and Arabs ... would live in separate settlements and work in separate economies'. Ben-Gurion used the 1929 riots and the 1936 general strike as opportunities to further enforce his drive for Jewish labour. In 1930 the Hope Simpson Report blamed the Jewish labour policy for the grave unemployment in the Arab sector. According to Flapan in 1933 the Histadrut launched its first campaign to remove Arab workers from the cities. In many cases the removal of Arab workers 'took the form of ugly scenes of violence'. Reports of this in the Jewish and Arab press 'created an atmosphere of unprecedented tension'. According to Flapan this forceful eviction of Arab workers and the 'acrimonious propaganda' which accompanied the operation amplified Arab hostility and ultimately precipitated the outbreak of the Arab revolt in 1936.

In 1947, the UN Special Commission on Palestine summarized the situation:

The economic life presents the complex phenomenon of two distinctive economies—one Jewish and one Arab, closely involved with one another and yet in essential features separate. ... Apart from a small number of experts, no Jewish workers are employed in Arab undertakings and apart from citrus groves, very few Arabs are employed in Jewish enterprises ... Government service, the Potash company and the oil refinery are almost the only places where Arab and Jews meet as co-workers in the same organization. ... There are considerable differences between the rates of wage for Arab and Jewish workers in similar occupations.

== The conflict (1921–1948) ==
From the Zionist point of view the Arabs would naturally object to Zionism, but that was a problem for the British to solve, and not for the Jews. As the terms of the mandate required, the British should keep the Arabs from becoming a political or even a military threat to Zionist goals. Therefore, for the Zionists British policy was more important than Arab policy.

Arab opposition was of course known to the Zionists. Ben-Gurion said in 1918: "We as a nation want this country to be ours; the Arabs, as a nation, want this country to be theirs". Resistance was to be expected. Jabotinsky said in 1921: "I don't know of a single example in history where a country was colonised with the courteous consent of the population".

According to Flapan, one of the basic concepts of mainstream Zionism with regard to the Arab Palestinians was economic, social and cultural segregation as a means to create a Jewish national life. Especially the struggle for "100 per cent of Jewish labour" in the Jewish sector of the economy occupied the energies of the labour movement for most of the Mandatory years and contributed more than any other factor to the territorial, economic and social separation between Jews and Arabs.' According to C. D. Smith the Zionists did not intend to create a joint society with the Arabs, no matter how difficult this might be.

Although the establishment of a Jewish majority or a Jewish state in Palestine was fundamentally at odds with the aspirations of the Arab inhabitants of Palestine, Zionists did not doubt their right to establish a Jewish majority in Palestine. Zionists justified this by referring to the 'unique' historical bond of the Jewish nation with Palestine, while the Arabs of Palestine were part of the Arab nation and therefore had no special bond with Palestine. Many Zionists claimed a 'preemptive right' to Palestine, the Jews had a right as a Nation, the Arabs only as individuals.

=== 1921 Jaffa riots ===
In May 1921, riots broke out in Jaffa, particularly around the Red House whose inhabitants were massacred. The riots were initially triggered by a May Day clash between the Mopsim and Ahdut HaAvoda, but quickly led to clashes between Jews and Arabs. 95 people were killed and 219 injured. As a consequence of the events, thousands of Jewish residents fled from Jaffa to Tel Aviv. A climate of mutual suspicious and hatred arose and grew.

=== 1921–1929 ===
In 1922, the British offered the Arabs to be represented in an official council. This council would exist of the High Commissioner and ten government officials, eight Muslims, two Jews and two Christians. The latter twelve would be elected by the population. However both Muslim and Christian Arabs decided to boycott the elections because the council was specifically denied the right to discuss matters pertaining to Jewish immigration. In 1923 and later Herbert Samuel proposed councils with equal compositions but with their members appointed by the High Commissioner. The Arabs refused again.

According to C. D. Smith, for Arabs to accept would have meant a recognition of the Balfour Declaration, the mandate, which included the Balfour Declaration, and consequently a Jewish right to immigration, which would undermine their claim of self-determination.

=== 1929 riots ===
Religious tensions over the Western Wall, an international economic crisis and nationalist tensions over Jewish immigration led to the 1929 Palestine riots. In these religious-nationalist riots, Jews were massacred in Hebron and the survivors were expelled from the town. Devastation also took place in Safed and Jerusalem. This violence was mainly directed against the non-Zionist orthodox communities; Zionist communities were able to defend themselves and had established defence organizations. As a result, the orthodox community in Palestine was increasingly dependent on Zionist support.

According to C. D. Smith the British adherence to the terms of the mandate meant that there was no political way for the Palestinian Arabs to counter the loss of their country. "Eventually violence became the only recourse."

=== Black Hand and 1933 riots ===
The organization was founded in 1930 and led until the death of Syrian-born Sheikh Izz ad-Din al-Qassam in 1935, whose preaching was instrumental in laying the foundations for the formation of the Black Hand, which he used to proclaim jihad and attack Jewish settlers. By 1935, Black Hand had several hundred men - the figures differ from 200 to 800 - organised in cells of 5 men, and arranged military training for peasants. The cells were equipped with bombs and firearms, which they used to raid Jewish settlements and sabotage British-constructed rail lines.

=== The Arab Revolt ===
==== Boycott and revolt ====
The 1936–1939 Arab revolt in Palestine was influenced by the Qassamite rebellion which broke out following the killing of Izz ad-Din al-Qassam in 1935, as well as a declaration issued by the Grand Mufti of Jerusalem, Amin al-Husseini on 16 May 1930 calling for the date to be commemorated as 'Palestine Day', in addition to calling for a general strike to begin on the same day.

The general strike which broke out lasted from April to October 1936, when it was called off by the Higher Arab Committee (HAC). The revolt which followed consisted of two distinct phases. The first phase was directed primarily by the primarily urban HAC and was focused mainly on strikes and other forms of political protest. By October 1936, these efforts had been quashed by the British administration using a combination of political concessions, international diplomacy (involving the rulers of Iraq, Saudi Arabia, Transjordan and Yemen) and the threat of martial law. In response, the second phase of the revolt started to emerge late in 1937, in which Arab guerillas operating primarily from the countryside increasingly targeted British forces. In response, the British outlawed the HAC, arresting many of its members, and went on the offensive; British forces pushed into rebel strongholds and "virtually annihilated them" after coercing the rural population into collaborating with them. Punishments were liberally meted out to rebels and suspected accomplices, with the British utilizing a combination of house demolitions, crop burnings and mass imprisonment. By summer 1939, the British, assisted by the Haganah, had largely suppressed the revolt.

According to government sources, over the course of the revolt 2,000 Arabs were killed in combat with the British, 108 were hanged, and 961 died because of what was termed in the reports as "gang and terrorist activities". In an analysis of British government statistics, historian Walid Khalidi estimates 19,792 casualties for the Arabs, with 5,032 dead: 3,832 killed by the British and 1,200 dead because of involvement in "terrorism", and 14,760 wounded. Over ten percent of the adult male Palestinian Arab population between 20 and 60 was killed, wounded, imprisoned or exiled during the revolt, while estimates of the number of Palestinian Jews killed range from 91 to several hundred.

The Arab revolt in Palestine was unsuccessful, and its consequences affected the outcome of the 1947–1949 Palestine war. It led to the British administration giving crucial support to Zionist paramilitaries such as the Haganah, whereas on the Palestinian Arab side, the revolt forced Amin al-Husseini, the main Palestinian Arab leader of the period to flee into exile along with his associates.

==== Peel commission ====
In 1937, in a reaction to a half year revolt by Palestinian Arabs, the British Peel Commission proposed partition as a solution of the problems. The commission recommended that the Jews should get about twenty percent of Palestine, and that the 250,000 Palestinian Arabs living in this part should be transferred. According to the plan "in the last resort" the transfer of Arabs from the Jewish part would be compulsory. According to Masalha the transfer part of the plan had been suggested to the Peel commission by a Zionist lobby.

The Zionist leadership was inclined to accept the partition part of the plan under the condition of the transfer part. David Ben-Gurion accepted it 'on the basis of the assumption that after we build up a strong force following the establishment of the state, we will abolish the partition of the country and we will expand to the whole Land of Israel'

At the twentieth Zionist Congress, held in Zurich in August 1937, the plan was discussed and rejected on the ground that a larger part of Palestine should be assigned to them. The 'in the last resort' compulsory transfer was accepted as morally just by a majority although many doubted its feasibility. Partition however was not acceptable for many.

The immediately succeeding Woodhead Commission, called to "examine the Peel Commission plan in detail and to recommend an actual partition plan". The Woodhead Commission considered three different plans, one of which was based on the Peel plan. Reporting in 1938, the Commission rejected the Peel plan primarily on the grounds that it could not be implemented without a massive forced transfer of Arabs (an option that the British government had already ruled out). With dissent from some of its members, the Commission instead recommended a plan that would leave the Galilee under British mandate, but emphasised serious problems with it that included a lack of financial self-sufficiency of the proposed Arab State. The British Government accompanied the publication of the Woodhead Report by a statement of policy rejecting partition as impracticable due to "political, administrative and financial difficulties".

==== 1939 White Paper ====
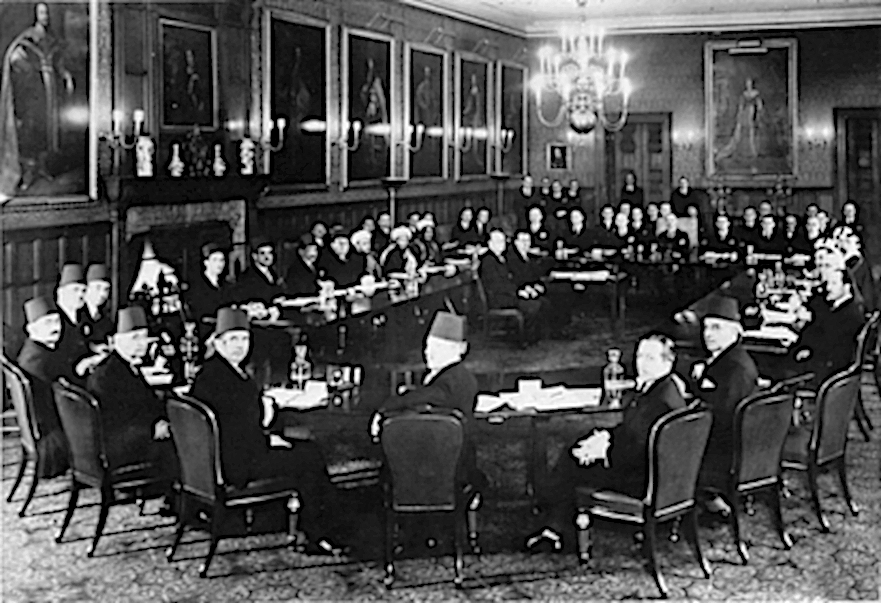
London Conference, St. James's Palace, February 1939. Arab Palestinian delegates (foreground), Left to right: Fu'ad Saba, Yaqub Al-Ghussein, Musa Al-Alami, Amin Tamimi, Jamal Al-Husseini, Awni Abd al-Hadi, George Antonius, and Alfred Roch. Facing the Arab Palestinians are the British, with Sir Neville Chamberlain presiding. To his right is Lord Halifax, and to his left, Malcolm MacDonald

The White Paper of 1939 was a policy paper issued by the British government under Neville Chamberlain in response to the 1936–1939 Arab revolt in Palestine. (It was also known as the MacDonald White Paper after Malcolm MacDonald, the British Colonial Secretary who presided over its creation.) The paper called for the establishment of a Jewish national home in an independent Palestinian state within 10 years, rejecting the idea of the creation of a Jewish state and the idea of partitioning Palestine. It also limited Jewish immigration to 75,000 for 5 years, and ruled that further immigration was to be determined by the Arab majority (section II). Restrictions were put on the rights of Jews to buy land from Arabs (section III). Further, it promised that only with Palestinian support would Britain allow Jewish state. This greatly upset Zionists because of the increasing persecution of Jews in Europe at the onset of World War II, particularly in Germany.

The White Paper was published as Cmd 6019. It was approved by the House of Commons on 23 May 1939 by 268 votes to 179.

=== During WWII (1939–1945) ===
The 1942 Zionist conference could not be held because of the war. Instead 600 Jewish leaders (not just Zionists) met in a hotel in the Biltmore Hotel in New York and adopted a statement known as the Biltmore Program. They agreed that when the war ended all Jewish organizations would fight to ensure free Jewish migration into Mandatory Palestine.

The Biltmore Program called for "Palestine [to] be established as a Jewish Commonwealth". David Ben-Gurion, who dominated the conference, formulated the Zionists' demand 'not as a Jewish state in Palestine but as Palestine as a Jewish state'. It was significant in that all US Jewish organizations were now united in agreement on the need for a Jewish state in Palestine.

From the beginning of the forties the Zionist movement stopped paying attention to the 'Arab question'. The reason is that it was expected that any solution, whether a Jewish state in all of Palestine, partition, or an international protectorate, would have to be imposed on the Palestinian Arabs by force, because of their refusal to compromise. According to Teveth a war was 'made inevitable after the Biltmore Plan of 1942 declared Zionism's explicit aim to be a Jewish state, which the Arabs were determined to oppose by force.'

== Belligerents ==
=== Zionist para-military organizations ===
==== Haganah ====
After the Jaffa Riots, an organization of Jewish Legion veterans was created, Haganah (Defence) to defend Jewish communities against rioters.

==== Irgun ====
In 1931, following the Revisionist Zionist departure from the Zionist Movement, a group of revisionists left Haganah and founded the Irgun Tzvai Leumi (National Military Organization), also known as Etzel.

=== Arab para-militaries ===
==== Fasa'il ====
At least 282 rebel leaders took part in the Arab Revolt, including four Christians. Rebel forces consisted of loosely organized bands known as fasa'il (sing: fasil). The leader of a fasil was known as a qa'id al-fasil (pl. quwwa'id al-fasa'il), which means "band commander". The Jewish press often referred to them as "brigands", while the British authorities and media called them "bandits", "terrorists", "rebels" or "insurgents", but never "nationalists". Ursabat (meaning "gangs") was another Arabic term used for the rebels, and it spawned the British soldiers' nickname for all rebels, which was Oozlebart.

According to historian Simon Anglim, the rebel groups were divided into general categories: mujahadeen and fedayeen. The former were guerrillas who engaged in armed confrontations, while the latter committed acts of sabotage. According to later accounts of some surviving rebel leaders from the Galilee, the mujahideen maintained little coordination with the nominal hierarchy of the revolt. Most ambushes were the result of a local initiative undertaken by a qa'id or a group of quwwa'id from the same area.

==== Peace bands ====
The "peace bands" (fasa'il al-salam) or "Nashashibi units" were made up of disaffected Arab peasants recruited by the British administration and the Nashashibis in late 1938 to battle against Arab rebels during the revolt. Despite their peasant origins the bands were representative mainly of the interests of landlords and rural notables. Some peace bands also sprang up in the Nablus area, on Mount Carmel (a stronghold of the Druze who largely opposed the rebellion after 1937), and around Nazareth without connection to the Nashashibi-Husayni power struggle.

== Aftermath ==
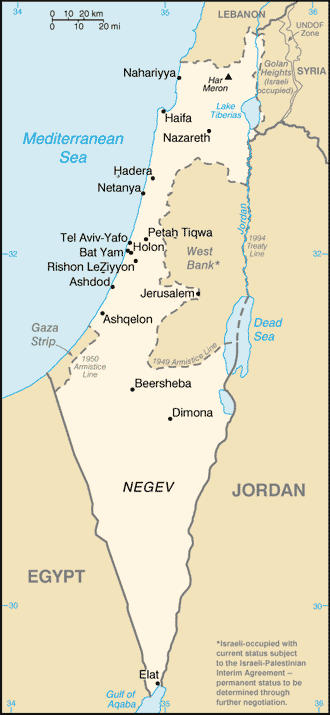
Land in the lighter shade represents territory within the borders of Israel at the conclusion of the 1948 war. This land is internationally recognized as belonging to Israel.

== See also ==
- Zionism – World Zionist Organization – List of Zionists – Labor Zionism – Revisionist Zionism
- Palestinian nationalism
- Mandatory Palestine – Herbert Samuel
- Zionist political violence – Palestinian political violence
- History of Zionism – Timeline of Zionism – History of Palestine – History of Israel
- Jewish Autonomism

== Bibliography ==
- Achcar, Gilbert (2010b). The Arabs and the Holocaust: The Arab-Israeli War of Narratives. Henry Holt and Company. ISBN 978-1-429-93820-4.
- Elpeleg, Zvi (2007) [First published 1993]. Himmelstein, Shmuel (ed.). The Grand Mufti: Haj Amin Al-Hussaini, Founder of the Palestinian National Movement. (trans. David Harvey). Routledge. ISBN 978-0-714-63432-6.
- Finkelstein, Norman (2003). Image and Reality of the Israel–Palestine Conflict, 2nd Ed. Verso. ISBN 978-1-85984-442-7
- Fisk, Robert (2006). The Great War for Civilisation: The Conquest of the Middle East. HarperPerennial. ISBN 978-1-84115-008-6.
- Flapan, Simha, 1979, Zionism and the Palestinians, Croom Helm London, ISBN 978-0-85664-499-3,
- Gorny, Yosef, 1987, Zionism and the Arabs, 1882–1948, Clarendon Press, ISBN 978-0-19-822721-2
- Katz, Shmuel (1973) Battleground: Fact and Fantasy in Palestine Shapolsky Pub; ISBN 978-0-933503-03-8
- Khalidi, Walid (1961). Plan Dalet, Master Plan for the Conquest of Palestine. Middle East Forum, November 1961.
- Lewis, Bernard (1997) [First published 1995]. The Middle East: A Brief History of the Last 2,000 Years. Simon and Schuster. ISBN 978-0-684-83280-7.
- Lockman, Zachary (1996). Comrades and Enemies: Arab and Jewish Workers in Palestine, 1906–1948. Berkeley, Los Angeles & London: University of California Press. ISBN 978-0-520-20419-5.
- Morris, Benny (2004). The Birth of the Palestinian Refugee Problem Revisited. Cambridge: Cambridge University Press. ISBN 978-0-521-00967-6
- Masalha, Nur (1992). Expulsion of the Palestinians: The Concept of "Transfer" in Zionist Political Thought, 1882–1948. Beirut: Institute for Palestine Studies. ISBN 978-0-88728-235-5
- Nicosia, Francis R. (2000). The Third Reich and the Palestine Question. Transaction Publishers. ISBN 978-0-7658-0624-6.
- Novick, Peter (2000). The Holocaust in American Life. Houghton Mifflin Harcourt. ISBN 978-0-618-08232-2.
- Pappé, Ilan (2006). The Ethnic Cleansing of Palestine. Oxford: One World Books. (2006) ISBN 978-1-85168-467-0
- Segev, Tom (2000). One Palestine, Complete: Jews and Arabs Under the British Mandate. Translated by Watzman, Haim. London: Henry Holt and Company. ISBN 978-0-8050-4848-3.
- Shapira, Anita, 1992, Land and Power; The Zionist Recourse to Force, 1881–1948, Oxford U. Press, N.Y., ISBN 978-0-19-506104-8
- Smith, Charles D., 2001, Palestine and the Arab–Israeli Conflict, 4th ed., ISBN 978-0-312-20828-8
- Sternhell, Zeev (1999). The Founding Myths of Israel: Nationalism, Socialism, and the Making of the Jewish State. Princeton University Press. ISBN 978-0-691-00967-4
- Teveth, Shabtai, 1985, Ben-Gurion and the Palestinian Arabs, Oxford University Press, ISBN 978-0-19-503562-9
- Yahil, Leni; Friedman, Ina; Galai, Haya (1991). The Holocaust: The Fate of European Jewry, 1932–1945. Oxford University Press. ISBN 978-0-19-504523-9.
- Zertal, Idith (2005). Israel's Holocaust and the Politics of Nationhood. Cambridge University Press. ISBN 978-0-521-85096-4.
