= Mordechai Olmert =

Israeli politician (1908–1998)

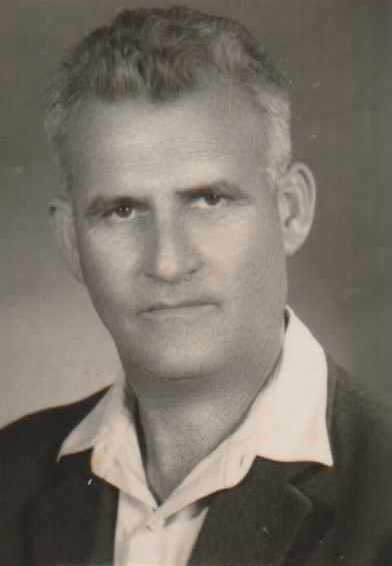

Faction represented in the Knesset
- 1955–1961: Herut

Personal details
- Born: 16 January 1908 Buguruslan, Russian Empire
- Died: 30 March 1998 (aged 90)

Mordechai Olmert (Hebrew: מרדכי אולמרט; 16 January 1908 – 30 March 1998) was an Israeli politician who served as a member of the Knesset for Herut between 1955 and 1961. He was also the father of Ehud Olmert, who served as Prime Minister between 2006 and 2009.

== Life and career ==
Born in Buguruslan in the Russian Empire, Olmert's family moved to Harbin in China in 1919. He studied at a local polytechnic, and was amongst the founders of the Jewish Students Organisation and the local branch of Betar. During this time he met Bella Wagman, who he later married. Between 1931 and 1933 he taught Russian at a Chinese high school, before making aliyah to Mandatory Palestine in 1933.

He joined the Betar work group in Hadera, and worked as an agricultural labourer until 1939. He was amongst the founders of the Irgun, as well as the Jabotinsky neighbourhood in Binyamina in 1946. He survived an attack on a bus by Arab militants in November 1947.

In 1949 he returned to China as an emissary for the Irgun fund. He returned to Israel to head Herut's settlement department, where he remained until 1953. A member of the party's central committee, he was elected to the Knesset on its list in 1955, and was re-elected in 1959. He lost his seat in the 1961 elections, and in 1965 left the party's central committee. In 1969 he joined the Free Centre, and was a founder of La'am in 1976.

He died in 1998 at the age of 90. His son Ehud Olmert reported that Mordechai's last words were in Mandarin Chinese.
