= Murder of youths in Ra'anana by British soldiers =

British attack on Jewish Youth in Raanana, Israel

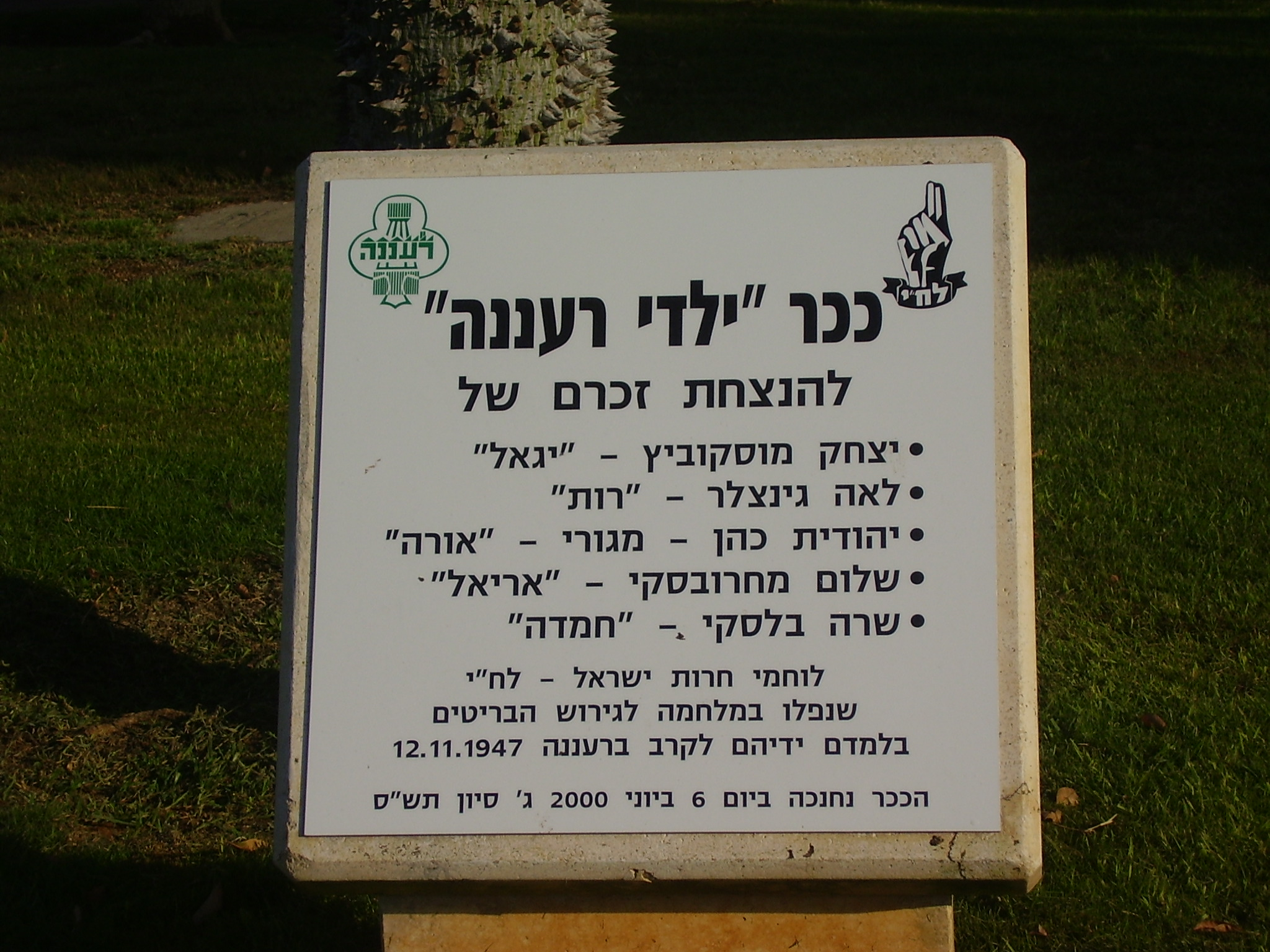
Memorial for Lehi youth killed by British in Raanana (1947)

On 12 November 1947 (29th of Cheshvan, 5758), two weeks before the United Nations voted to recommended partitioning Palestine into Jewish and Arab states as per the United Nations Partition Plan for Palestine in UN General Assembly Resolution 181, British soldiers attacked a house in Ra'anana where a Lehi training course for young people was being held. Four trainees aged 16–18 and their 19-year-old instructor were murdered during the attack.

== Background ==
In the 1930s and 1940s, Ra'anana was a settlement with about 2,000 residents who primarily identified with the Yishuv and the Haganah institutions.

After the murder of Avraham Stern, the founder of the Lehi, by the British colonial police in 1942, Yehoshua Cohen, another member of the Lehi movement, continued its activities while hiding in the surrounding orchards. In 1943 when Yitzhak Shamir escaped from the Mizra'a detention camp where British authorities had imprisoned him in 1941, he met with Cohen in these orchards and together they reorganized the movement into cells and trained its members.

In an orchard on the Ra'anana-Herzliya border, there stood a lonely house that Lehi members rented for training young people in firearm use. In November 1947, a training course known as the "Ra'anana's Children's Course" was conducted. The young people learned to disassemble and assemble various weapons. There were 9 young people aged 16–18 and their 19-year-old commander.

== The attack ==
On the morning of 12 November 1947, an observer noticed dozens of British soldiers approaching the house and shouted: "Gentiles", "Anemones". The youngsters tried to escape through the windows, and did not fire at the soldiers but nonetheless, the soldiers opened with heavy fire and mowed them down. The fire killed 3 young women Sarah Belsky (1929–1947), Leah Ginzler (1931–1947), and Yehudit Cohen-Megori (1932–1947), their friend Shalom Makharovsky (1931–1947), and their commander Yitzhak Moskowitz (1928–1947).

Four others were captured, taken into custody, and later sentenced to life imprisonment. Yosef Shalem (b. 1931) was one of these. At the trial, Yosef stated: "We are warriors of the freedom of Israel, we will not be held accountable by the enemy of our people. We will pass judgement – only before Hebrew judges of the independent Hebrew people. We will not participate in this wretched show in which vile murderers dressed in imperialist military uniforms play the role of judges."

== Cover up by British ==
In 2001 over 5,000 documents that were declassified by the Israeli State Archives revealed deaths and killing of Jews at the hands of British soldiers, which were covered up by claiming self defense acts or accidents. This included the shooting of the 5 teenagers in Raanana.

In the documentary film called "The Lehi children of Raanana", made by filmmaker Peleg Levi , eyewitnesses describe seeing children running away from the building and fleeing. They did not shoot at the British, nor were any soldiers hurt.

According to Dr Saul Zadka, the author of Blood in Zion, a history of the Jewish armed struggle in Palestine, the British army often covered up their conduct during the last few years of their mandatory rule. The attack against the children was in retaliation of a Lehi attack of British army bases.

== The Third Girl ==
After one of the girls, Yehudit Cohen-Magori, died of her wounds in the hospital, Nathan Alterman published a poem entitled "The Third Girl" in his weekly Davar newspaper column the Seventh Column on November 14, 1947. "what could she do against the underground?...what could she do against the round of bullets?... therefore she is lying there quietly."

In the poem, Alterman criticizes the British for being "a whole company" who murdered a handful of boys, the Yishuv and its leadership for not recognizing the dangers of Lehi and expelling its people, and the Lehi leaders for recruiting such a young girl into their ranks.

== Aftermath ==
Lehi fighters set out to avenge the youths' murders. On November 12, an assassination attempt was made on Sergeant Keeley in Haifa. The next day, four British officials were shot in the street in Haifa and police headquarters were attacked in Jerusalem. Also, in Jerusalem, grenades were thrown into the "Ritz" café, the headquarters of Scottish soldiers (now the "Bell Center"). Two were killed and dozens were injured. On December 4, four soldiers were shot in Tel Aviv.

Members of the Lehi Intelligence Department discovered that the British had learned about the location of the course from an informant from the Al-Shubaki tribe who lived nearby; therefore, the main retribution was aimed against them. Lehi members disguised as British police officers arrived at the tribe's location, separated the men from the women, lined up six men who were known to be informants, and shot them.

Lehi issued a proclamation in Arabic "To our Arab brothers":

"The British, who are hated by us and you, are about to leave the country in disgrace. Nevertheless, some of the Jews and Arabs have not ceased to serve them. Among these servants is the Shubaki family, who lived between Ra'anana and Herzliya. Their people brought the British intelligence to the house where our fighters were training with weapons. They served as guides for the British army, which killed five of our comrades, including four young girls..."We call on our Arab brothers to keep away from their midst the hired traitors who seek to stir up hatred between us and your people so that the British will find an excuse to remain in our country as peacekeepers. O Arabs! Beware of traitors! Death to the British enemy! Death to his hired ones - Jews and Arabs - who betray their people."

== Memorial ==
In 2000, a memorial to the five Lehi children, called the "Raanana Children's Square" was inaugurated not far from the scene of the event. The square is located at the intersection of Moshe Dayan, Ha-Haprachim, and Pardes Mizrahim streets.

In 2021, the Association for the Commemoration of the Legacy of The Fighters of The Freedom of Israel (Lehi) received approval from the Raanana Municipality to erect a monument in memory of the five teenagers. The monument was inaugurated on May 6, 2022.

== Additional reading ==
- Nathan Yellin-Mor, Lohamei Herut Yisrael, Shikmona Publishing House, 1974
- Dudu Dayan: Making a State, Ministry of Defense Publishing House, pp. 62 – 64, 1991
- Natan Alterman, The Seventh Column, Volume Two, Kibbutz Hameuhad Publishing House, pp. 277– 278, 2010
