= Fajja bus attacks =

Attack on two buses during the 1947–48 Mandatory Palestine War

- Part of the 1947–1948 Civil War in Mandatory Palestine
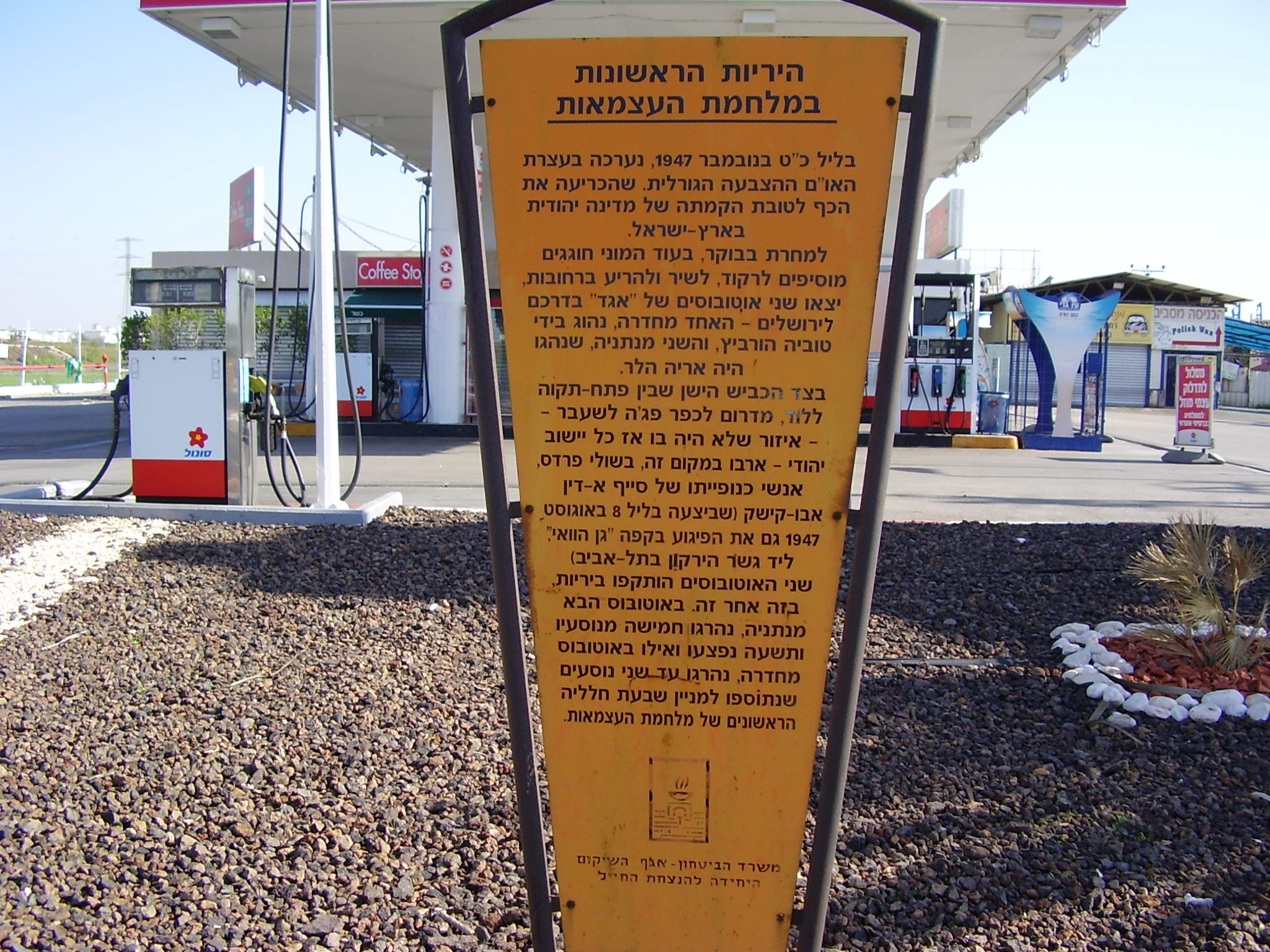
- Memorial to the people killed in the attack
- Location: near Fajja, Mandatory Palestine
- Date: November 30, 1947 (78 years, 11 months and 1 day ago)
- Deaths: 7
- Perpetrator: Arab militants

On November 30, 1947, an Egged bus on its way to Jerusalem from Netanya was attacked by Arab militants, followed by an attack on another bus, killing seven Jews. It was the first attack following the UN's adoption of the United Nations Partition Plan for Palestine, which took place the day before. According to Israeli historian Benny Morris, the attack may have been retaliation for the Shubaki family assassination by Lehi ten days prior to the incident.

== Events ==
The first bus was the Jerusalem-bound Egged bus #2094 which had left Netanya around 7:30 AM with 21 passengers. The bus was driving through the now-depopulated village of Fajja when it was intercepted by three Arabs waving, who the bus driver assumed to be hitchhikers. As he slowed down the vehicle he was met with gunfire, driving the bus off the road.

The attackers stormed the bus and shot multiple people. Five Jews were killed, including a 22-year-old woman on her way to her wedding and a man who was killed trying to protect his wife.

Twenty-five minutes after, a second bus going to Hadera received the same treatment. Two passengers were killed.

Mordechai Olmert, the father of future Prime Minister Ehud Olmert, was one of the people who survived the second attack.

== Aftermath and historical context ==
The attack occurred one day after the United Nations voted to establish a Partition Plan for Mandatory Palestine that involved splitting the British-administered region into two states: An Arab state and a Jewish one. An Arab general strike was declared, fueling the crisis. The ambush was also the first attack during the 1947–1948 civil war in Mandatory Palestine.

The Jewish Telegraph Agency reported the attacks amidst an outbreak of Arab violence against Jews on November 30, such as the killing of Moshe Goldman at an anti-partition demonstration in Haifa, under the headline "Six Jews Killed As Arabs React to Partition; Higher Committee Calls General Strike". However, New Historian Benny Morris challenged this narrative, arguing that the causes were unclear and theorizing that it was potentially a retaliation for the Shubaki family assassination, the killing of five Palestinian Arabs by Lehi near Herzliya, ten days' prior to the incident (who were in turn taking revenge because one of the members of the family had informed the British about Lehi activities). According to Morris, it was the majority view of the Haganah Intelligence Service that the primary motive of the attackers was retaliation for the Shubaki killings; this was supported by an Arab flyer posted shortly after on walls in Jaffa.

According to Palestinian historian Saleh Abd al-Jawad, historians of the 1948 war, including many Arab historians accept that the war began on the 30th November. However, he also states that it is telling that Israelis and their network of Arab collaborators do not provide information about the identity or the motives of the Palestinian gang supposedly responsible for the attack. He also states that some Israeli sources even say that the attacks may have been unrelated to the partition plan.

According to Israeli investigative journalist Ronen Bergman, the attack was committed by forces loyal to Palestinian rebel Hasan Salama.
