= The Life of the Jews in Palestine =

- Directed by: Noah Sokolovsky
- Cinematography: Miron Osip Grossman
- Production company: Mizrakh Company
- Release date: 1913
- Country: Russian Empire
- Languages: Silent film English, French, and Hebrew intertitles

Full hour-long documentary

The Life of the Jews in Palestine (French: La vie des Juifs en Palestine, Hebrew: חיי היהודים בארץ ישראל, Russian: «Жизнь евреев в Палестине») is a 1913 Russian silent documentary film directed by Noah Sokolovsky depicting Jews and Jewish communities in Ottoman Palestine. Its production was funded by thee Ha-Mizrakh Society of Odessa in the Russian Empire and occurred during a two-month visit of the Russian and Ukrainian filmmakers to Palestine. Meíron Ossip Grossman was the cinematographer. It debuted in 1913 at the 11th Zionist Congress in Basel, Switzerland.

== Content ==
Many of the individuals covered in the documentary are Ashkenazi immigrants of the Second Aliyah including Meir Dizengoff, founder and first mayor of Tel Aviv, Russo-Japanese War veteran and subsequent founder of the British Jewish Legion of World War I Joseph Trumpeldor, and Boris Schatz, founder of the Bezalel Academy of Arts and Design, shown teaching an art class.

== Production ==
Sokolovsky was an adherent of Theodor Herzl's Zionist movement and his film promoted the notion "A land without a people for a people without a land" and was a useful means of mobilizing support for the Zionist cause. The film was criticised by the Zionist left for omitting local Arabs from its portrayal.

== Reception ==
According to Yaacov Davidon, later an Israeli film exhibitor, the film was received with "indescribable enthusiasm" and "Tears of happiness gleamed in the eyes of Jewish audiences, thirsty for redemption." In Ukraine, the size of thronging crowds viewing the film prompted secret police reports.

== Preservation status ==
The film was lost shortly after its creation until in 1997 the original negative was found in France in the vault of the Centre National de la Cinématographie (CNC) by archivist Éric Le Roy. Israeli film historian Yaakov Gross assisted in the identification.

When screened at the London International Film Festival in 1998 Clyde Jeavons of the British Film Institute said the film was "...one of the most important and enthralling re-discoveries of recent times... Its historical importance, both as an anthropological time capule and as a record of the first modern Jewish immigrations to the Middle East, is self-evident in every rivetingly quotidian scene." In the evaluation of Dennis Harvey of Variety, writing in 2000, by the era's standards the "photography is exceptional, with well-composed landscape, architectural and medium-to-long-shot crowd views and good occasional use of panoramic pans from elevated points, as well as traveling perspectives from train and boat."
