= Yosef Gorny =

Israeli historian (born 1933)

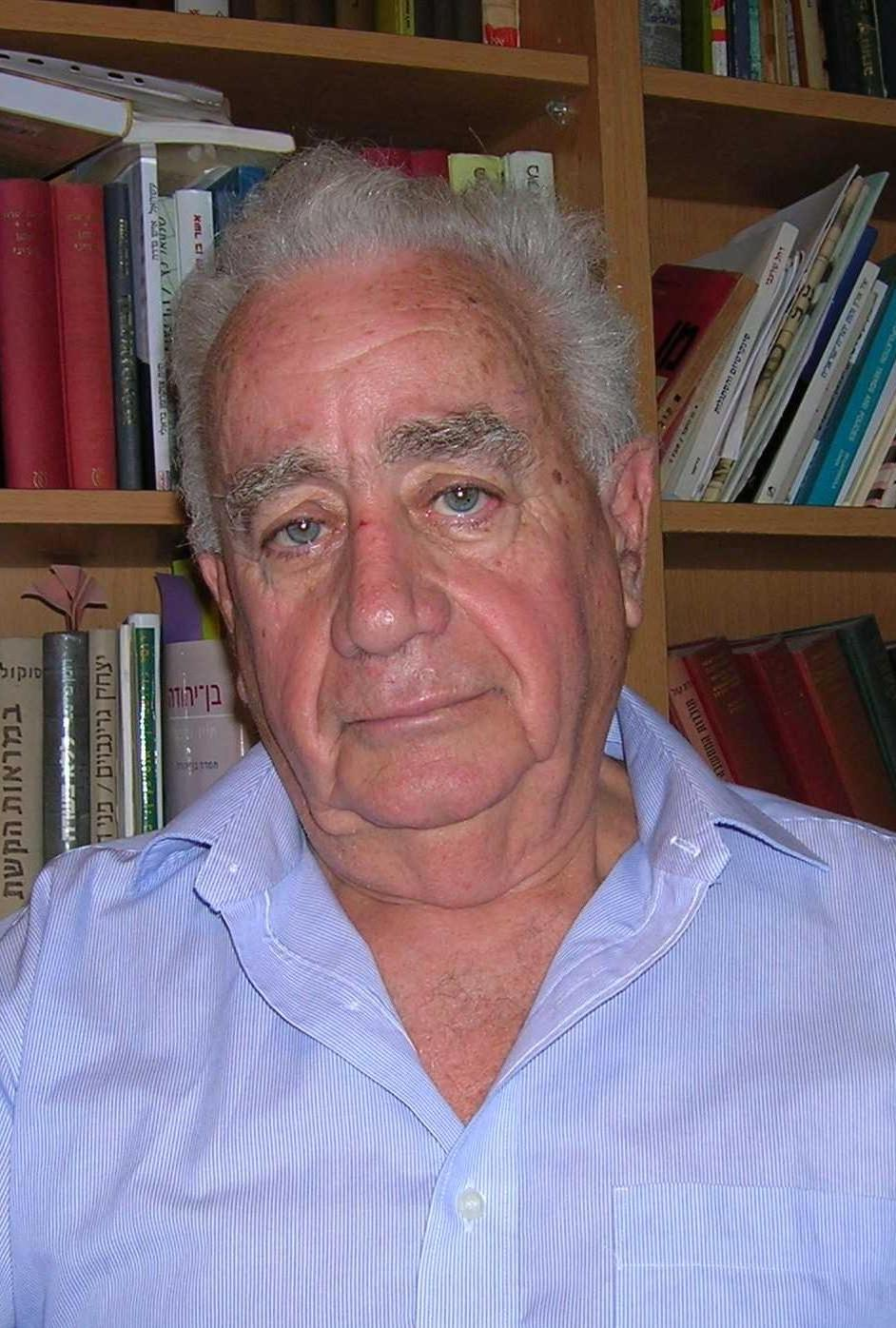
Gorny (June 2008)

Yosef Gorny (Hebrew: יוסף גורני; born 1933), is Professor of Study of Zionism and head of the Zionist Research Institute at the Tel Aviv University. He is a former head of the Weizmann Institute for the Study of Zionism, at the same university.

== Published works ==
(Selective and incomplete)

- Zionism and the Arabs, 1882-1948: a study of Ideology, Oxford University Press, 1987, ISBN 0-19-822721-3
- State of Israel in Jewish Public Thought: The Quest for Collective Identity 1994, ISBN 0-8147-3055-8
- Between Auschwitz and Jerusalem: Jewish Collective Identity in Crisis, 2003, ISBN 0-85303-419-2
- Eliezer Ben Rafael; Yosef Gorni; Yaacov Ro'i, eds. (2003). Contemporary Jewries: convergence and divergence. Brill. ISBN 978-90-04-12950-4.

== Awards ==
- In 2006, Gorny was a co-recipient (with Chava Turniansky) of the Bialik Prize for Jewish thought.

== See also ==
- List of Bialik Prize recipients
