= Shubaki family assassination =

1947 event in Mandatory Palestine

- Part of the Intercommunal conflict in Mandatory Palestine, the Jewish insurgency in Mandatory Palestine and Jewish extremist terrorism
- Location: Arab al-Shubaki, Palestine
- Date: 19 November 1947; 4:30 am
- Target: Family of suspected informants
- Attack type: Reprisal operation, summary execution
- Weapon: Submachine guns
- Deaths: 5 unarmed adult men of the Shubaki family
- Perpetrator: Lehi
- No. of participants: 10 militants
- Motive: Collective punishment, deterrence of Palestinians
- Charges: None

The Shubaki family assassination was the summary execution of five adult members of the Shubaki family in the village of Arab al-Shubaki, Mandatory Palestine on 19 November 1947 by Lehi, a Zionist paramilitary and militant organization, on suspicions that members of that family had acted as informants for the British police.

The attack followed a period of relative calm for several months, during which the Palestinian Jewish insurgency was almost exclusively directed at the British presence rather than Palestinian Arabs, raising fears of retaliation against the Yishuv. Eleven days later there was indeed a retaliatory attack killing seven of them.

== Buildup to the assassination ==
=== "Lehi Children" incident and the Lehi insurgency against the British ===
On 11 November 1947, in the final stages of the Jewish insurgency in Mandatory Palestine, British intelligence were made aware that the Lehi was holding a firearms course for young members in Ra'anana, and surrounded the building. The British respondents shot dead five members of Lehi, with no British deaths or injuries, in what is known as the Lehi Children Affair. According to eyewitness testimonies and the Lehi account, four unarmed teenage members aged 15–18 were fatally shot along with their 19-year-old instructor as they tried to run away from the house, and two teenagers aged 16–17 years were left severely wounded. This is in contrast to the account given by the British police, which maintained that the victims were shot because they were armed and the officers under "immediate danger." Police files that were released to the public later in 2021 indicated that the order to raid the house had been approved directly from the British government in London. While the police records do state that the British were under danger, it does not mention at what moment the officers started shooting. It also confirms that the victims were already running out the building before they were killed.

Lehi retaliated with terrorist attacks against the British:

- On 12 November 1947, Lehi members killed one British soldier and wounded three near Haifa
- On 13 November 1947, Lehi members attacked patrons at the Ritz coffee shop in Jerusalem, injuring 28 people
- On 15 November 1947, Lehi members killed two British policemen in Jerusalem

=== Planning of the assassination ===
Lehi leader Nathan Yellin-Mor led an investigation into how the British knew about the meeting on 11 November. The Lehi investigation concluded that members of the Palestinian Arab Shubaki family, which lived close to the Lehi house in Ra'anana, had informed the British authorities about the site's location. Lehi decided to kill members of the family in order to punish the family and to warn Arabs throughout Palestine not to help the British.

== The assassination ==
At 4:30am on 19 November 1947, ten Lehi members armed with submachine guns entered the village of Arab al-Shubaki (Arabic: عرب الشباكي), situated between the Jewish towns of Herzeliya and Ra'anana (with whom they are thought to have had good relations).

The Lehi militants were dressed as police, and told the mukhtar (village head) to gather all the men in the village and select five of them. They took the unarmed men to a nearby field and executed them.

The victims were:

- Ahmed Salameh Shubaki (50 years old)
- Wadia Shubaki (25 years old)
- Sammy Shubaki (23 years old)
- Sami Shubaki (23 years old) (cousin)
- Sabar Ahmed Shubaki (27 years old, a cousin)

== Aftermath ==
On 21 November, Lehi issued a statement in which they assumed responsibility for the assassinations. The statement, directed at "our Arab brothers", stressed that the "Fighters for the Freedom of Israel" committed these murders because they suspected Shubaki family members to have tipped off the Palestine Police Force, claiming it had nothing to do with them being Muslim Arabs. Lehi published the names of further residents who they accused of supporting British rule, threatening to kill every one of them who doesn't cease their government support.

In retaliation to this massacre, seven Yishuv were shot and killed on 30 November 1947 on two buses near Fajja, with flyers appearing shortly after explaining the killings with the Shubaki family massacre.

== See also ==
- Killings and massacres during the 1948 Palestine war
- List of massacres in Palestine after the 1948 Palestine war
- Timeline of intercommunal conflict in Mandatory Palestine
