= Balad al-Shaykh massacre =

1947–48 massacre of Palestinians

- Location: 32.7725°N 35.0427°E; Balad al-Sheikh
- Date: December 31, 1947 – January 1, 1948
- Target: Palestinian Arab civilians
- Attack type: Massacre
- Deaths: 60–70 Arab villagers, (Note: Golani & Manna 2011, "70 village residents – including men, women and children – were murdered in their homes") (Note: Lockman 1996, "The Jewish attackers killed some sixty men, women, and children and destroyed several houses.") (Note: Pappé 2006, "Over sixty Palestinians dead") 2 Haganah soldiers (Note: Morris 2004, "The Haganah suffered two dead and two injured.")
- Injuries: 41 Arab villagers, 2 Haganah soldiers (Note: Morris 2004, "The Haganah suffered two dead and two injured.")
- Perpetrator: Haganah
- Motive: Revenge for the Haifa Oil Refinery massacre

The Balad al-Shaykh massacre (Note: Also spelled Balad al-Sheikh) was the killing of a large number of Palestinians by the Haganah in the village of Balad al-Shaykh during the early stages of the 1947–1948 civil war in Mandatory Palestine. It was one of the largest, and earliest, massacres during the 1948 Palestine war.

Between 60 and 70 Arab villagers were killed in the attack, which was conducted as a retaliation to the Haifa Oil Refinery massacre. The killings had a significant effect on morale amongst Palestinian civilians in the Haifa region and contributed to the 1947–1949 Palestinian expulsion and flight.

== Background ==
The incident was part of the 1947–1948 civil war between Jews and Arabs in Mandatory Palestine. It was preceded by a number of violent incidents, perpetrated one in retaliation for the other. A Haganah attack on the village on December 11 or 12th killed six Palestinians. (Note: Morris 2004, "The first large Haganah reprisal, against the village of Balad al Sheikh, just east of Haifa, took place on 12 December (six Arabs were killed)") (Note: Date of December 11, 1946 in Saleh Abdel Jawad, (2007). Zionist Massacres: the Creation of the Palestinian Refugee Problem in the 1948 War. In: Benvenisti, E., Gans, C., Hanafi, S. (eds) Israel and the Palestinian Refugees. Beiträge zum ausländischen öffentlichen Recht und Völkerrecht, vol 189. Springer, Berlin, Heidelberg. https://doi.org/10.1007/978-3-540-68161-8_3.)

The Haifa Oil Refinery massacre took place on 30 December 1947, the day before the second Balad al-Shaykh attack. In this case, it was the Zionist paramilitary group, the Irgun, which threw a number of grenades at a crowd of some 100 Arab day laborers who had gathered outside the main gate of the British-owned Haifa oil refinery looking for work, resulting in 6 deaths and 42 wounded. Arab refinery workers and others attacked Jewish workers, killing 39 of them.

The conclusion of a committee of inquiry established by the Jewish community of Haifa was that the Arab attack was unpremeditated, being a response to the Irgun assault. The Jewish Agency condemned the same group for what it called an 'act of madness' that was responsible for the catastrophic loss of Jewish lives. At the same time, it authorized the Haganah to undertake an operation of retaliation.

== Massacre ==
On the night of December 31, 1947, to January 1, 1948, the Palmach, an arm of the Haganah, attacked the town of Balad al-Shaykh while the residents were asleep, firing from the slopes of Mount Carmel.

According to a February 26, 2026 Haaretz investigation, the released archival materials also describe cases of deliberate killings carried out as acts of revenge for the deaths of Jewish fighters, including at Balad al-Shaykh. The report states that in some instances violence was motivated by retaliatory impulses following the loss of comrades during combat operations.

Israeli historian Benny Morris writes:

The Haganah massively retaliated on the night of 31 December 1947 - 1 January 1948 raiding the villages of Balad al Sheikh and Hawassa, in which many of the refinery's workers lived. The raiding unit's orders were to 'kill maximum adult males'. The raiders penetrated to the center of Balad al Sheikh, fired into and blew up houses, and pulled out adult males, and shot them. According to the HGS, 'the penetrating units... were forced to deviate from the line agreed upon and in a few cases hit women and children' after being fired upon from inside houses. The Haganah suffered two dead and two injured. Haganah reports put Arab casualties variously at 'about 70 killed', and 21 killed ('including two women and five children') and 41 injured.

According to Zachary Lockman, about 60 men, women and children were killed and several dozen houses were blown up.

== See also ==
- Killings and massacres during the 1948 Palestine War

== Bibliography ==
- Lockman, Zachary (1996). Comrades and Enemies: Arab and Jewish Workers in Palestine, 1906-1948. University of California Press. p. 353. ISBN 978-0-520-91749-1.
- Morris, Benny (2003). The Birth of the Palestinian Refugee Problem Revisited. Cambridge: Cambridge University Press. ISBN 0-521-00967-7
- Pappé, Ilan (1999), The Israel/Palestine Question, Routledge, ISBN 978-0-415-16947-9
- 'The British Withdrawal From Palestine: Possible Advance Of Date By Six Weeks, 17 Killed In Attack On Arab Village', The Times, Friday, January 2, 1948; pg. 4; Issue 50958; col A.
