= Yajur =

Yajur may refer to:

- Yajurveda, the third of the four canonical texts of Hinduism
- Yajur, Haifa, a Palestinian Arab village depopulated in 1948
