= Nesher =

City in northern Israel

Nesher נֶשֶׁר
- City

Hebrew transcription(s)
  - ISO 259: Nešr
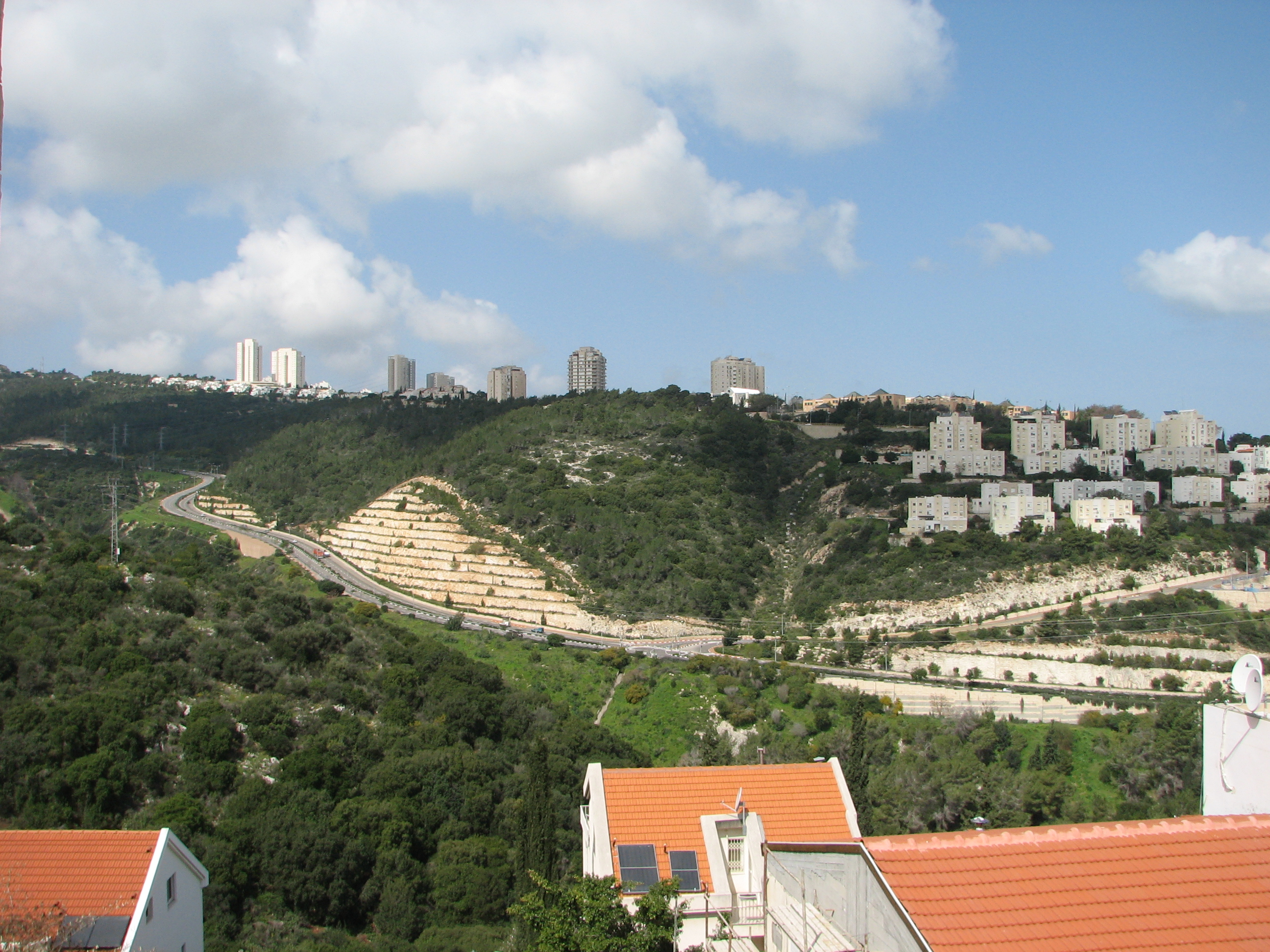
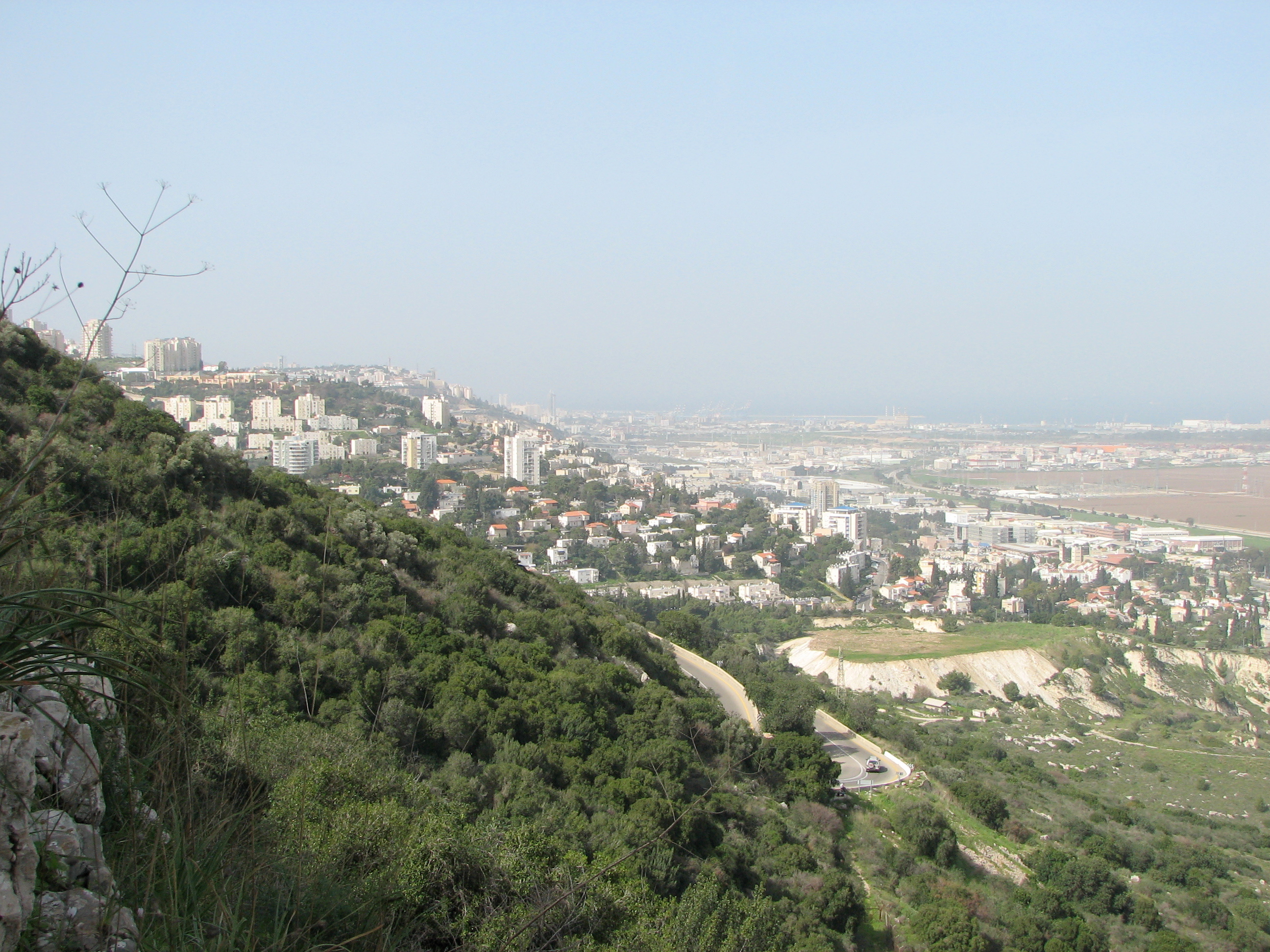
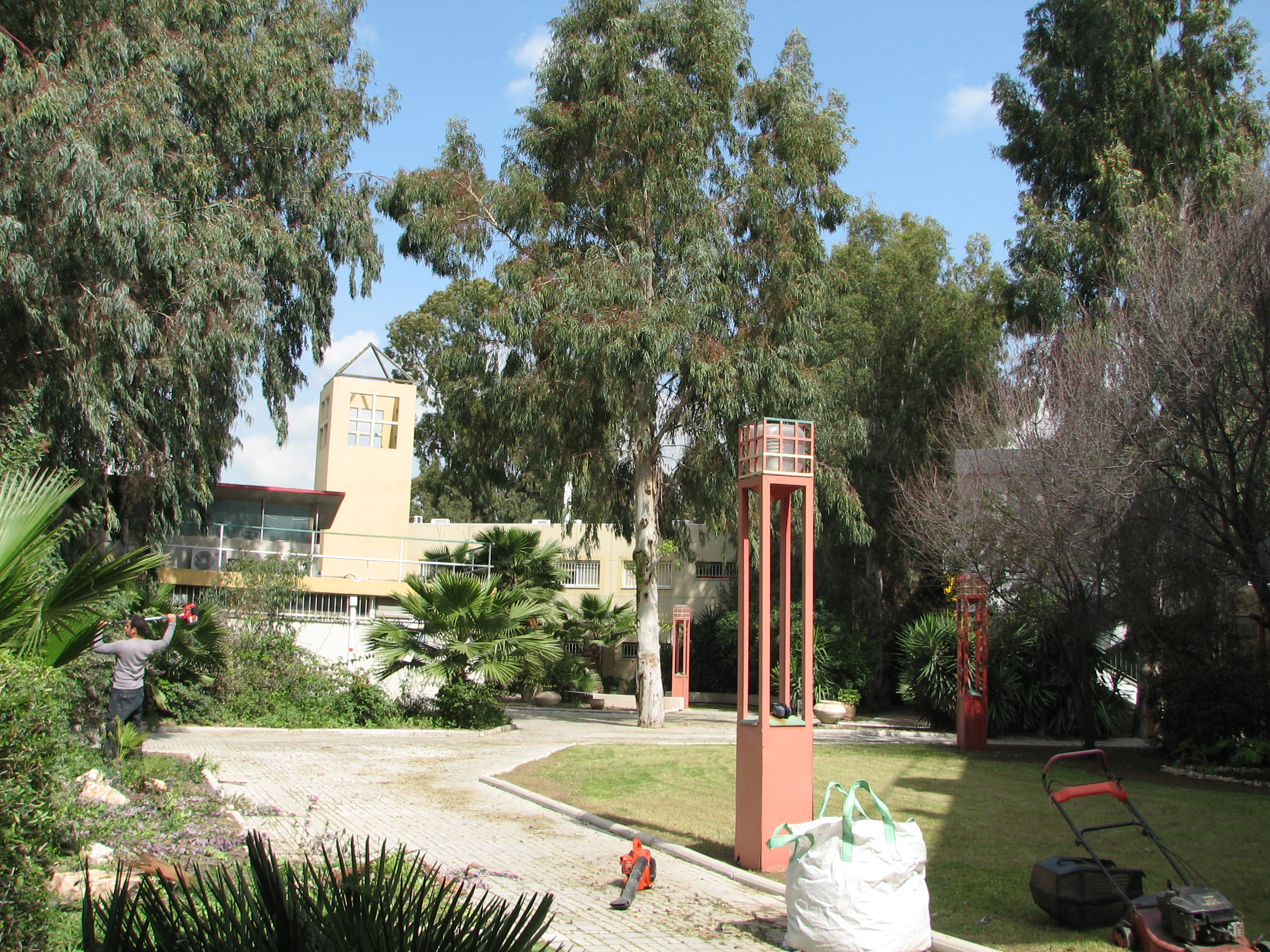
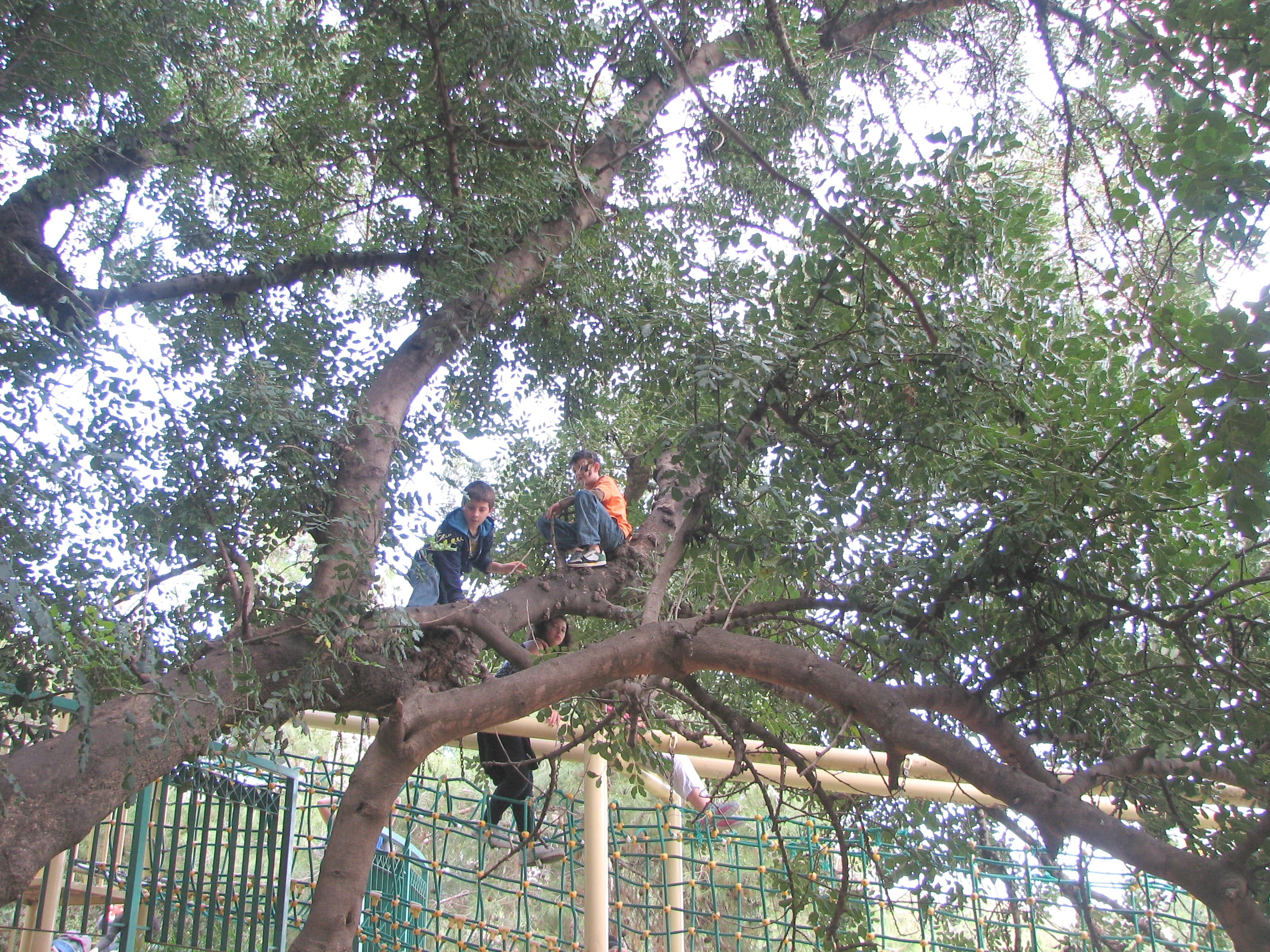
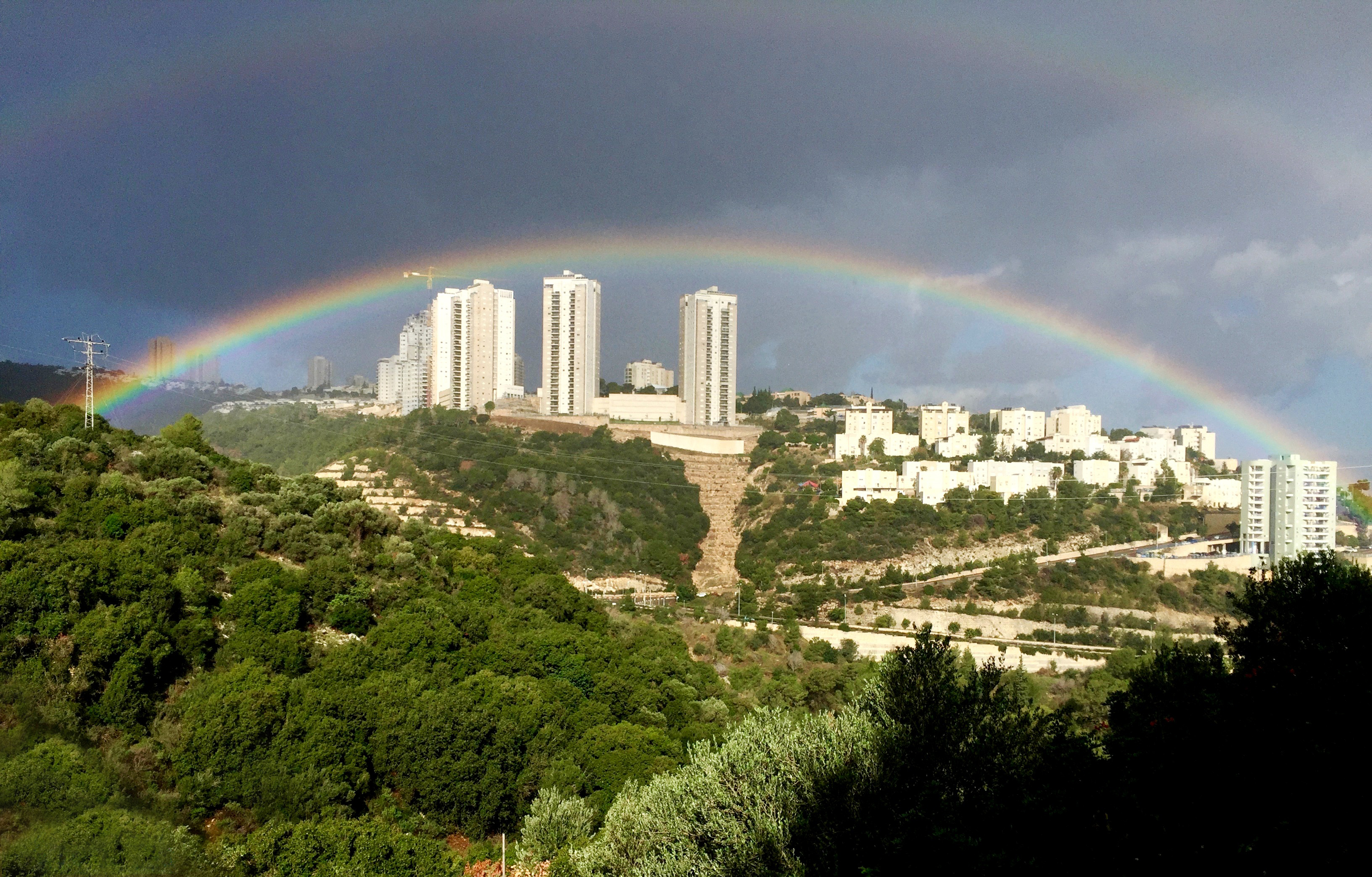

- Municipal emblem

- Location within Haifa region of Israel Location within Israel
- Coordinates: 32°46′16″N 35°02′22″E
- Country: Israel
- District: Haifa
- Subdistrict: Haifa
- Founded: 1923

Government
  - Mayor: Roy Levi

Area
  - Total: 12,090 dunams (12.09 km^{2}; 4.67 sq mi)

Population (2024)
  - Total: 22,896
  - Density: 1,894/km^{2} (4,905/sq mi)

Ethnicity
  - Jews and others: 98.6%
  - Arabs: 1.4%
- Name meaning: "Vulture"

Nesher (Hebrew: נֶשֶׁר) is a city in the Haifa District of Israel. In 2024 it had a population of 22,896. It was founded in 1923 as a workers town for the Nesher Cement factory, the first cement factory in the country.

== History ==
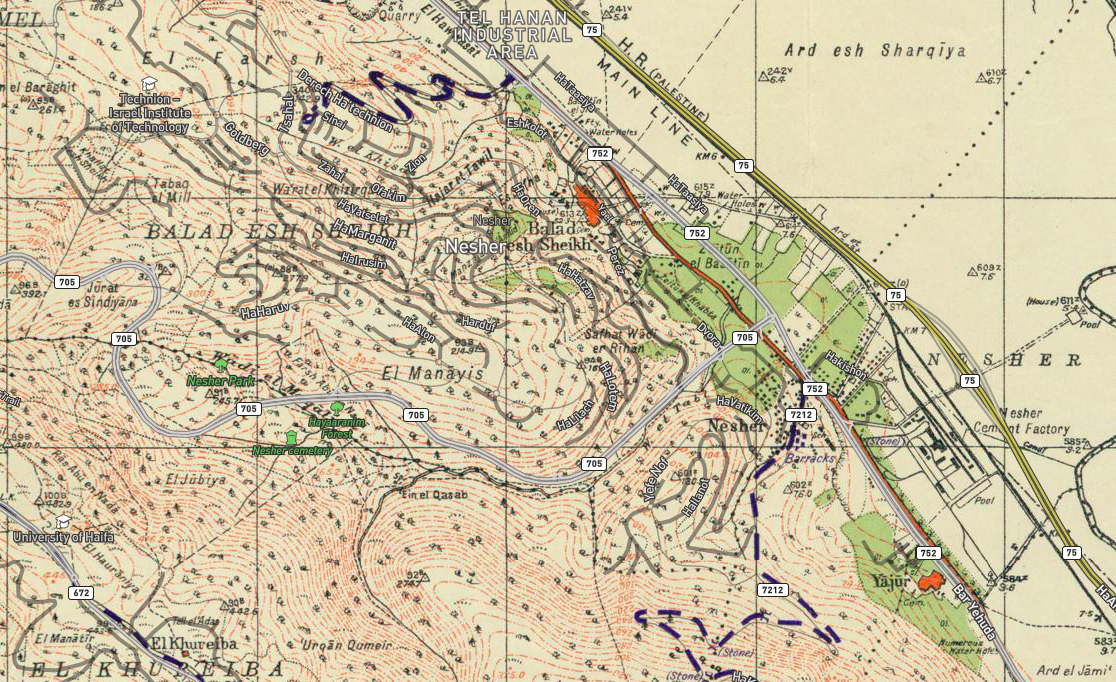
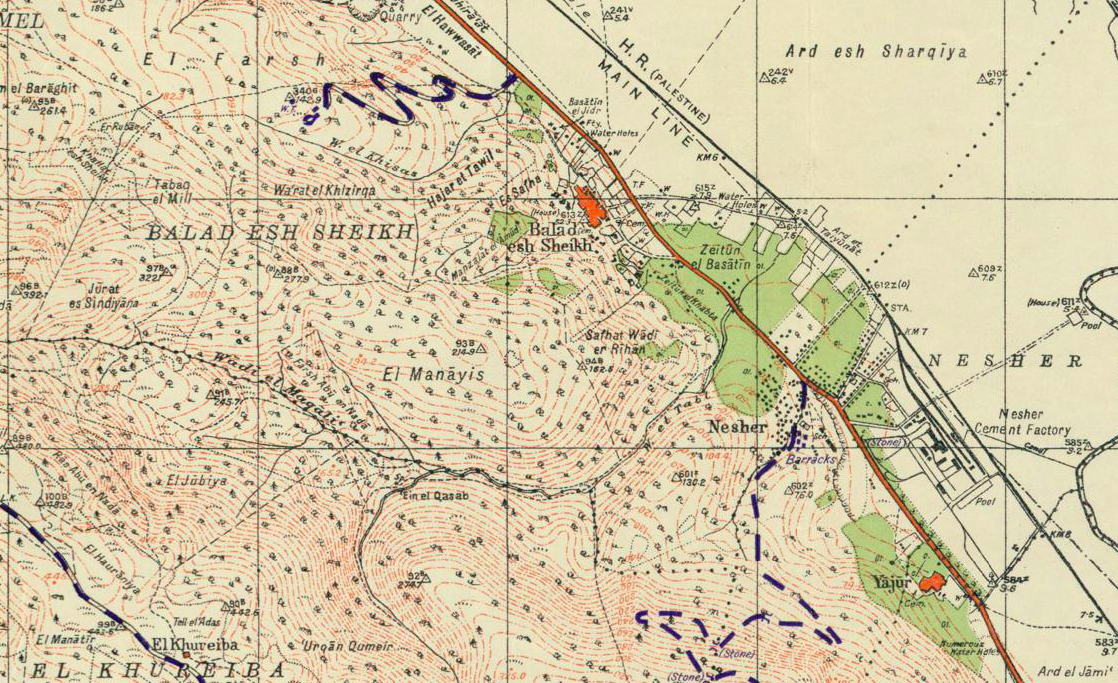
Nesher street map (date 2018, white text and light grey streets) overlaid on a Survey of Palestine map (date 1932, black text, red urban areas and black streets), showing the relative locations of "Old Nesher" and the cement factory, and the depopulated Palestinian towns of Balad al-Sheikh, Yajur and Al Khureiba.

Nesher was founded in 1923 as a workers town for the Nesher Cement factory, established in September 1923 by Michael Pollack, a Jewish industrialist from Russia. The area was swampy and malaria-infested, but employees of the factory gradually moved there with their families, bringing the population to 1,500. Nesher was floated as a public company in 1925. During the 1929 Palestine riots, Arabs from neighbouring Balad al-Sheikh attacked the factory and burned down a farm.

By the mid-1930s, Nesher Cement had 700 employees, both Jewish and Arab.

In 1948, thousands of Jewish immigrants from Europe, Iraq and North Africa settled in Nesher. The town also expanded over the Palestinian village of Balad al-Sheikh, immediately north-west of Old Nesher, after it was depopulated during the 1947–1948 civil war in Mandatory Palestine. A portion of the Tel Hanan neighborhood of the city was built over the village. In 1952, a local council was formed comprising four neighborhoods – Nesher, Giv'at Nesher, Ben-Dor and Tel Hanan. The first mayor was Yehuda Shimroni.

On 24 March 2026 during the Iran War, an apartment building in Nesher was struck by cluster munitions from an Iranian ballistic missile. Nearby vehicles were also damaged, injuring a person.

== Demographics ==
Historical population
Year	Pop.	±%
1972	9,500	—
1983	9,500	+0.0%
1995	18,900	+98.9%
2008	23,300	+23.3%
2022	22,911	−1.7%
2024	22,897	−0.1%

CBS statistics for 2005 show Nesher's ethnic makeup as 99.5% Jewish and other non-Arabs. 30.7% of the population in 2005 were immigrants who came to Israel after 1990.

== Education ==
The city's education system comprises six elementary schools, one comprehensive high school, two middle schools and 36 kindergartens and day care centers with an enrollment of 4,000 pupils. Over 70% of Nesher's high school students take the Bagrut matriculation exams, with a pass rate of 98%, one of the highest rates in Israel. Nesher's high school won the Israeli Education Prize twice in the span of a decade.

== Twinning and cultural exchange ==
In 2005, the Broward County Jewish Federation established a partnership with Nesher in an effort to create a people-to-people cultural exchange program that includes high school and college student exchanges and video conferencing for events such as school celebrations and concerts.

== Nesher Israel Cement Enterprises Ltd ==
A city-forming enterprise, The Portland Cement Company "Nesher" Limited was founded in 1923 with a founding capital of £250,000. Its head office was at 7 Queen Square Southamptom Row, London, W.C.1, United Kingdom. In that year, the company acquired in Yazour, located at a distance of 8 km. from Haifa, 4,000 dunams of land, out of which 1,000 on the slopes of Carmel. The factory that was built there was one of the most modern cement factories in the world and employed 250 workers. As of 1927, the factory produced 60,000-70,000 tons of superior Portland cement per year. The factory was connected by railway to the most important cities of the region, including the ones in Syria and Egypt. The enterprise also founded the workers' town that, as of 1927, counted 30 buildings with gardens.

== Emblem ==
The municipal emblem was designed by David Hollod and approved at a local committee meeting on the 24th of October 1962. It includes multiple references:

- The vulture represents the name of the city and the cement factory from its inception.
- The 4 hills represent the mountainous terrain and the four original neighborhoods that constituted the settlement–Ben Dor, Tel Hanan, Nesher, and Givat Nesher.
- The factory and chimney represent the industrial foundation the city was established upon.
- The tree represents the growth and prosperity of the city over the years.

== Voting Patterns ==
In the 2022 election, 52 percent of voters in Nesher voted for the parties of the center-left coalition led by Yair Lapid, while 45 percent voted for the parties of the right-wing coalition led by Benjamin Netanyahu and 0.6 percent voted for the Arab parties.

In the 2026 election, 53 percent of voters in Nesher voted for the parties of the center-left coalition led by Gadi Eisenkot, while 40 percent voted for the parties of the right-wing coalition led by Benjamin Netanyahu and 1.1 percent voted for the Arab parties. An additional 3.5 percent voted for the Reservists, and 1.8 percent voted for Amcha Yisrael. Voter turnout increased 15 percent from the 2022 election.

== Gallery ==
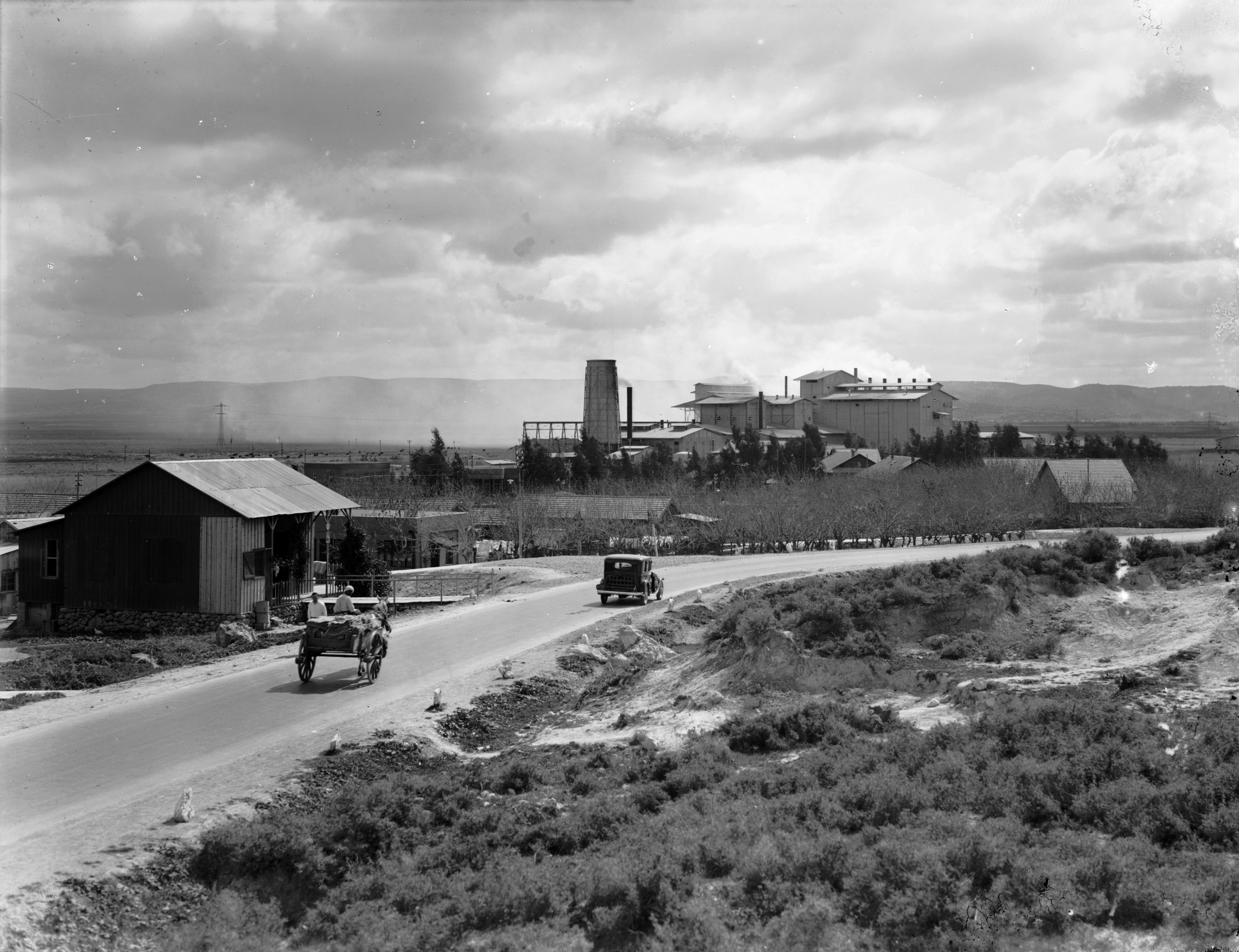
Nesher Cement factory, 1924

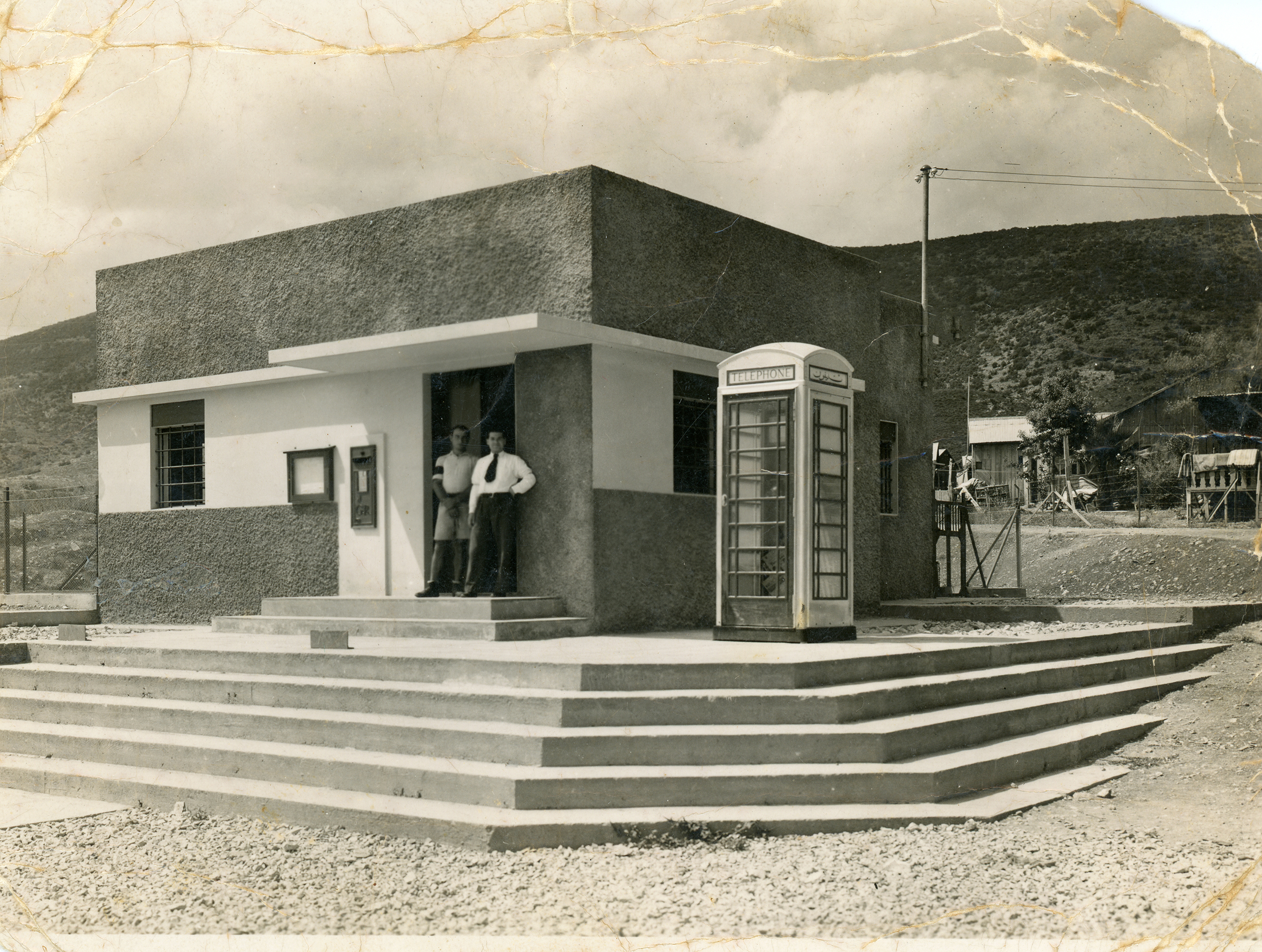
Post office building in Nesher, 1938

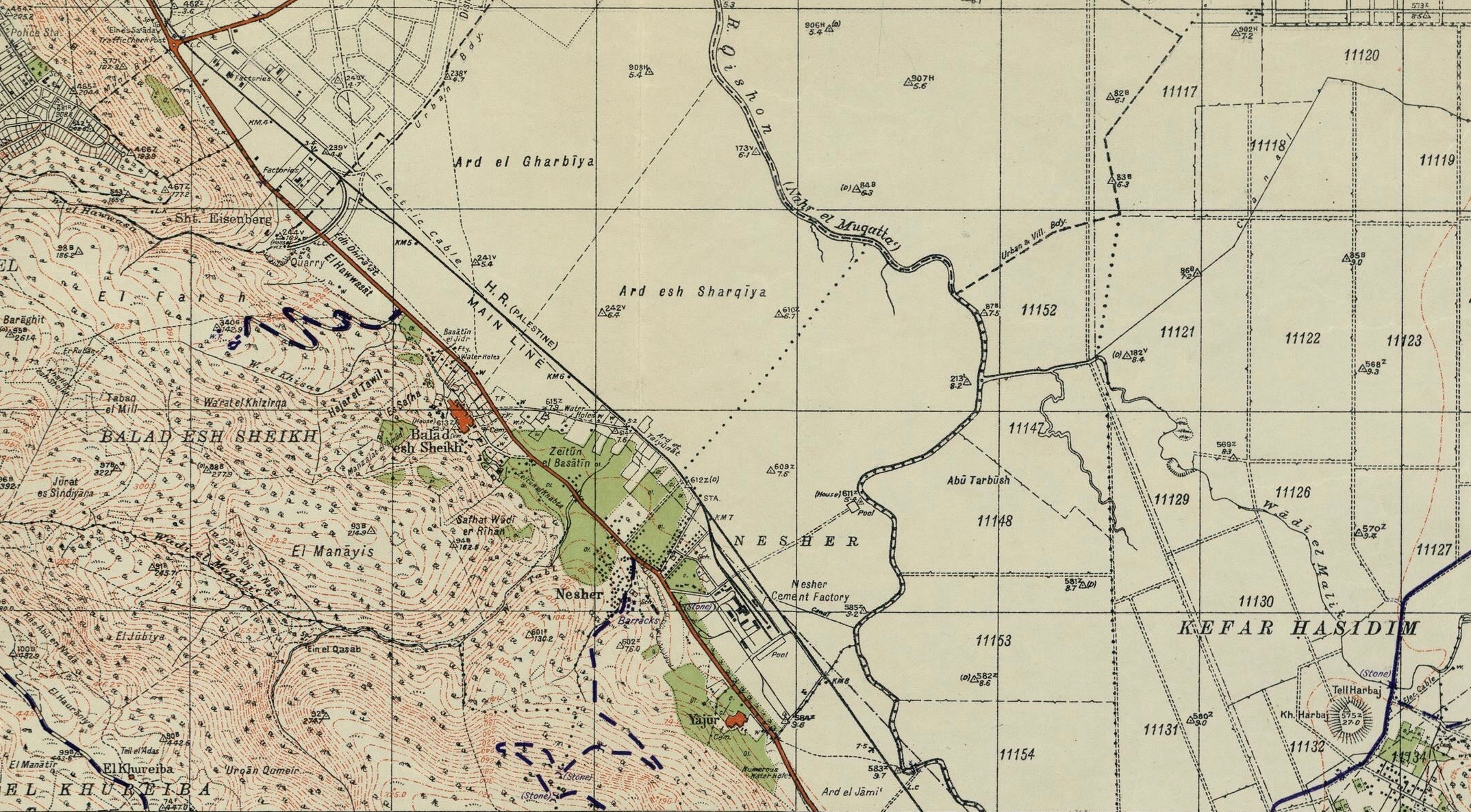
Nesher 1942 1:20,000

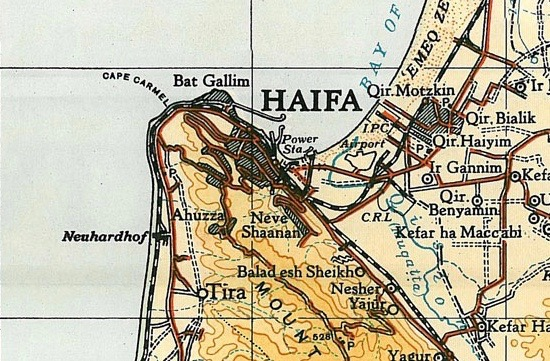
Nesher 1945 1:250,000
