= Yajur, Haifa =

Yajur ياجور
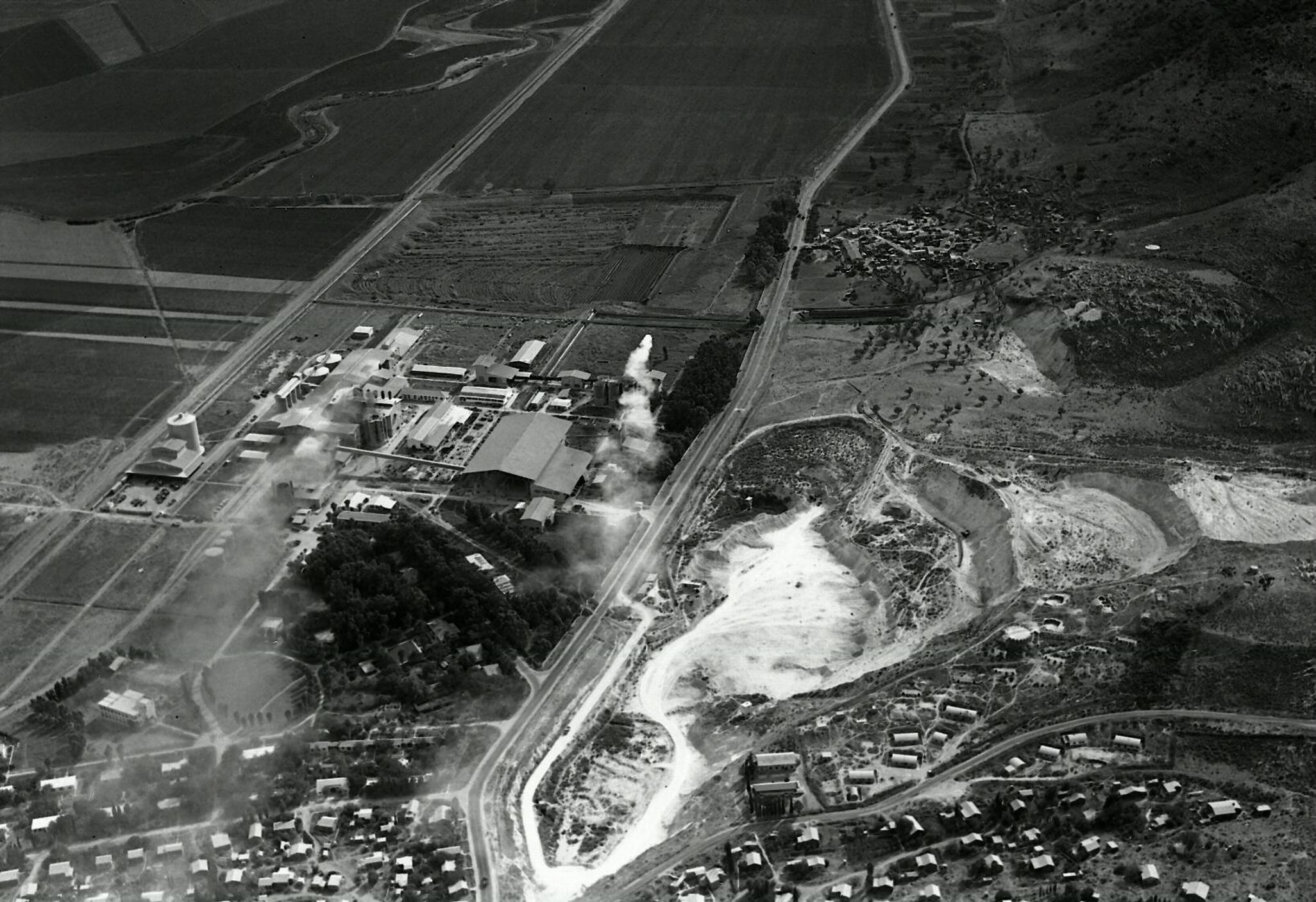
- Etymology: from personal name
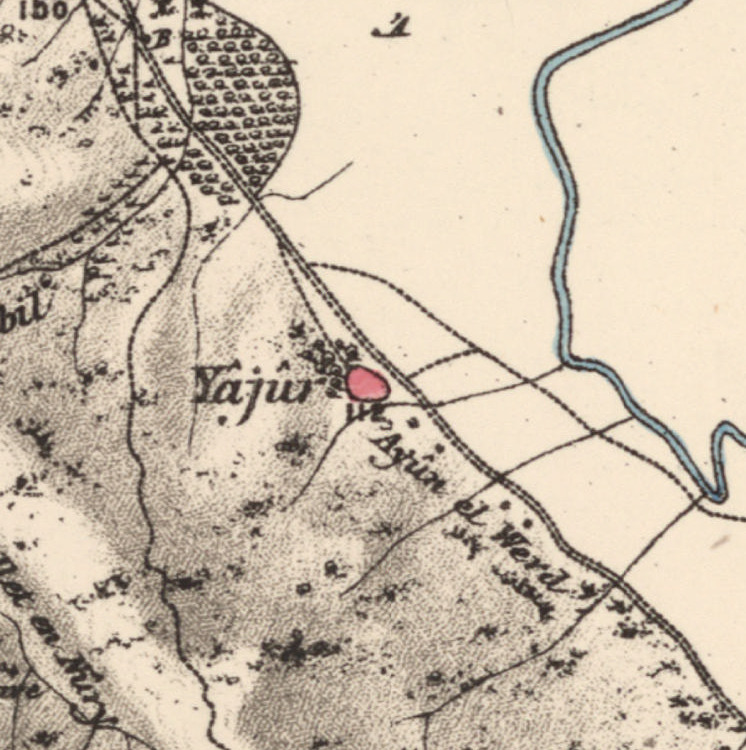
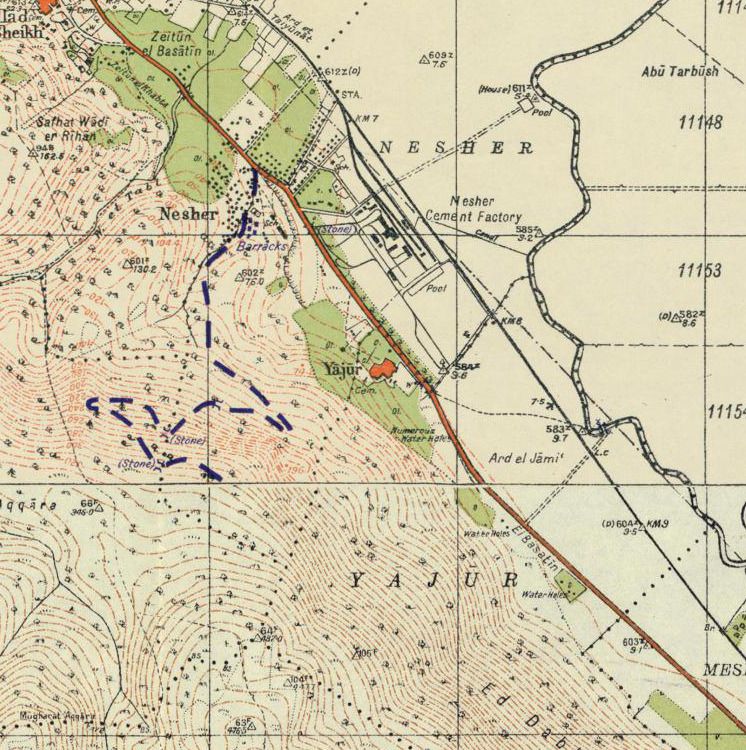
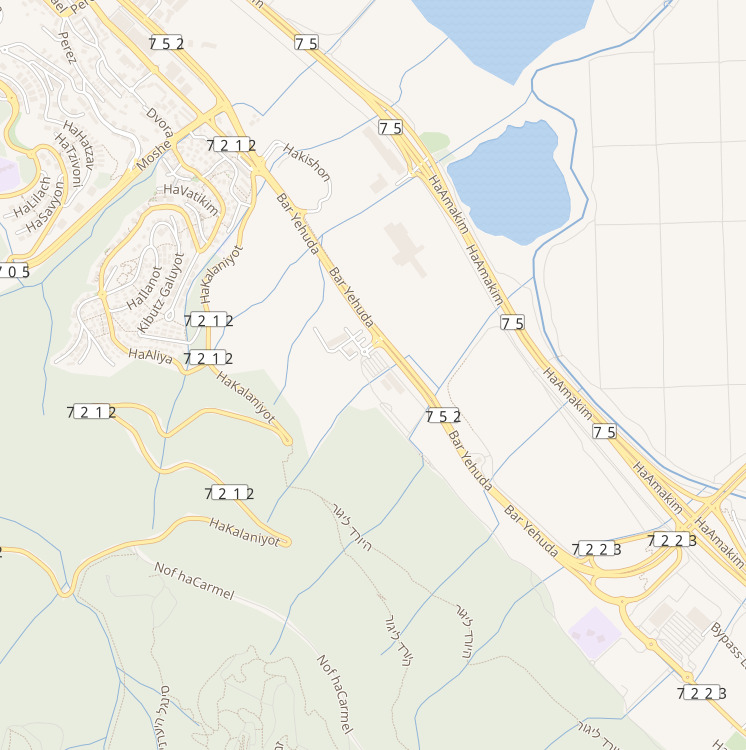
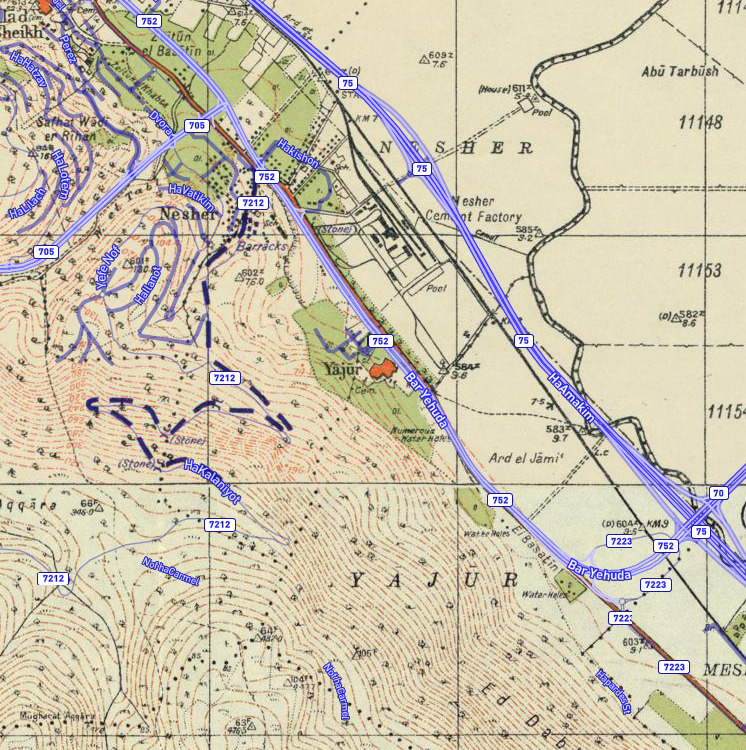
- 1870s map 1940s map modern map 1940s with modern overlay map A series of historical maps of the area around Yajur, Haifa (click the buttons)

- Location within Mandatory Palestine
- Coordinates: 32°45′31″N 35°03′26″E
- Palestine grid: 155/240
- Geopolitical entity: Mandatory Palestine
- Subdistrict: Haifa
- Date of depopulation: April 25, 1948

Area
  - Total: 2,720 dunams (2.72 km^{2}; 1.05 sq mi)

Population (1945)
  - Total: 610
- Cause(s) of depopulation: Military assault by Yishuv forces
- Secondary cause: Influence of nearby town's fall
- Current Localities: Yagur

Yajur (Arabic: ياجور, Yâjûr) was a Palestinian Arab village located 9.5 kilometres (5.9 mi) southeast of Haifa. It was depopulated during the 1947–48 Civil War in Mandatory Palestine on April 25, 1948.

== History ==
Fragments of glass, and tombs with sarcophagi are located in the old village area today.

Yajur was mentioned as part of the domain of the Crusaders during the hudna (truce) between the Crusaders based in Acre and the Mamluk sultan Al Mansur Qalawun declared in 1283.

=== Ottoman era ===
In 1799, it was noted on the map that Pierre Jacotin compiled that year, though it was misnamed as Beled el Charq (=Balad al-Sheikh).

In 1872, the Ottoman authorities sold land in Yajur to two Lebanese businessmen, Sursock and Salim al-Khuri.

In 1875, Victor Guérin found the village to have about 200 inhabitants, and that it was surrounded by fig and olive trees.

A population list from about 1887 showed that Yajur had about 150 inhabitants; all Muslims.

In the early twentieth century the village, named El-Yadschur, was noted with 153 inhabitants. The village had a mosque. It was also noted that the villagers no longer owned their land, as it was owned by a selim el-churi, who planned to start silk production in the village.

=== British Mandate era ===
In the 1922 census of Palestine Yajur had a population of 202; all Muslims, while in the 1931 census it was counted with Nesher; together they had 1,449 inhabitants; 554 Muslim, 26 Christians and 858 Jews, in addition to 11 with no religion, in a total of 291 houses.

The area was acquired by the Jewish community as part of the Sursock Purchase. The Lebanese landowners sold land in Yajur to the Zionists, who in turn established the kibbutz of Yagur in 1922 on what had traditionally been village land.

The village population in the 1945 statistics was 610; 560 Muslims and 50 Christians, with a total of 2,720 dunams of land. Of this, Arabs owned 344 dunams (13 percent), and used 57 dunums of land for plantations and irrigable land, 261 for cereals, while 18 dunams were classified as built-up land. Meanwhile, 486 dunams of land (18 percent) were owned by Jews, while 1,785 dunams (66 percent) were classified as public (i.e. un-cultivatable) land.

=== 1948 and aftermath ===
Following the war the area was incorporated into the State of Israel. In 1992, the village site was described: "No traces of the houses remain on the site, which is marked by numerous fig trees and a smaller number of olive trees." Kibbutz Yagur uses part of Yajur's former land for agriculture, with cement factories on another part.

== Gallery ==
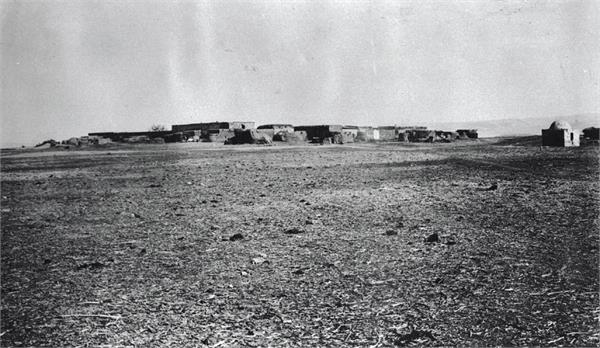
Yajur 1925

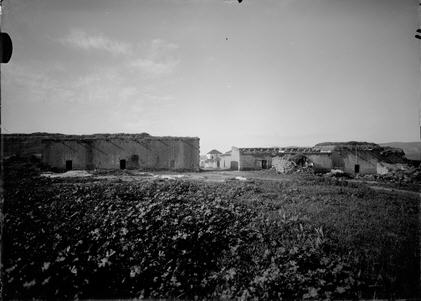
Yajur 1926

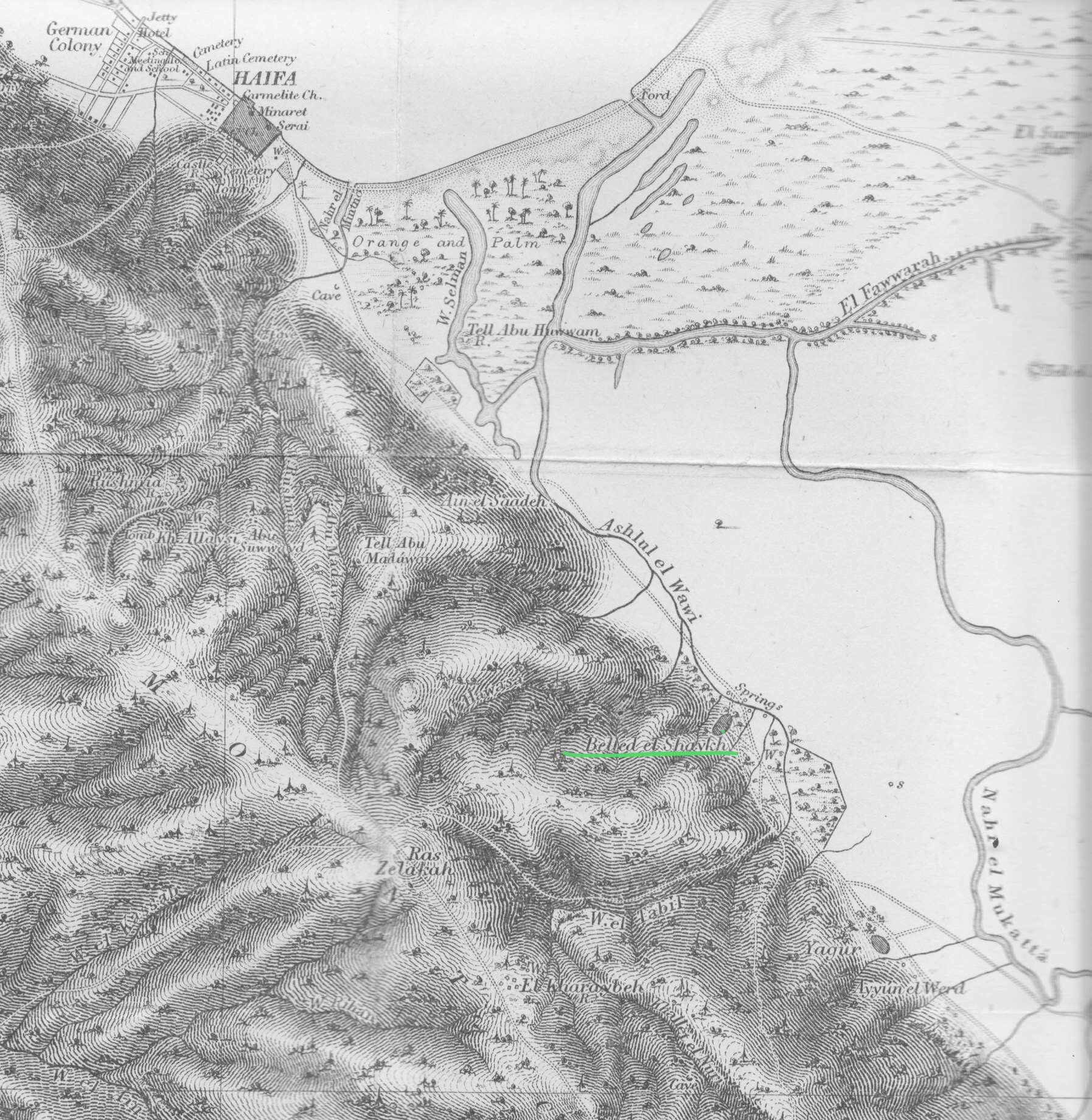
Yajur (Yagur) Palestine Exploration Fund (PEF) map. 1875

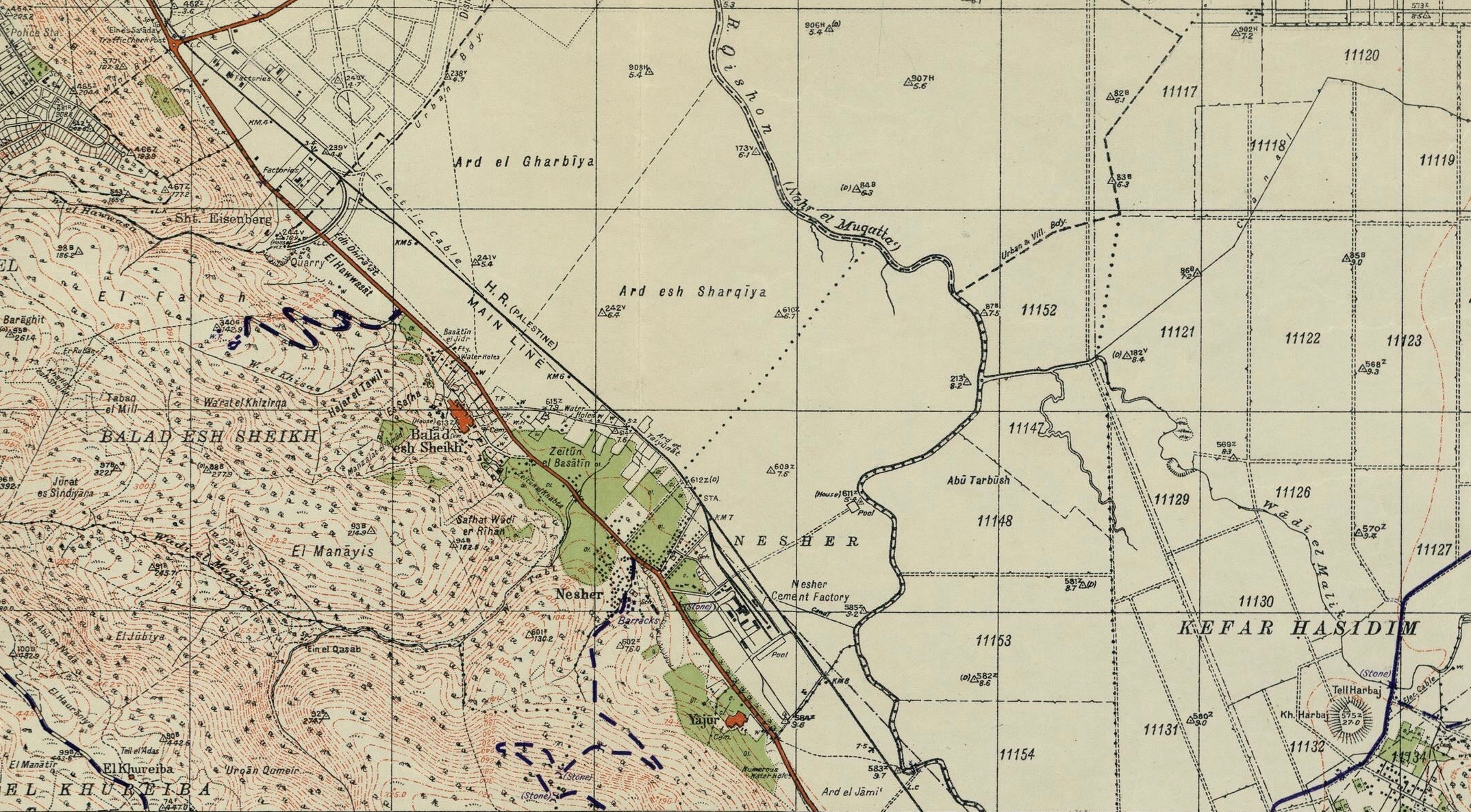
Yajur 1942 1:20,000

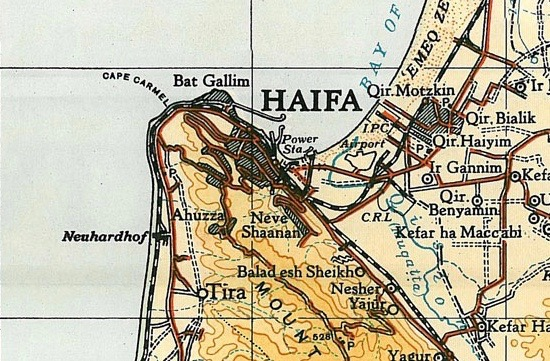
Yajur 1945 1:250,000

== Bibliography ==
- Barag, Dan (1979). "A new source concerning the ultimate borders of the Latin Kingdom of Jerusalem". Israel Exploration Journal. 29: 197–217.
- Barron, J.B., ed. (1923). Palestine: Report and General Abstracts of the Census of 1922. Government of Palestine.
- Government of Palestine, Department of Statistics (1945). Village Statistics, April, 1945.
- Guérin, V. (1880). Description Géographique Historique et Archéologique de la Palestine (in French). Vol. 3: Galilee, pt. 1. Paris: L'Imprimerie Nationale.
- Hadawi, S. (1970). Village Statistics of 1945: A Classification of Land and Area ownership in Palestine. Palestine Liberation Organization Research Center.
- Khalidi, W. (1992). All That Remains: The Palestinian Villages Occupied and Depopulated by Israel in 1948. Washington D.C.: Institute for Palestine Studies. ISBN 0-88728-224-5.
- Karmon, Y. (1960). "An Analysis of Jacotin's Map of Palestine" (PDF). Israel Exploration Journal. 10 (3, 4): 155–173, 244–253. Archived from the original (PDF) on 2019-12-22.
- Mills, E., ed. (1932). Census of Palestine 1931. Population of Villages, Towns and Administrative Areas. Jerusalem: Government of Palestine.
- Morris, B. (2004). The Birth of the Palestinian Refugee Problem Revisited. Cambridge University Press. ISBN 978-0-521-00967-6.
- Mülinen, Egbert Friedrich von 1908, Beiträge zur Kenntnis des Karmels "Separateabdruck aus der Zeitschrift des Deutschen Palëstina-Vereins Band XXX (1907) Seite 117-207 und Band XXXI (1908) Seite 1-258."
- Palmer, E.H. (1881). The Survey of Western Palestine: Arabic and English Name Lists Collected During the Survey by Lieutenants Conder and Kitchener, R. E. Transliterated and Explained by E.H. Palmer. Committee of the Palestine Exploration Fund.
- Schumacher, G. (1888). "Population list of the Liwa of Akka". Quarterly Statement - Palestine Exploration Fund. 20: 169–191.
