= Haifa Oil Refinery massacre =

1947 massacre of Jewish workers in Haifa

Coordinates: 32.7934°N 35.0519°E

- Part of 1947-1948 civil war in Mandatory Palestine
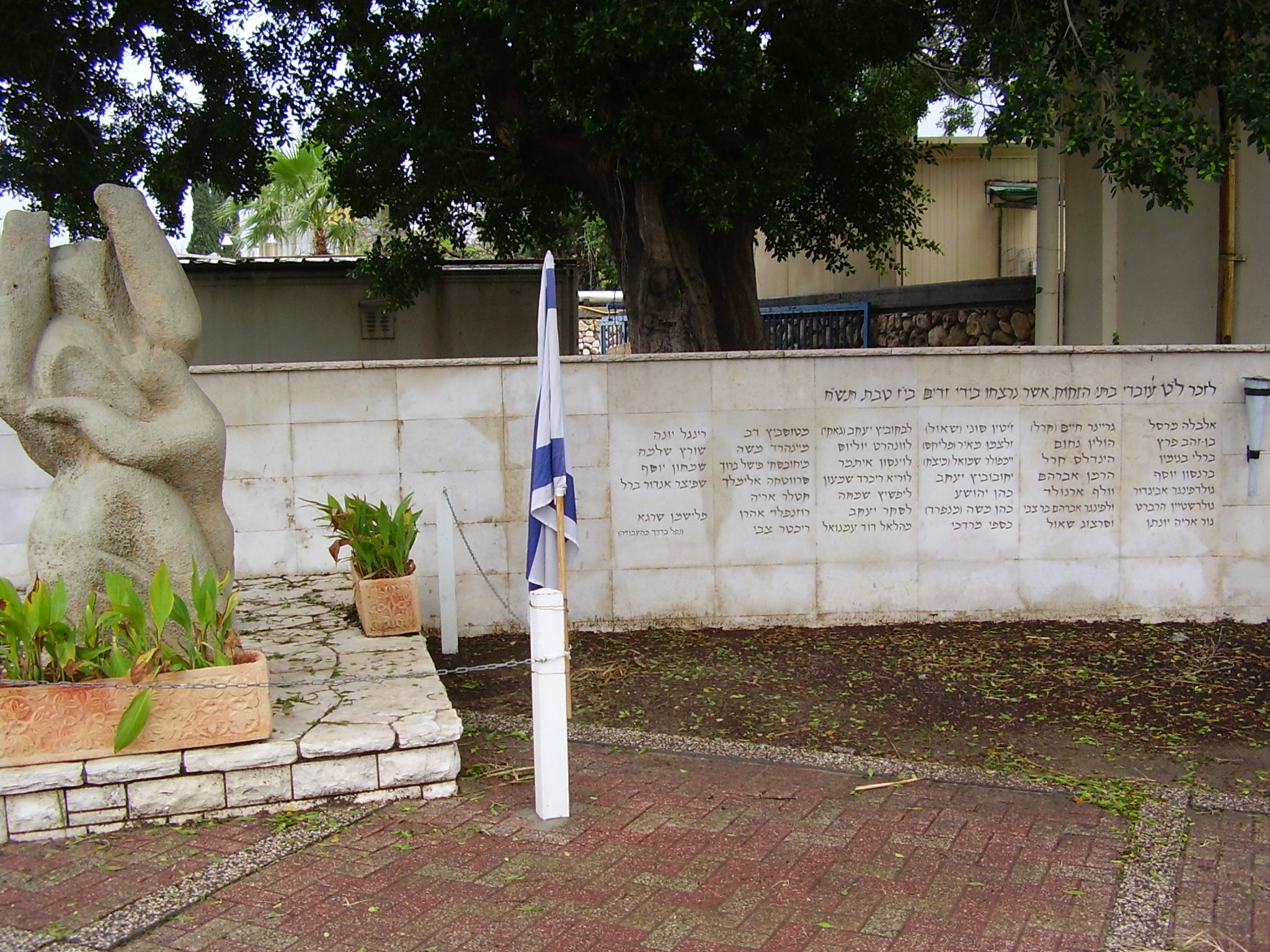
- Memorial at the site of the massacre naming the 39 victims (Note: A 40th name is listed at the bottom of the left-most column for a person who "died on their way from work" (נפל בדרך מהעבודה))
- Location: Haifa
- Date: 30 December 1947
- Target: Jewish workers of Haifa Oil Refinery
- Deaths: 39 (Note: Lockman 1996 writes of 41 deaths)
- Injuries: 49
- Perpetrator: Mob of Palestinian refinery workers

The Haifa Oil Refinery massacre took place on 30 December 1947 in Mandatory Palestine, when 39 Jewish refinery workers were killed by their Arab coworkers in a mass lynching. (Note: Lockman 1996 - "Forty-one Jews had been killed and forty-nine wounded.")

The massacre was a response to an Irgun terrorist attack, where grenades were thrown into a crowd of about 100 day-labourers waiting at a bus stop outside the main gate of the then British-owned Haifa Oil Refinery. Six Arabs were killed and 42 were wounded. (Note: Lockman 1996 – "Six people were killed and forty-two wounded.") Minutes after the Irgun attack, Arab refinery workers and others began attacking the Jewish refinery workers, resulting in 39 deaths (Note: Pappé (2006) says 39, while Lockman (1996) says 41. Only 39 names are acknowledged in the memorial at the site of the massacre) and 49 injuries, before the British Army and Palestine Police units arrived to put an end to the violence. The Haganah later retaliated by attacking two nearby Arab villages in what became known as the Balad al-Shaykh massacre, where between 60 and 70 Arabs were killed.

== Background ==
In 1947 1700 Arabs and 470 Jews worked at the Oil Refinery, not including the British management. Relations between Jews and Arabs at the refinery had been known to be good. However, tensions rose in the wake of the pending 1947 UN Partition Plan and escalating acts of violence led to the outbreak of a civil war in Mandatory Palestine.

On 30 December 1947, Irgun militants hurled two bombs from a passing car into a crowd of Arab workers, 6 workers were killed and 42 wounded. Irgun, who planned and carried out the attack on the day-laborers, said it was in retaliation for recent attacks elsewhere on Jews in Palestine.

== Attack ==
Arab workers stormed the refinery armed with tools and metal rods, beating 39 (Note: Per Pappe 2006 and Morris 2004, though Lockman 1996 writes of 41 deaths) Jewish workers to death and wounding 49. British forces arrived only an hour after the riot started. According to the Jewish Agency, some Arab workers helped their Jewish co-workers hide or escape.

== Aftermath ==
=== Balad al-Shaykh massacre ===
The Jewish Agency condemned the Irgun for the "act of madness" that preceded the killing of Jewish workers at the Haifa oil refinery, but at the same time authorized retaliation. The Haganah mounted a retaliatory raid which became known as the Balad al-Shaykh massacre on the villages of Balad al-Shaykh and nearby Hawassa, where some of the Arab refinery workers lived. They fired into and blew up houses. Between 60 and 70 villagers were killed, including women and children. Zachary Lockman wrote that "the Jewish attackers killed some sixty men, women, and children and destroyed several dozen houses."

== Bibliography ==
- Pappé, Ilan (1999), The Israel/Palestine Question, Routledge, ISBN 978-0-415-16947-9
- Benny Morris, The Birth of The Palestinian Refugee Problem Revisited (2004)
- Ilan Pappe, The Ethnic Cleansing of Palestine (2006)
