= Balad al-Sheikh =

Balad al-Sheikh بلد الشيخ Balad ash-Shaykh
- Village
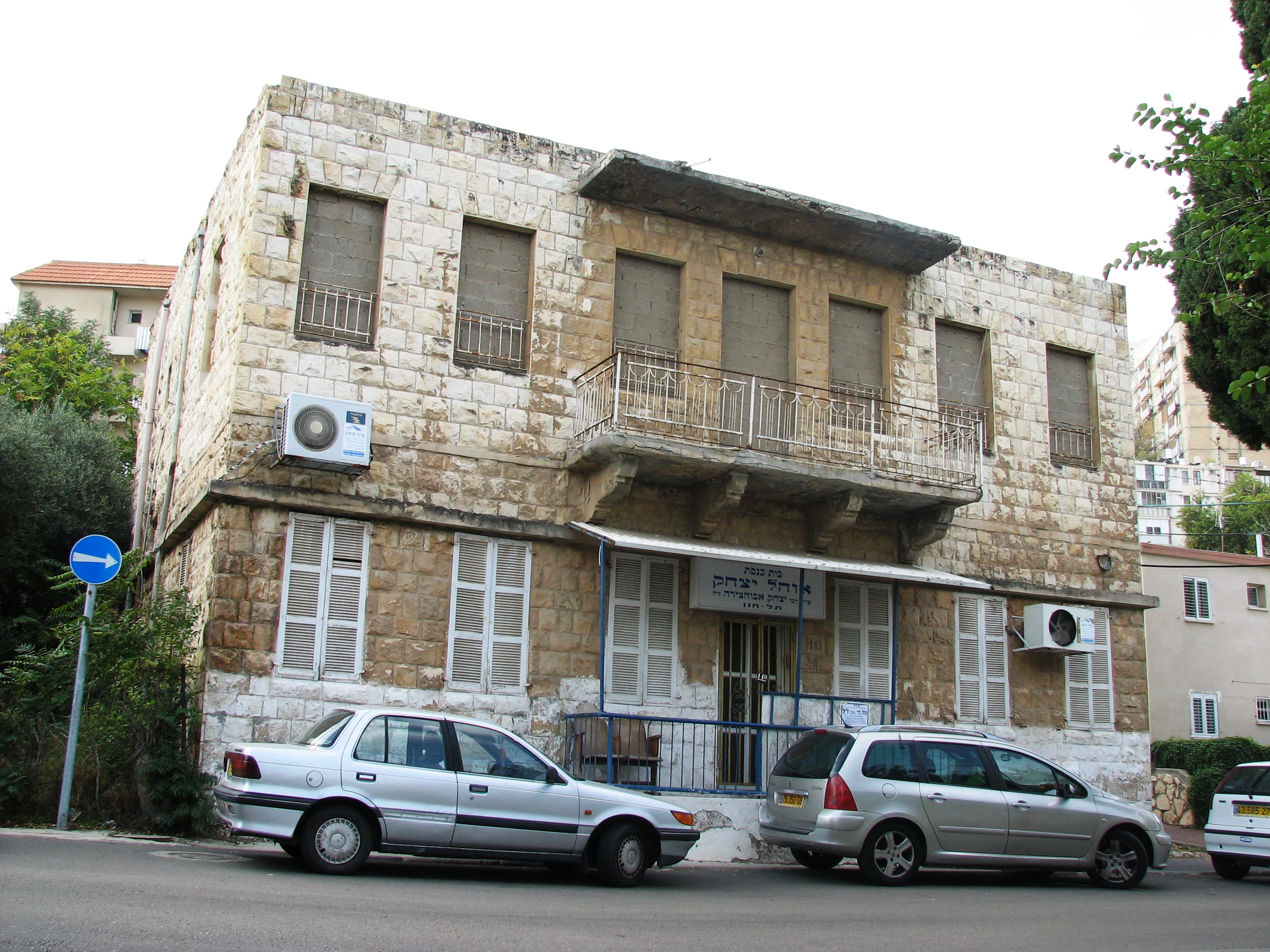
- A house from Balad ash-Sheikh, now Tel Hanan, Nesher
- Etymology: "The town of the sheikh"
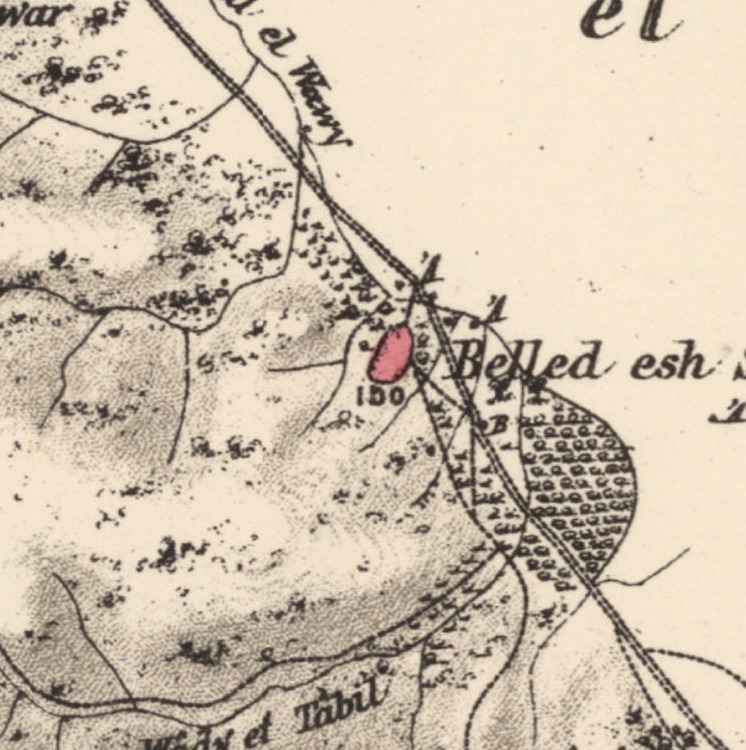
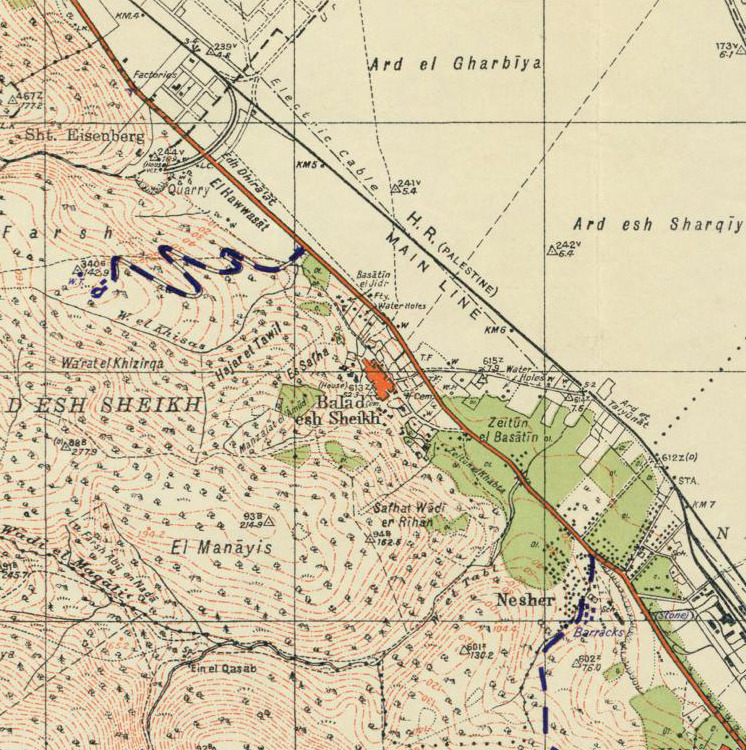
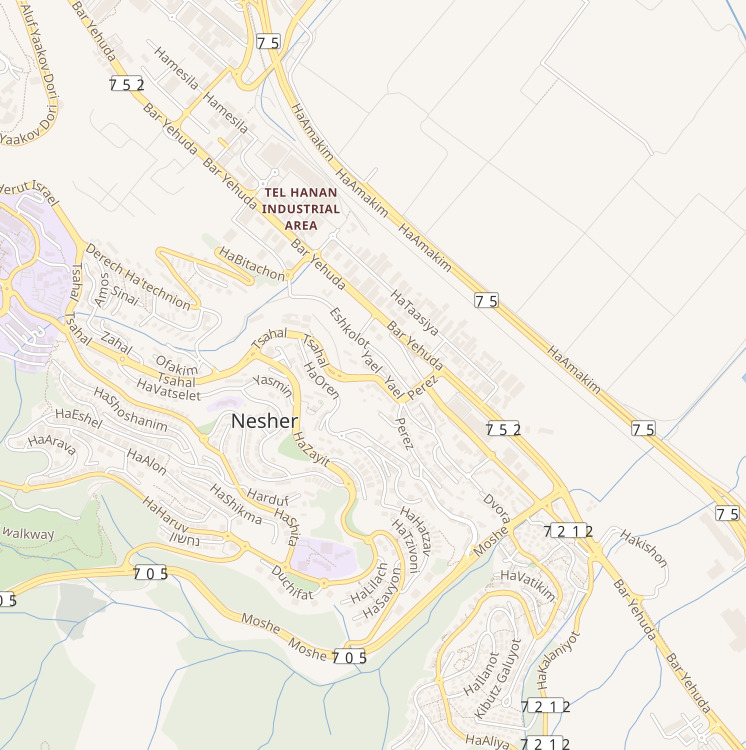
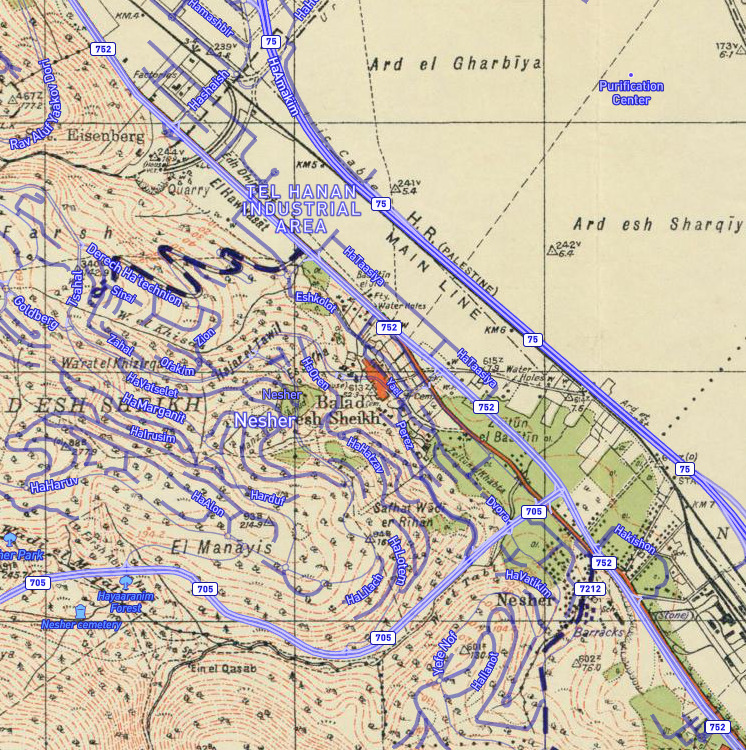
- 1870s map 1940s map modern map 1940s with modern overlay map A series of historical maps of the area around Balad al-Sheikh (click the buttons)

- Location within Mandatory Palestine
- Coordinates: 32°46′21″N 35°02′34″E
- Palestine grid: 154/241
- Geopolitical entity: Mandatory Palestine
- Subdistrict: Haifa
- Date of depopulation: April 25, 1948

Area
  - Total: 9,849 dunams (9.849 km^{2}; 3.803 sq mi)

Population (1945)
  - Total: 4,120
- Cause(s) of depopulation: Military assault by Yishuv forces
- Secondary cause: Influence of nearby town's fall
- Current Localities: Nesher

Balad al-Sheikh (traditional transliteration) or Balad ash-Shaykh (most recent form of transliteration; Arabic: بلد الشيخ) was a Palestinian Arab village located just north of Mount Carmel, 7 kilometers (4.3 mi) southeast of Haifa. Currently the town's land is located within the jurisdiction of the Israeli city, Nesher.

== History ==
=== Ottoman era ===
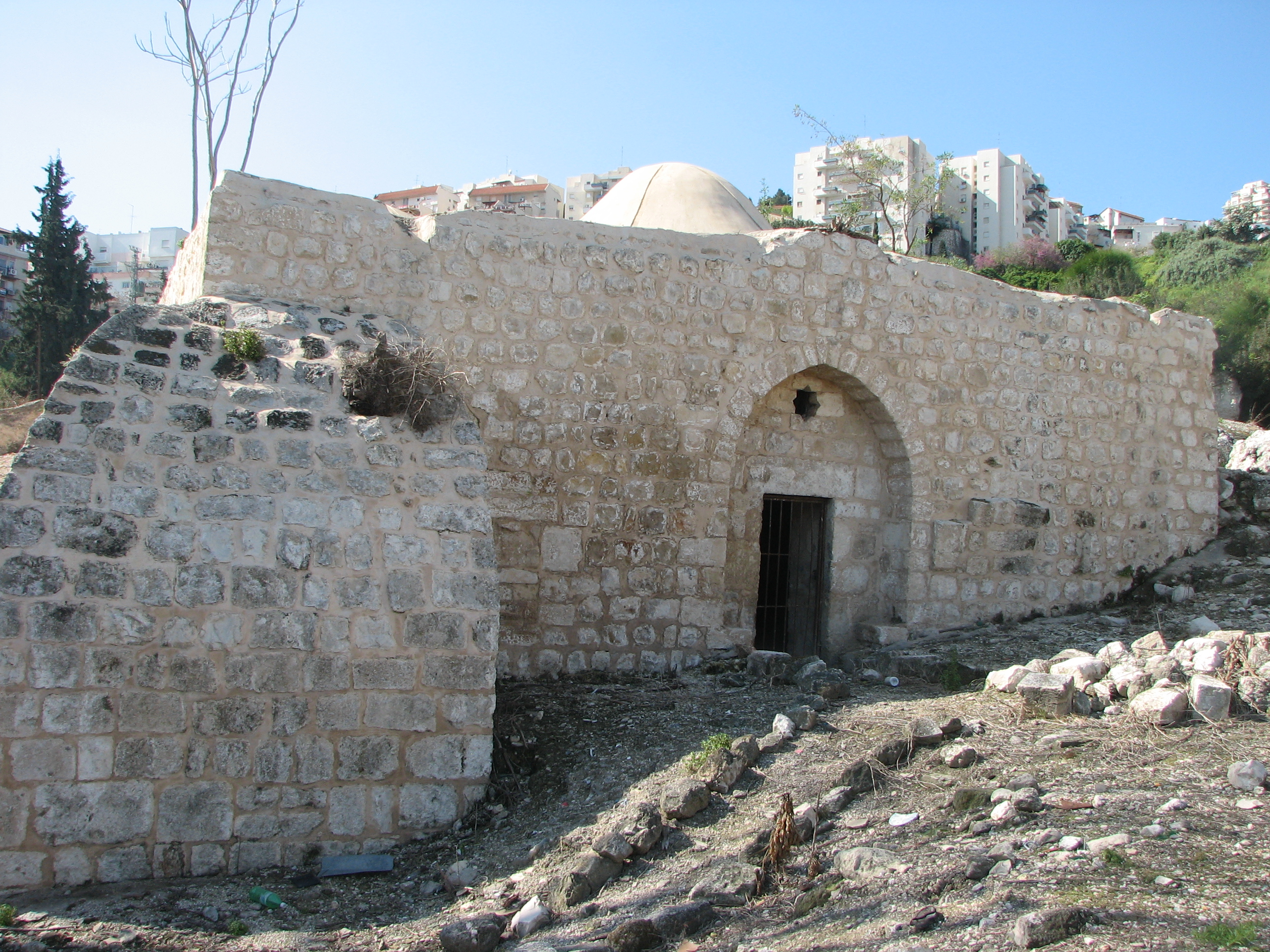
The maqam of Sheikh Abdallah Al-Sahli in Balad al-Sheikh, 2010

The town is named after Sheikh Abdallah Al-Sahli, a renowned Sufi, who was granted the taxes collected from the village by Sultan Salim II (1566–1574). The village contains a maqam ("shrine") dedicated to him. His grave is located in the Balad Al-Sheikh cemetery on Mount Carmel.

In 1816, British traveller James Silk Buckingham passed by "Belled-el-Sheikh".

In 1859, the village had an estimated "200 souls", and the tillage was 20 feddans, while in 1875, Victor Guérin estimated that the village had a population of 500. He described that the houses were built by successive stages, one above the other; and almost all had a cabin made with tree branches at the top. This was where, during the summer, people spend the night to get cooler. Guérin further noted that at the lower end of the village were "cultivated gardens, surrounded by cactus and planted with olive, pomegranate and fig trees, and dominated by the elegant stems of several palm trees".

In 1881, the PEF's Survey of Western Palestine described it as "a moderate-sized village at the foot of Carmel, with good springs below near the road, and olive gardens with a few palm trees".

=== British Mandate era ===
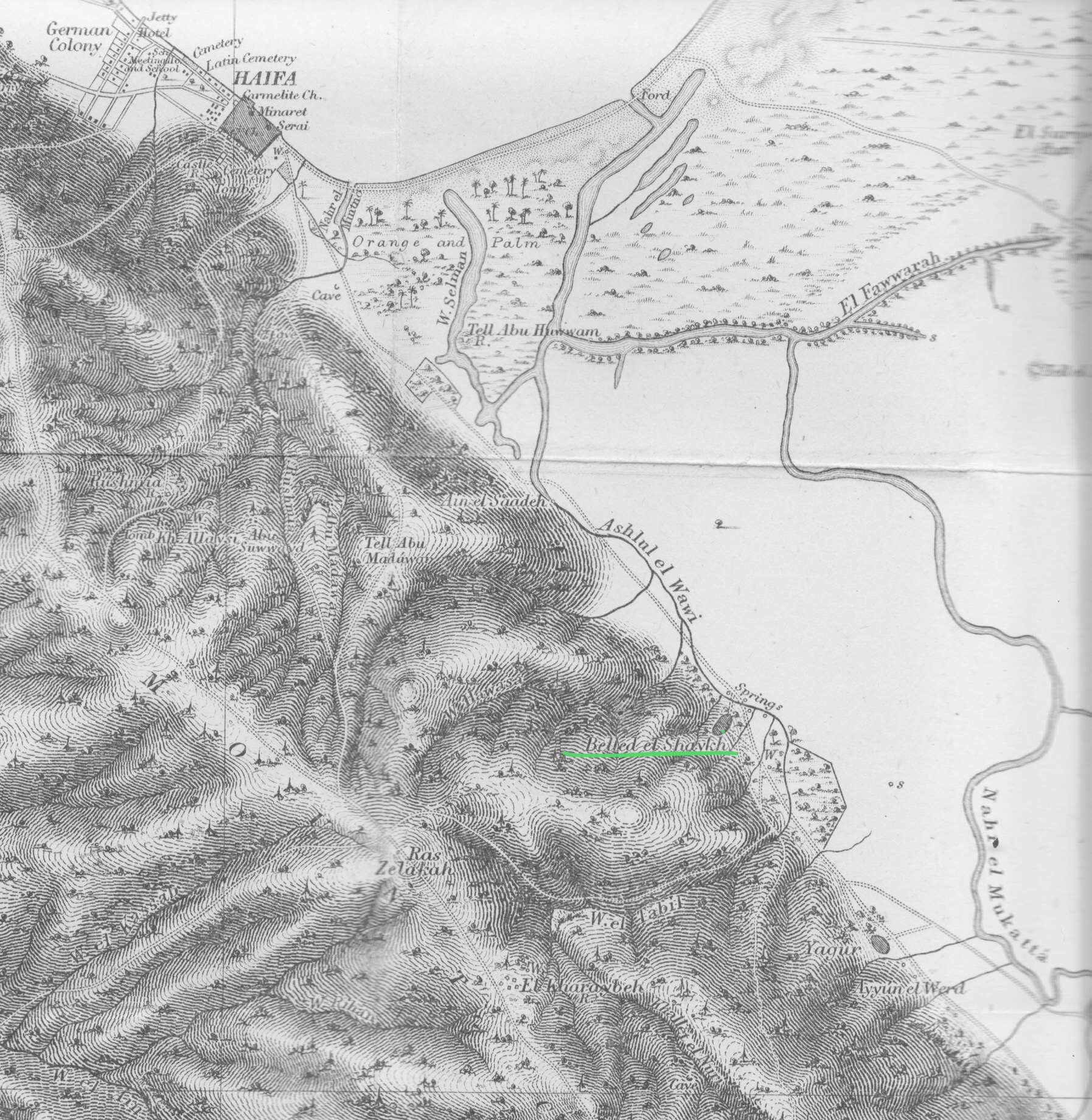
Palestine Exploration Fund map. 1875

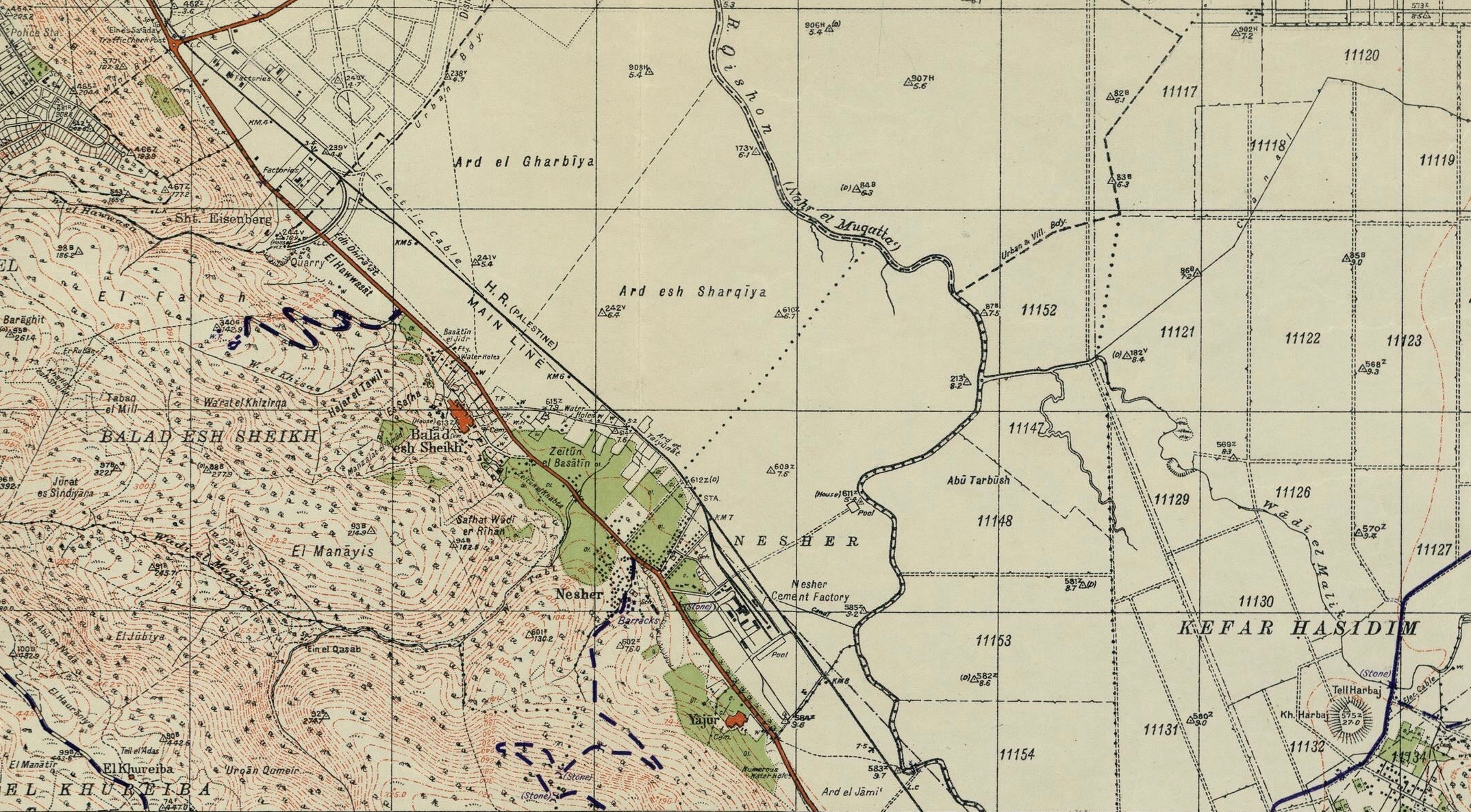
Balad al-Sheikh 1942 1:20,000

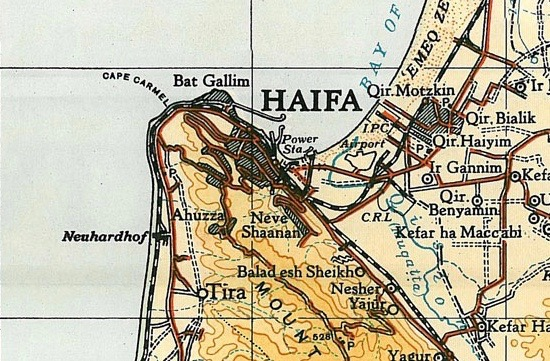
Balad al-Sheikh 1945 1:250,000

In the 1922 census of Palestine, conducted by the British Mandate authorities, Balad al Shaikh had a population of 406; 405 Muslims and 1 Christian, where the one Christian was a Melkite. This had increasing in the 1931 census to 747 Muslims, including Bedouin tribes that lived nearby, in a total of 247 houses.

The Jezreel Valley railway line passed about 0.5 kilometers (0.31 mi) east of the village. The Balad al-Sheikh Railway Station, also known as Shumariyyah (Şumariye in Turkish) and after 1948 as Tel Hanan, was built in 1904 as the second station in the original line. In 1913, the Ottomans built an extension of the valley line to Acre, with this station serving as terminus. When the Haganah attacked Balad al-Sheikh on the night of December 31, 1947 – January 1, 1948, Hanan Zelinger of the Haganah was killed in the operation. A Jewish village, Tel Hanan (now part of the town of Nesher), was built there in his name.

The village was the source of attacks on Jews in 1929 when its residents attacked the local cement factory and burned down a women's farm. In 1934, a new cemetery for Muslim residents of Haifa, was established near the village and in 1935 Izz ad-Din al-Qassam was buried there, making the area a source of tension between Jews and Arabs.

During the 1936–39 Arab revolt in Palestine, there were frequent attacks on Jewish passenger buses near Balad al-Sheikh. In May 1936, a police station was opened in Balad al-Sheikh in an attempt to crack down on the attacks on Jewish buses and property. On May 21, 1936, a Jewish bus was shot at when it was passing the village. In October 1936, an engagement between Arab militants and the British military, supported by aircraft, took place near the village. On February 22, 1937, two British policemen were attacked in the village, one was killed. It was stated that he was killed because he took part in the investigations of the murder of three Jews at Yagur in 1931.

Additional attacks on Jewish buses occurred from July to October 1938.

On July 13, 1938, two buses were shot and stoned; one of them was set on fire. On April 18, 1939, a wide military and police search was conducted in Balad esh Sheikh looking for the suspects of the killings in Haifa. A large number of Arabs were interrogated and ten were arrested.

On May 26, 1939, Mordechai Shechtman, a train driver, was shot in the head by two Arabs who ambushed him at the railroad switch stop near Balad-el Sheikh. He died soon thereafter.

According to the British Population Survey - Village Statistics, 1945, the town had a total land area of 9,849 Turkish dunams, although only 5,844 dunams were privately owned by Arabs; most of the remainder was public property. In 1945, the town had a population of 4,120 Muslim inhabitants making it one of the larger localities in the area. Of the land, Arabs used 386 dunams for plantations and irrigable land, 4,410 for cereals, while 221 dunams were built-up (urban) land.

=== 1948 Palestine war ===
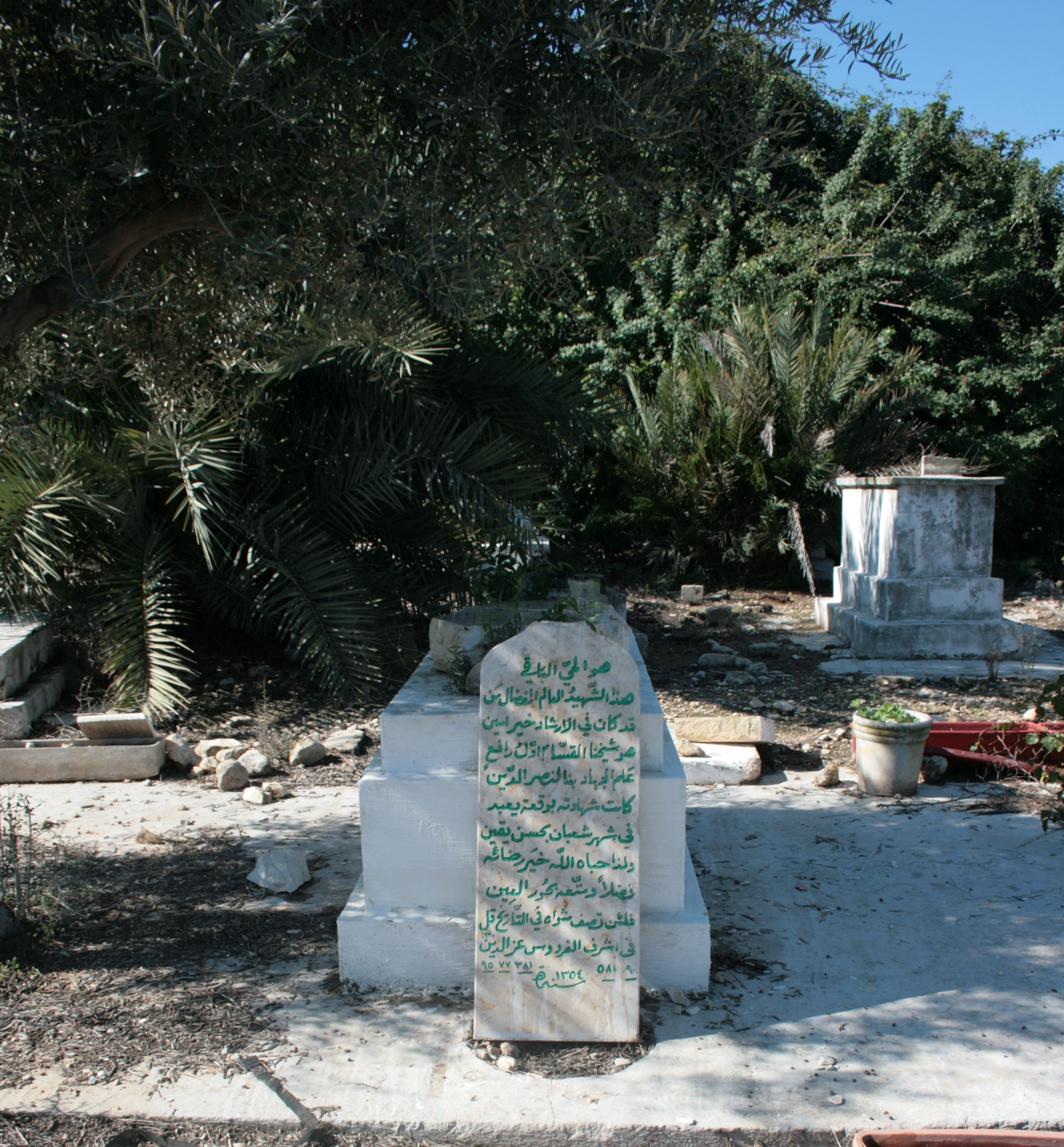
Grave of Izz al-Din al-Qassam who was buried in The Muslim cemetery of Haifa in Nesher in 1935

On December 2, 1947, shots were fired at a bus that was bringing workers from the cement factory in Nesher to their homes and was passing by the road near the village. On December 8, 1947, a car from Kibbutz Gvat was attacked by Arabs who had set up roadblocks on the road. In this attack, two Jews, from Kibbutz Gvat, were killed. On December 10, 1947, a patrol of Jewish Settlement Police that was escorting Jewish buses on the road, fired on a number of Arabs that blocked the road near the village. Several families left the village. A Haganah attack on the village on December 11 or 12th killed six Palestinians. (Note: Morris 2004, "The first large Haganah reprisal, against the village of Balad al Sheikh, just east of Haifa, took place on 12 December (six Arabs were killed)") (Note: Date of December 11, 1946 in Saleh Abdel Jawad, (2007). Zionist Massacres: the Creation of the Palestinian Refugee Problem in the 1948 War. In: Benvenisti, E., Gans, C., Hanafi, S. (eds) Israel and the Palestinian Refugees. Beiträge zum ausländischen öffentlichen Recht und Völkerrecht, vol 189. Springer, Berlin, Heidelberg. https://doi.org/10.1007/978-3-540-68161-8_3.)

Following the attacks, the Jewish transportation stopped for a while to travel through the village. The transportation from Haifa to Nesher, Yagur and Jezreel Valley travelled through Check Post junction, Krayot, Kfar Hasidim and Yagur.

On December 30, 1947, a grenade attack by Irgun killed 6 Arab civilians in front of the Haifa Oil Refinery, after which the Arab crowd went in and killed 39 Jewish refinery workers. On December 31, 1947, the Balad Al Sheikh massacre occurred in which 170 men from the Palmach entered the village with orders to 'encircle the village, harm the largest possible number of men, damage property, and refrain from attacking women and children.' Despite these orders, women and children were counted among the dead with dozens of houses destroyed. According to Israeli historian Aryeh Yitzhaki, the attack was carried out by a combination of Palmach and Haganah forces who entered the town and fought mostly inside the houses, resulting in mostly non-combatant casualties. Following the attack, on January 7, 1948, part of the residents of the village left and were replaced by Arab volunteers who came from Haifa to defend the village.

In early April 1948, a unit of the Arab Legion that had garrisoned the village left the area. This led the villagers to abandon the houses in the southeastern part of the village, near the Legion camp and move to the village center.

On April 22, after the Battle of Haifa, the vast majority of Haifa's non-Jewish fled in attempt to avoid the violence of the Haganah and other armed Zionist militias. At the same time, many of Balad ash-Sheikh's residents left the village, including women and children.

On April 24, 1948, the Carmeli Brigade a unit of the Haganah surrounded the village, asking the residents to hand over all their weapons. They handed them 22 old and useless rifles and asked for ceasefire. The Haganah replied that they should hand over all their weapons. The residents did not reply, instead they asked the British Army for help. On April 25, at 05:00 AM, the Haganah fired several shells from three-inch mortars. Many adults male fled and left the women and children behind. A British army unit that came at 06:00 reported that there was almost no return fire from the village. The British advised the villagers to leave the village and they did it with British escort.

According to a February 26, 2026 Haaretz investigation, the released archival materials also describe cases of deliberate killings carried out as acts of revenge for the deaths of Jewish fighters, including at Balad al-Shaykh. The report states that in some instances violence was motivated by retaliatory impulses following the loss of comrades during combat operations.

In 1949, Balad Al-Sheikh was resettled by Israelis who occupied most of the Arab houses, renaming the area Tel Chanan, which is now considered part of the Nesher township.

== Present ==
Most of the fleeing or exiled residents of Balad Al-Sheikh are internally displaced Palestinians and presently reside in various Arab neighborhoods in Haifa or Acre.

Walid Khalidi, a prominent Palestinian historian, described the town in 1992:

Many of the Arab houses and shops are still standing and are occupied by the settlement's inhabitants. The cemetery is visible and is in a state of neglect.

== See also ==
- List of villages depopulated during the Arab-Israeli conflict

== Bibliography ==
- Barron, J.B., ed. (1923). Palestine: Report and General Abstracts of the Census of 1922. Government of Palestine.
- Buckingham, J.S. (1821). Travels in Palestine through the countries of Bashan and Gilead, east of the River Jordan, including a visit to the cities of Geraza and Gamala in the Decapolis. London: Longman, Hurst, Rees, Orme and Brown.
- Conder, C.R.; Kitchener, H.H. (1881). The Survey of Western Palestine: Memoirs of the Topography, Orography, Hydrography, and Archaeology. Vol. 1. London: Committee of the Palestine Exploration Fund.
- Department of Statistics (1945). Village Statistics, April, 1945. Government of Palestine.
- Guérin, V. (1880). Description Géographique Historique et Archéologique de la Palestine (in French). Vol. 3: Galilee, pt. 1. Paris: L'Imprimerie Nationale.
- Hadawi, S. (1970). Village Statistics of 1945: A Classification of Land and Area ownership in Palestine. Palestine Liberation Organization Research Center.
- Khalidi, W. (1992). All That Remains: The Palestinian Villages Occupied and Depopulated by Israel in 1948. Washington D.C.: Institute for Palestine Studies. ISBN 0-88728-224-5.
- Mills, E., ed. (1932). Census of Palestine 1931. Population of Villages, Towns and Administrative Areas. Jerusalem: Government of Palestine.
- Morris, B. (2004). The Birth of the Palestinian Refugee Problem Revisited. Cambridge University Press. ISBN 978-0-521-00967-6.
- Morris, B. (2008). 1948: A History of the First Arab-Israeli War. Yale University Press. ISBN 9780300126969.
- Mülinen, Egbert Friedrich von 1908, Beiträge zur Kenntnis des Karmels "Separateabdruck aus der Zeitschrift des Deutschen Palëstina-Vereins Band XXX (1907) Seite 117-207 und Band XXXI (1908) Seite 1-258." Beled esch-schech: p.175 ff.
- Palmer, E.H. (1881). The Survey of Western Palestine: Arabic and English Name Lists Collected During the Survey by Lieutenants Conder and Kitchener, R. E. Transliterated and Explained by E.H. Palmer. Committee of the Palestine Exploration Fund.
- Petersen, Andrew (2001). A Gazetteer of Buildings in Muslim Palestine (British Academy Monographs in Archaeology). Vol. 1. Oxford University Press. ISBN 978-0-19-727011-0. p. 108-109
