= Amin al-Husseini =

Palestinian Arab nationalist (1897–1974)

- محمد أمين الحسيني
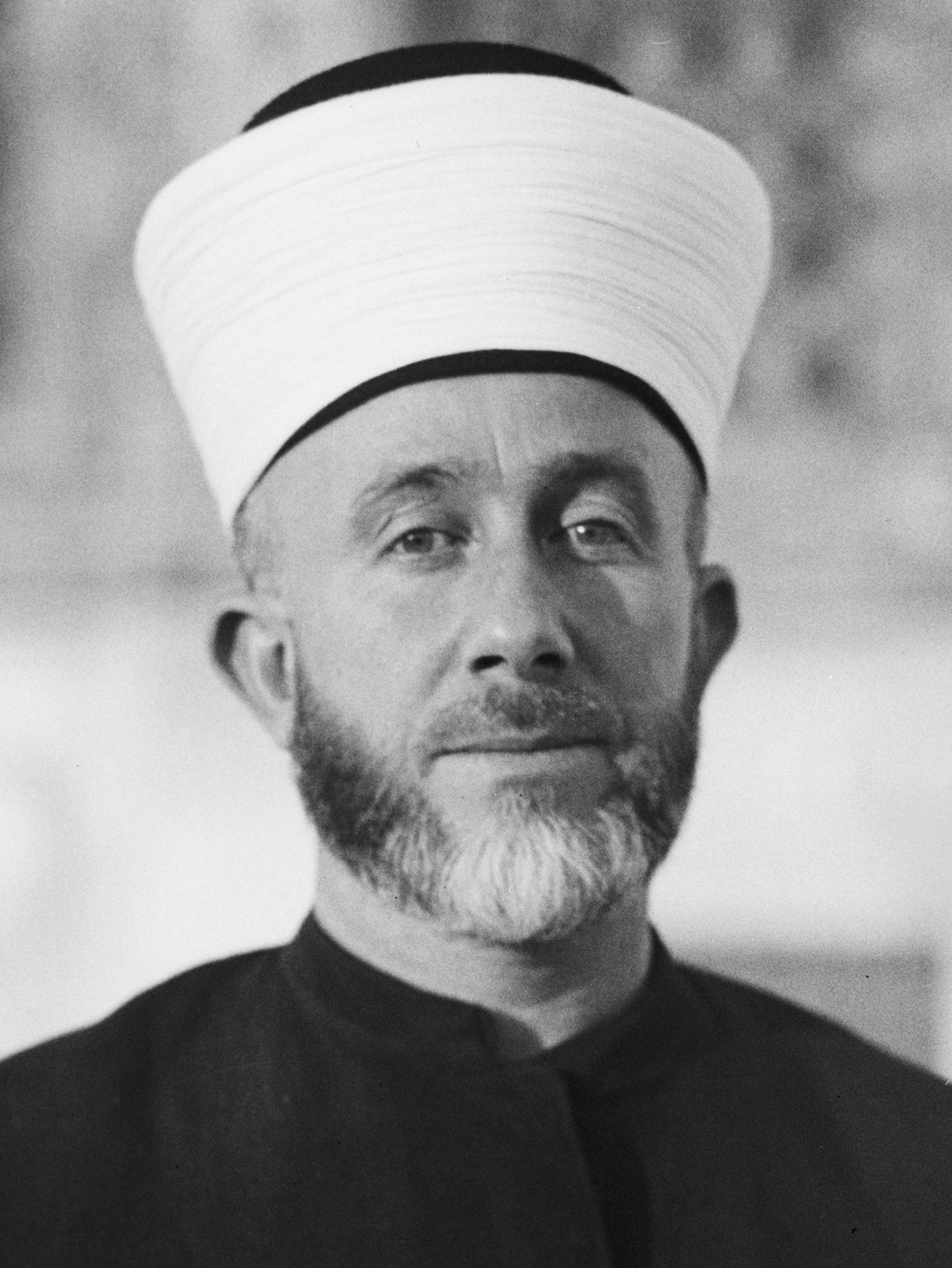
- Amin al-Husseini in 1929

Personal life
- Born: Mohammed Amin al-Husseini c. 1897 (Note: Mattar, writing on the uncertainty of al-Husseini's birthdate, notes that he wrote both 1895 and 1896 on official documents between 1921 and 1934, which Mattar suggests was due to both years corresponding to 1313 A.H. in the Islamic calendar. Mattar found no documentary evidence for Husseini's claim, written later in life, that he was born in 1897. (See Mattar 1992, p. 156.) Laurens argues that 1897 was his likely date of birth, suggesting he was induced by circumstances to assert that he was older when giving various dates for his birth, ranging from 1893 to 1897. (See Laurens 2002, p. 624, n.5.) Laurens, in the first volume of his trilogy (Laurens 1999, p. 425), had used Mattar's dating of 1895, but revised this to 1897 as more probable in his second volume.) Jerusalem, Ottoman Empire
- Died: 4 July 1974 (aged approx. 76–77) Beirut, Lebanon
- Political party: Arab Higher Committee

Religious life
- Religion: Islam
- Denomination: Sunni
- School: Hanafi

Grand Mufti of Jerusalem
- In office 1921–1937
- Preceded by: Kamil al-Husayni
- Succeeded by: Hussam ad-Din Jarallah

President of the Supreme Muslim Council
- In office 9 January 1922 – 1937
- Preceded by: Post established

President of All-Palestine
- In office 22 September 1948 – 1953
- Prime Minister: Ahmed Hilmi Abd al-Baqi
- Preceded by: Post established
- Succeeded by: Yasser Arafat (1989)

Military service
- Allegiance: Ottoman Empire (until 1918); United Kingdom (1920–1937); Nazi Germany and Kingdom of Italy (1941–1945)

Mohammed Amin al-Husseini (Arabic: محمد أمين الحسيني; c. 1897 – 4 July 1974) was a Palestinian Arab nationalist and Muslim leader in Mandatory Palestine. He was the scion of the al-Husayni family of Jerusalemite Arab nobles, who trace their origins to the Islamic prophet Muhammad.

Husseini was born in Jerusalem, Ottoman Empire in 1897, he received education in Islamic, Ottoman, and Catholic schools. In 1912, he pursued Salafist religious studies in Cairo. Husseini later went on to serve in the Ottoman army during World War I. At war's end he stationed himself in Damascus as a supporter of the Arab Kingdom of Syria, but following its disestablishment, he moved back to Jerusalem, shifting his pan-Arabism to a form of Palestinian nationalism. From as early as 1920, he actively opposed Zionism, and as a leader of the 1920 Nebi Musa riots, was sentenced for ten years imprisonment but pardoned by the British. In 1921, Herbert Samuel, the British High Commissioner appointed him Grand Mufti of Jerusalem, a position he used to promote Islam while rallying a non-confessional Arab nationalism against Zionism. During the 1921–1936 period, he was considered an important ally by the British authorities. His appointment by the British for the role of grand mufti of all Palestine (a new role established by the British) helped divide the Palestinian leadership structure and national movement.

In 1937, evading an arrest warrant for aligning himself against British rule as leader of the 1936–1939 Arab revolt in Palestine, he fled and took refuge in Lebanon and afterwards Iraq. He then established himself in Fascist Italy and Nazi Germany, which he collaborated with during World War II against Britain, requesting during a meeting with Adolf Hitler backing for Arab independence and opposition to the establishment of a Jewish national home in Palestine. Upon the end of the war, he came under French protection, and then sought refuge in Cairo. In the lead-up to the 1948 Palestine war, Husseini opposed both the 1947 UN Partition Plan and Jordan's plan to annex the West Bank. Failing to gain command of the Arab League's Arab Liberation Army, Husseini built his own militia, the Holy War Army. In September 1948 he participated in the establishment of an All-Palestine Government in Egyptian-ruled Gaza, but this government won limited recognition and was eventually dissolved by Egypt in 1959. After the war and the 1948 Palestinian expulsion and flight, his claims to leadership were discredited and he was eventually sidelined by the establishment of the Palestine Liberation Organization in 1964. He died in Beirut, Lebanon, in July 1974.

Husseini was and remains a highly controversial figure. Historians dispute whether his fierce opposition to Zionism was grounded in nationalism or antisemitism, or a combination of both. Opponents of Palestinian nationalism have pointed to Husseini's wartime residence and propaganda activities in Nazi Germany to associate the Palestinian national movement with antisemitism in Europe.

== Early life ==
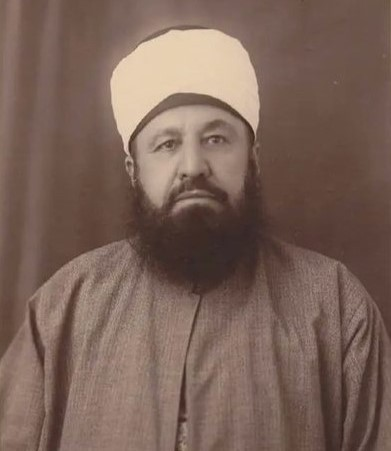
Al-Husseini's mentor, Muhammad Rashid Rida, a Syrian Sunni cleric noteworthy for his vehement opposition to Zionist movement and Western ideals

Amin al-Husseini was born around 1897 in Jerusalem, the son of the mufti of that city and prominent early opponent of Zionism, Tahir al-Husayni. The al-Husseini clan consisted of wealthy landowners in southern Palestine, centered around the district of Jerusalem. Thirteen members of the clan had been Mayors of Jerusalem between 1864 and 1920. Another member of the clan and Amin's half-brother, Kamil al-Husayni, also served as Mufti of Jerusalem. In Jerusalem Amin al-Husseini attended a Qur'an school (kuttub), and Ottoman government secondary school (rüshidiyye) where he learned Turkish, and a Catholic secondary school run by French missionaries, the Catholic Frères, where he learned French. He also studied at the Alliance Israélite Universelle with its Jewish director Albert Antébi. Antébi considered al-Husseini his pupil, and refers to him in a letter. (Note: See Elizabeth Antébi, L'homme du Sérail, NiL, Paris, 1996, p. 563.)

In 1912 he studied Islamic law briefly at Al-Azhar University in Cairo and at the Dar al-Da'wa wa-l-Irshad, under Rashid Rida, a salafi scholar, who was to remain Amin's mentor till his death in 1935. Rashid Rida's defense of traditional Islamic values and hostility to Westernization became a major component of Al-Husseini's religious persona. Like Rida, he believed that the West was waging a War against Islam and encouraged Islamic revolutions across the Muslim World to defeat European colonial powers and Zionism. However, Al-Husseini did not adopt his teacher's Islamic fundamentalism.

Though groomed to hold religious office from youth, his education was typical of the Ottoman effendi at the time, and he only donned a religious turban in 1921 after being appointed mufti. In 1913, approximately at the age of 16, al-Husseini accompanied his mother Zainab to Mecca and received the honorary title of Hajji. Prior to World War I, he studied at the School of Administration in Constantinople, the most secular of Ottoman institutions.

== World War I ==
With the outbreak of World War I in 1914, al-Husseini received a commission in the Ottoman Army as an artillery officer and was assigned to the Forty-Seventh Brigade stationed in and around the city of İzmir. In November 1916 he obtained a three-month disability leave from the army and returned to Jerusalem. He was recovering from an illness there when the city was captured by the British a year later. The British and Sherifian armies, for which some 500 Palestinian Arabs were estimated to have volunteered, completed their conquest of Ottoman-controlled Palestine and Syria in 1918. As a Sherifian officer, al-Husseini recruited men to serve in Faisal bin Al Hussein bin Ali El-Hashemi's army during the Arab Revolt, a task he undertook while employed as a recruiter by the British military administration in Jerusalem and Damascus. The post-war Palin Report noted that the English recruiting officer, Captain C. D. Brunton, found al-Husseini, with whom he cooperated, very pro-British, and that, via the diffusion of War Office pamphlets dropped from the air promising them peace and prosperity under British rule, "the recruits (were) being given to understand that they were fighting in a national cause and to liberate their country from the Turks". Nothing in his early career to this point suggests he had ambitions to serve in a religious office: his interests were those of an Arab nationalist.

== Early political activism ==
In 1919, al-Husseini attended the Pan-Syrian Congress held in Damascus where he supported Emir Faisal for King of Syria. That year al-Husseini founded the pro-British Jerusalem branch of the Syrian-based "Arab Club" (Al-Nadi al-arabi), which then vied with the Nashashibi-sponsored "Literary Club" (al-Muntada al-Adabi) for influence over public opinion, and he soon became its president. At the same time, he wrote articles for the Suriyya al-Janubiyya (Southern Syria). The paper was published in Jerusalem beginning in September 1919 by the lawyer Muhammad Hassan al-Budayri, and edited by Aref al-Aref, both prominent members of al-Nadi al-'Arabi.

Al-Husseini was a strong supporter of the short-living Arab Kingdom of Syria, established in March 1920. In addition to his support to pan-Arabist policies of King Faisal I, al-Husseini tried to destabilize the British rule in Palestine, which was declared to be part of the Arab Kingdom, even though no authority was exercised in reality.

During the annual Nabi Musa procession in Jerusalem in April 1920, violent rioting broke out in protest at the implementation of the Balfour Declaration which supported the establishment in Palestine of a homeland for the Jewish people. Much damage to Jewish life and property was caused. The Palin Report laid the blame for the explosion of tensions on both sides. Ze'ev Jabotinsky, organiser of Jewish paramilitary defences, received a 15-year sentence. Al-Husseini, then a teacher at the Rashidiya school, near Herod's Gate in East Jerusalem, was charged with inciting the Arab crowds with an inflammatory speech and sentenced in absentia to 10-years imprisonment by a military court, since by then he had fled to Syria. It was asserted soon after, by Chaim Weizmann and British army Lieutenant Colonel Richard Meinertzhagen, who worked in close concert, (Note: "Meinertzhagen et Weizmann sont en contacts permanents et coordonnent leur action" (Laurens 1999, p. 495)) that al-Husseini had been put up to inciting the riot by British Field-marshal Allenby's Chief of Staff, Colonel Bertie Harry Waters-Taylor, to demonstrate to the world that Arabs would not tolerate a Jewish homeland in Palestine. The assertion was never proven, and Meinertzhagen was dismissed.

After the April riots an event took place that turned the traditional rivalry between the Husseini and Nashashibi clans into a serious rift, with long-term consequences for al-Husseini and Palestinian nationalism. According to Sir Louis Bols, great pressure was brought to bear on the military administration from Zionist leaders and officials such as David Yellin, to have the mayor of Jerusalem, Musa Kazim Pasha al-Husayni, dismissed, given his presence in the demonstration of the previous March. Colonel Storrs, the Military Governor of Jerusalem, removed him without further inquiry, replacing him with Raghib al-Nashashibi of the rival Nashashibi clan. This, according to the Palin report, "had a profound effect on his co-religionists, definitely confirming the conviction they had already formed from other evidence that the Civil Administration was the mere puppet of the Zionist Organization."

Until late 1920, al-Husseini focused his efforts on Pan-Arabism and the ideology of a Greater Syria in particular, with Palestine understood as a southern province of an Arab state, whose capital was to be established in Damascus. Greater Syria was to include territory of the entire Levant, now occupied by Syria, Lebanon, Jordan, Palestinian Authority and Israel. The struggle for Greater Syria collapsed after France defeated the Arab forces in Battle of Maysalun in July 1920. The French army entered Damascus at that time, overthrew King Faisal and put an end to the project of a Greater Syria, put under the French Mandate in accordance with the prior Sykes-Picot Agreement. Palestinian notables responded to the disaster by a series of resolutions at the 1921 Haifa conference, which set down a Palestinian framework and passed over in silence the earlier idea of a south confederated with Syria. This framework set the tone of Palestinian nationalism for the ensuing decades.

Al-Husseini, like many of his class and period, then turned from Damascus-oriented Pan-Arabism to a specifically Palestinian ideology, centered on Jerusalem, which sought to block Jewish immigration to Mandatory Palestine. The frustration of pan-Arab aspirations lent an Islamic colour to the struggle for independence, and increasing resort to the idea of restoring the land to Dar al-Islam. From his election as Mufti until 1923, al-Husseini exercised total control over the secret society, Al-Fida'iyya ("The Self-Sacrificers"), which, together with al-Ikha' wal-'Afaf ("Brotherhood and Purity"), played an important role in clandestine anti-British and anti-Zionist activities, and, via members in the gendarmerie, had engaged in riotous activities as early as April 1920.

== Mufti of Jerusalem ==
Sir Herbert Samuel, recently appointed British High Commissioner, declared a general amnesty for those convicted of complicity in the riots of 1920, excluding only Amin al-Husseini and Al Aref. During a visit later that year to the Bedouin tribes of Transjordan who harboured the two political refugees, Samuel offered a pardon to both and Al Aref accepted with alacrity. Husseini initially rebuffed the offer, on the grounds that he was not a criminal. He accepted the pardon only in the wake of the death of his half-brother, the mufti Kamil al-Husayni, in March 1921. Elections were then held, and of the four candidates running for the office of Mufti, al-Husseini received the fewest votes, the first three being Nashashibi candidates. Nevertheless, Samuel was anxious to keep a balance between the al-Husseinis and their rival clan the Nashashibis. A year earlier the British had replaced Musa al-Husayni as Mayor of Jerusalem with Raghib al-Nashashibi. They then moved to secure for the Husseini clan a compensatory function of prestige by appointing one of them to the position of mufti, and, with the support of Raghib al-Nashashibi, prevailing upon the Nashashibi front-runner, Sheikh Hussam ad-Din Jarallah, to withdraw. This automatically promoted Amin al-Husseini to third position, which, under Ottoman law, allowed him to qualify, and Samuel then chose him as Mufti. His initial appointment was as Mufti, but when the Supreme Muslim Council was created in the following year, Husseini demanded and received the title Grand Mufti that had earlier been created, perhaps on the lines of Egyptian usage, by the British for his half-brother Kamil. The position came with a life tenure.

In 1922, al-Husseini was elected president of the Supreme Muslim Council which had been created by Samuel in 1921. Matthews argues that the British considered the combinations of his profile as an effective Arab nationalist and a scion of a noble Jerusalem family "made it advantageous to align his interests with those of the British administration and thereby keep him on a short tether.". The Council controlled the Waqf funds, worth annually tens of thousands of pounds and the orphan funds, worth annually about £50,000, as compared to the £600,000 in the Jewish Agency's annual budget. In addition, he controlled the Islamic courts in Palestine. Among other functions, these courts were entrusted with the power to appoint teachers and preachers.

The British initially balanced appointments to the Supreme Muslim Council between the Husseinis and their supporters (known as the majlisiya, or council supporters) and the Nashashibis and their allied clans (known as the mu'aridun, the opposition). The mu'aridun, were more disposed to a compromise with the Jews, and indeed had for some years received annual subventions from the Jewish Agency. During most of the period of the British mandate, bickering between these two families seriously undermined any Palestinian Arab unity. In 1936, however, they achieved a measure of concerted policy when all the Palestinian Arab groups joined to create a permanent executive organ known as the Arab Higher Committee under al-Husseini's chairmanship.

=== Haram ash-Sharif and the Western Wall ===
The Supreme Muslim Council and its head al-Husseini, who regarded himself as guardian of one of the three holy sites of Islam, launched an international campaign in Muslim countries to gather funds to restore and improve the Haram ash-Sharif (Noble Sanctuary) or Temple Mount, and particularly the Al-Aqsa Mosque and the Dome of the Rock shrine (which houses also the holiest site in Judaism). The whole area required extensive restoration, given the disrepair into which it had fallen from neglect in Ottoman times. Jerusalem was the original direction towards which Muslims prayed, until the Qibla was reorientated towards Mecca by Mohammed in the year 624. Al-Husseini commissioned the Turkish architect Mimar Kemalettin. In restoring the site, al-Husseini was also assisted by the Mandatory power's Catholic Director of Antiquities, Ernest Richmond. Under Richmond's supervision, the Turkish architect drew up a plan, and the execution of the works gave a notable stimulus to the revival of traditional artisan arts like mosaic tessellation, glassware production, woodcraft, wicker work and iron-mongering.

Al-Husseini's vigorous efforts to transform the Haram into a symbol of pan-Arabic and Palestinian nationalism were intended to rally Arab support against the postwar influx of Jewish immigrants. In his campaigning, al-Husseini often accused Jews of planning to take possession of the Western Wall of Jerusalem, which belonged to the waqf of Abu Madyan as an inalienable property, and rebuild the Temple over the Al-Aqsa Mosque. He took certain statements, for example, by the Ashkenazi chief rabbi of Palestine, Abraham Isaac Kook regarding the eventual return in time of the Temple Mount back to Jewish hands, and turned them to a concrete political plot to seize control of the area. Al-Husseini's intensive work to refurbish the shrine as a cynosure for the Muslim world, and Jewish endeavours to improve their access to, and establish a ritually appropriate ambiance on the plaza by the Western Wall, led to increased conflict between the two communities, each seeing the site only from their own traditional perspective and interests. Zionist narratives pinpointed al-Husseini's works on, and publicity about, the site and threats to it, as attempts to restore his own family's waning prestige. Arab narratives read the heightened agitation of certain Jewish groups over the Wall as an attempt to revive diaspora's interest in Zionism after some years of relative decline, depression and emigration. Each attempt to make minor alterations to the status quo, still governed by Ottoman law, was bitterly protested before the British authorities by the Muslim authorities. If Muslims could cite an Ottoman regulation of 1912 specifically forbidding objects like seating to be introduced, the Jews could cite testimonies to the fact that before 1914 certain exceptions had been made to improve their access and use of the Wall. The decade witnessed several such episodes of strong friction, and the simmering tensions came to a head in late 1928, only to erupt, after a brief respite, into an explosion of violence a year later.

=== 1929 Palestine riots ===
==== Prelude ====
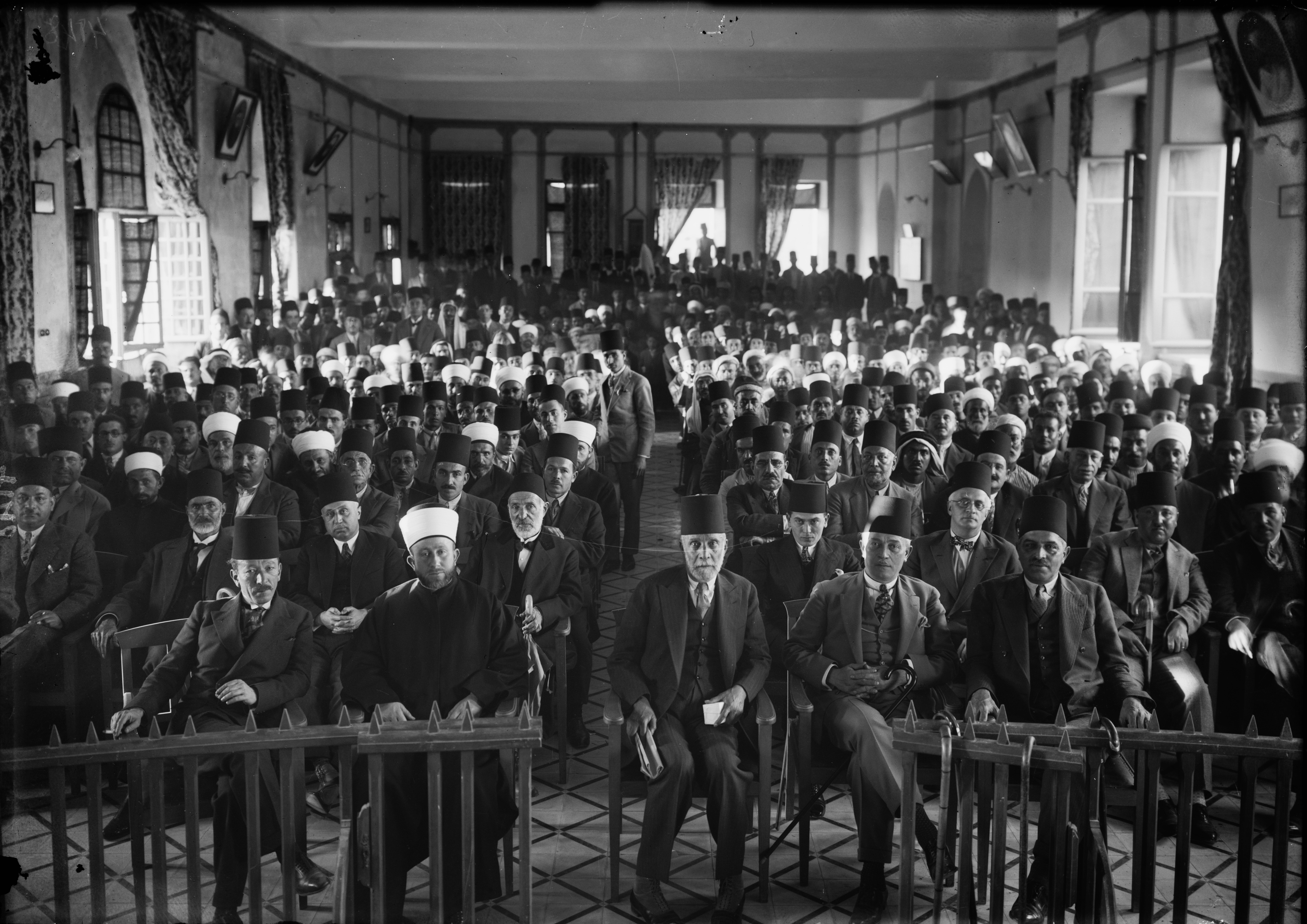
Arab protest delegations against British policy in Palestine during 1929

On 10 August 1928, a constituent assembly convened by the French in Syria was rapidly adjourned when calls were made for a reunification with Palestine. Al-Husseini and Awni Abd al-Hadi met with the Syrian nationalists and they made a joint proclamation for a unified monarchical state under a son of Ibn Sa'ud. On the 26th, the completion of the first stage of restoration work on the Haram's mosques was celebrated with great pomp, in the presence of representatives from the Muslim countries which had financed the project, the Mandatory authorities, and Abdullah, Emir of Transjordan. A month later, an article appeared in the Jewish press proposing the purchase and destruction of houses in the Moroccan quarter bordering on the wall to improve pilgrim access and thereby further the "Redemption of Israel." Soon after, on 23 September, Yom Kippur, a Jewish beadle introduced a screen to separate male and female worshippers at the Wall. Informed by residents in the neighbouring Mughrabi quarter, the waqf authority complained to Harry Luke, acting Chief Secretary to the Government of Palestine, that this virtually changed the lane into a synagogue, and violated the status quo, as had the collapsible seats in 1926. British constables, encountering a refusal, used force to remove the screen, and a jostling clash ensued between worshippers and police. (Note: See also the British account of this incident in: A Survey of Palestine (Prepared in December 1945 and January 1946 for the information of the Anglo-American Committee of Inquiry), vol. 1, chapter 2, British Mandate Government of Palestine: Jerusalem 1946, p. 23)

Zionist allegations that disproportionate force had been employed during what was a solemn occasion of prayer created an outcry throughout the diaspora. Worldwide Jewish protests remonstrated with Britain for the violence exercised at the Wall. The Jewish National Council Vaad Leumi "demanded that British administration expropriate the wall for the Jews". In reply, the Muslims organized a Defence Committee for the Protection of the Noble Buraq, and huge crowd rallies took place on the Al-Aqsa plaza in protest. Work, often noisy, was immediately undertaken on a mosque above the Jewish prayer site. Disturbances such as opening a passage for donkeys to pass through the area, angered worshippers. After intense negotiations, the Zionist organisation denied any intent to take over the whole Haram Ash-Sharif, but demanded the government expropriate and raze the Moroccan quarter. A law of 1924 allowed the British authorities to expropriate property, and fear of this in turn greatly agitated the Muslim community, though the laws of donation of the waqf explicitly disallowed any such alienation. After lengthy deliberation, a White Paper was made public on 11 December 1928 in favour of the status quo.

After the nomination of the new High Commissioner Sir John Chancellor to succeed Lord Plumer in December 1928, the question was re-examined, and in February 1929 legal opinion established that the mandatory authority was within its powers to intervene to ensure Jewish rights of access and prayer. Al-Husseini pressed him for a specific clarification of the legal status quo regarding the Wall. Chancellor mulled weakening the SMC and undermining al-Husseini's authority by making the office of mufti elective. The Nabi Musa festival of April that year passed without incident, despite al-Husseini's warnings of possible incidents. Chancellor thought his power was waning, and after conferring with London, admitted to al-Husseini on 6 May that he was impotent to act decisively in the matter. Al-Husseini replied that, unless the Mandatory authorities acted, then, very much like Christian monks protecting their sacred sites in Jerusalem, the sheikhs would have to take infringements of the status quo into their own hands, and personally remove any objects introduced by Jews to the area. Chancellor asked him to be patient, and al-Husseini offered to stop works on the Mount on condition that this gesture not be taken as a recognition of Jewish rights. A change of government in Britain in June led to a new proposal: only Muslim works in the sector near where Jews prayed should be subject to mandatory authorisation: Jews could employ ritual objects, but the introduction of seats and screens would be subject to Muslim authorisation. Chancellor authorised the Muslims to recommence their reconstructive work, while, responding to further Zionist complaints, prevailed on the SMC to stop the raucous Zikr ceremonies in the vicinity of the wall. He also asked the Zionist representatives to refrain from filling their newspapers with attacks on the government and Muslim authorities. Chancellor then departed for Europe where the Mandatory Commission was deliberating.

==== Riots ====
With Chancellor abroad, and the Zionist Commission itself, with its leader Colonel Frederick Kisch, in Zürich for the 16th Zionist Congress (attended also by Ze'ev Jabotinsky), the SMC resumed works, confidentially authorised, on the Haram only to be met with outcries from the Jewish press. The administration rapidly published the new rules on 22 July 1929, with a serious error in translation that fueled Zionist reports of a plot against Jewish rights. A protest in London led to a public declaration by a member of the Zionist Commission that Jewish rights were bigger than the status quo, a statement which encouraged in turn Arab suspicions that local agreements were again being overthrown by Jewish intrigues abroad. News that the Zurich Congress, in creating the Jewish Agency on 11 August 1929, had brought unity among Zionists and the world Jewish community, a measure that greatly increased Jewish investment in British Palestine, set off alarm bells. On 15 August, Tisha B'Av, a day memorializing the destruction of the Temple of Jerusalem, the revisionist Betar movement, despite Pinhas Rutenberg's plea on 8 August to the acting High Commissioner Harry Luke to stop such groups from participating, rallied members from Tel Aviv to join them in the religious commemoration. Kisch, before leaving, had banned Jewish demonstrations in Jerusalem's Arab quarters. The Betar youth gave the ceremony a strong nationalist tinge by singing the Hatikvah, waving the flag of Israel, and chanting the slogan "The Wall is Ours". The following day coincided with mawlid (or mawsin al-nabi), the anniversary of the birth of Islam's prophet, Muhammad. Muslim worshippers, after prayers on the esplanade of the Haram, passed through the narrow lane by the Wailing Wall and ripped up prayer books, and kotel notes (wall petitions), without harming however three Jews present. Contacted by Luke, al-Husseini undertook to do his best to maintain calm on the Haram, but could not stop demonstrators from gathering at the Wall.

On 17 August 1929 a young Jewish boy was stabbed to death by Arabs while retrieving a football, while an Arab was badly wounded in a brawl with Palestinian Jews. Strongly tied to the anti-Hashemite party, and attacked by supporters of Abdullah in Transjordan for misusing funds marked out for campaigning against France, al-Husseini asked for a visa for himself and Awni Abd al-Hadi to travel to Syria, where the leadership of the Syrian anti-French cause was being contested. Averse to his presence in Syria, the French asked him to put off the journey. Meanwhile, despite Harry Luke's lecturing journalists to avoid reporting such material, rumors circulated in both communities, of an imminent massacre of Jews by Muslims, and of an assault on the Haram ash-Sharif by Jews. On 21 August a funeral cortège, taking the form of a public demonstration for the dead Jewish boy, wound its way through the old city, with the police blocking attempts to break into the Arab quarters. On the 22nd, Luke convoked representatives of both parties to calm things down, and undersign a joint declaration. Awni Abd al-Hadi and Jamal al-Husayni were ready to recognize Jewish visiting rights at the Wall in exchange for Jewish recognition of Islamic prerogatives at the Buraq. The Jewish representative, Yitzhak Ben-Zvi, considered this beyond his brief—which was limited to an appeal for calm—and the Arabs in turn refused. They agreed to pursue their dialogue the following week.

On 23 August 1929, a Friday, two or three Arabs were murdered in the Jewish quarter of Mea Shearim. It was also a day of Muslim prayer. A large crowd, composed of many people from outlying villages, thronged into Jerusalem, many armed with sticks and knives. It is not known whether this was organized by al-Husseini or the result of spontaneous mobilisation. The sermon at Al-Aqsa was to be delivered by another preacher, but Luke prevailed on al-Husseini to leave his home and go to the mosque, where he was greeted as "the sword of the faith" and where he instructed the preacher to deliver a pacific sermon, while sending an urgent message for police reinforcements around the Haram. In response to the peaceful address, extremists harangued the crowd, accusing al-Husseini of being an infidel to the Muslim cause. The same violent accusation was launched in Jaffa against sheikh Muzaffir, an otherwise radical Islamic preacher, who gave a sermon calling for calm on the same day. An assault was launched on the Jewish quarter. Violent mob attacks on Jewish communities, fueled by wildfire hearsay about ostensible massacres of Arabs and attempts to seize the Wall, took place over the following days in Hebron, Safed and Haifa. In all, in the killings and subsequent revenge attacks, 136 Arabs and 135 Jews died, while 340 of the latter were wounded, as well as an estimated 240 Arabs.

==== Aftermath ====
Two official investigations were subsequently conducted by the British and the League of Nations's Mandatory Commission. The former, The Shaw Report, concluded that the incident on 23 August consisted of an attack by Arabs on Jews, but rejected the view that the riots had been premeditated. Al-Husseini certainly played an energetic role in Muslim demonstrations from 1928 onwards, but could not be held responsible for the August riots, even if he had "a share in the responsibility for the disturbances". He had nonetheless collaborated from the 23rd of that month in pacifying rioters and reestablishing order. The worst outbreaks occurred in areas, Hebron, Safed, Jaffa, and Haifa where his Arab political adversaries were dominant. The root cause of the violent outbreaks lay in the fear of territorial dispossession. In a Note of Reservation, Mr. Harry Snell, who had apparently been swayed by Sir Herbert Samuel's son, Edwin Samuel states that, although he was satisfied that al-Husseini was not directly responsible for the violence or had connived at it, he believed al-Husseini was aware of the nature of the anti-Zionist campaign and the danger of disturbances. He therefore attributed to the Mufti a greater share of the blame than the official report had. The Dutch Vice-Chairman of the Permanent Mandates Commission, M. Van Rees, argued that "the disturbances of August 1929, as well as the previous disturbances of a similar character, were, in brief, only a special aspect of the resistance offered everywhere in the East, with its traditional and feudal civilisation, to the invasion of a European civilisation introduced by a Western administration" but concluded that in his view "the responsibility for what had happened must lie with the religious and political leaders of the Arabs".

In London, Lord Melchett demanded his arrest for orchestrating all anti-British unrest throughout the Middle East. Consular documentation discarded the plot thesis rapidly, and identified the deeper cause as political, not religious, namely in what the Palin report had earlier identified as profound Arab discontent over Zionism. Arab memoirs on the fitna (troubles) follow a contemporary proclamation for the Defence of the Wall on 31 August 1929, which justified the riots as legitimate, but nowhere mention a coordinated plan. Izzat Darwaza, an Arab nationalist rival of al-Husseini, alone asserts, without details, that al-Husseini was responsible. Al-Husseini in his Judeophobic memoirs never claimed to have played such a role.

The High Commissioner received al-Husseini twice officially on 1 October 1929 and a week later, and the latter complained of pro-Zionist bias in an area where the Arab population still viewed Great Britain favorably. Al-Husseini argued that the weakness of the Arab position was that they lacked political representation in Europe, whereas for millennia, in his view, the Jews dominated with their genius for intrigue. He assured Chancellor of his cooperation in maintaining public order.

=== Political activities, 1930–1935 ===
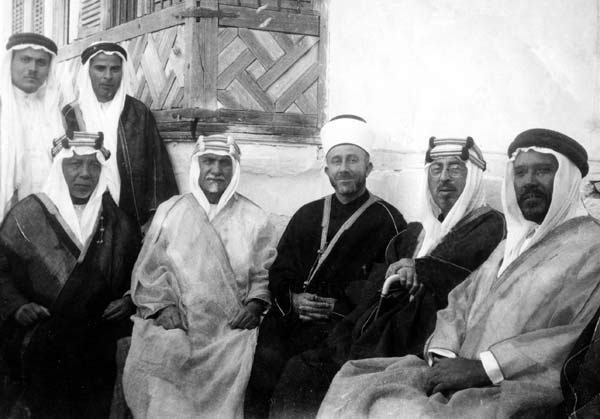
Al-Husseini (center) in a visit to Saudi Arabia in the early 1930s. To his left is Hashim al-Atassi, who later became president of Syria and to al-Husseini's right is Shakib Arslan, an Arab nationalist philosopher from Lebanon.

By 1928–1929 a coalition of a new Palestinian nationalist group began to challenge the hegemony so far exercised by al-Husseini. The group, more pragmatic, hailed from the landed gentry and from business circles, and was intent on what they considered a policy of more realistic accommodation to the Mandatory government. From this period on, a rift emerged, that was to develop into a feud between the directive elite of Palestinian Arabs.

In 1931, al-Husseini founded the World Islamic Congress, on which he was to serve as president. Versions differ as to whether or not al-Husseini supported Izz ad-Din al-Qassam when he undertook clandestine activities against the British Mandate authorities. His appointment as imam of the al-Istiqlal mosque in Haifa had been approved by al-Husseini. Lachman argues that he secretly encouraged, and perhaps financed al-Qassam at this period. Whatever their relations, the latter's independent activism, and open challenge to the British authorities appears to have led to a rupture between the two. He vigorously opposed the Qassamites' exactions against the Christian and Druze communities.

In 1933, according to Alami, al-Husseini expressed interest in Ben Gurion's proposal of a Jewish-Palestine as part of a larger Arab federation. (Note: "The grand mufti, Alami has claimed, expressed interest in the Idea of Jewish Palestine as part of a larger Arab federation." (Kotzin 2010, pp. 251–))

By 1935 al-Husseini did take control of one clandestine organization, of whose nature he had not been informed until the preceding year, which had been set up in 1931 by Musa Kazim al-Husayni's son, Abd al-Qadir al-Husayni and recruited from the Palestinian Arab Boy Scout movement, called the "Holy Struggle" (al-jihad al-muqaddas). This and another paramilitary youth organization, al-Futuwwah, paralleled the clandestine Jewish Haganah. Rumours, and occasional discovery of caches and shipments of arms, strengthened military preparations on both sides.

=== 1936–1939 Arab revolt in Palestine ===
On 19 April 1936, a wave of protest strikes and attacks against both the British authorities and Jews was unleashed in Palestine. Initially, the riots were led by Farhan al-Sa'di, a militant sheik of the northern al-Qassam group, with links to the Nashashibis. After the arrest and execution of Farhan, al-Husseini seized the initiative by negotiating an alliance with the al-Qassam faction. Apart from some foreign subsidies, including a substantial amount from Fascist Italy, he controlled waqf and orphan funds that generated annual income of about 115,000 Palestine pounds. After the start of the revolt, most of that money was used to finance the activities of his representatives throughout the country. To Italy's Consul-General in Jerusalem, Mariano de Angelis, he explained in July that his decision to get directly involved in the conflict arose from the trust he reposed in Italian dictator Benito Mussolini's backing and promises. Upon al-Husseini's initiative, the leaders of Palestinian Arab clans formed the Arab Higher Committee under his chairmanship. The Committee called for nonpayment of taxes after 15 May and for a general strike of Arab workers and businesses, demanding an end to the Jewish immigration. The British High Commissioner for Palestine, Sir Arthur Wauchope, responded by engaging in negotiations with al-Husseini and the Committee. The talks, however, soon proved fruitless. Al-Husseini issued a series of warnings, threatening the "revenge of God Almighty" unless the Jewish immigration were to stop, and the general strike began, paralyzing the government, public transportation, Arab businesses and agriculture.

As the time passed, by autumn the Arab middle class had exhausted its resources. Under these circumstances, the Mandatory government was looking for an intermediary who might help persuade the Arab Higher Committee to end the rebellion. Al-Husseini and the Committee rejected King Abdullah of Transjordan as mediator because of his dependence on the British and friendship with the Zionists, but accepted the Iraqi Foreign Minister Nuri as-Said. As Wauchope warned of an impending military campaign and simultaneously offered to dispatch a Royal Commission of Inquiry to hear the Arab complaints, the Arab Higher Committee called off the strike on 11 October 1936. When the promised Royal Commission of Inquiry arrived in Palestine in November, al-Husseini testified before it as chief witness for the Arabs.

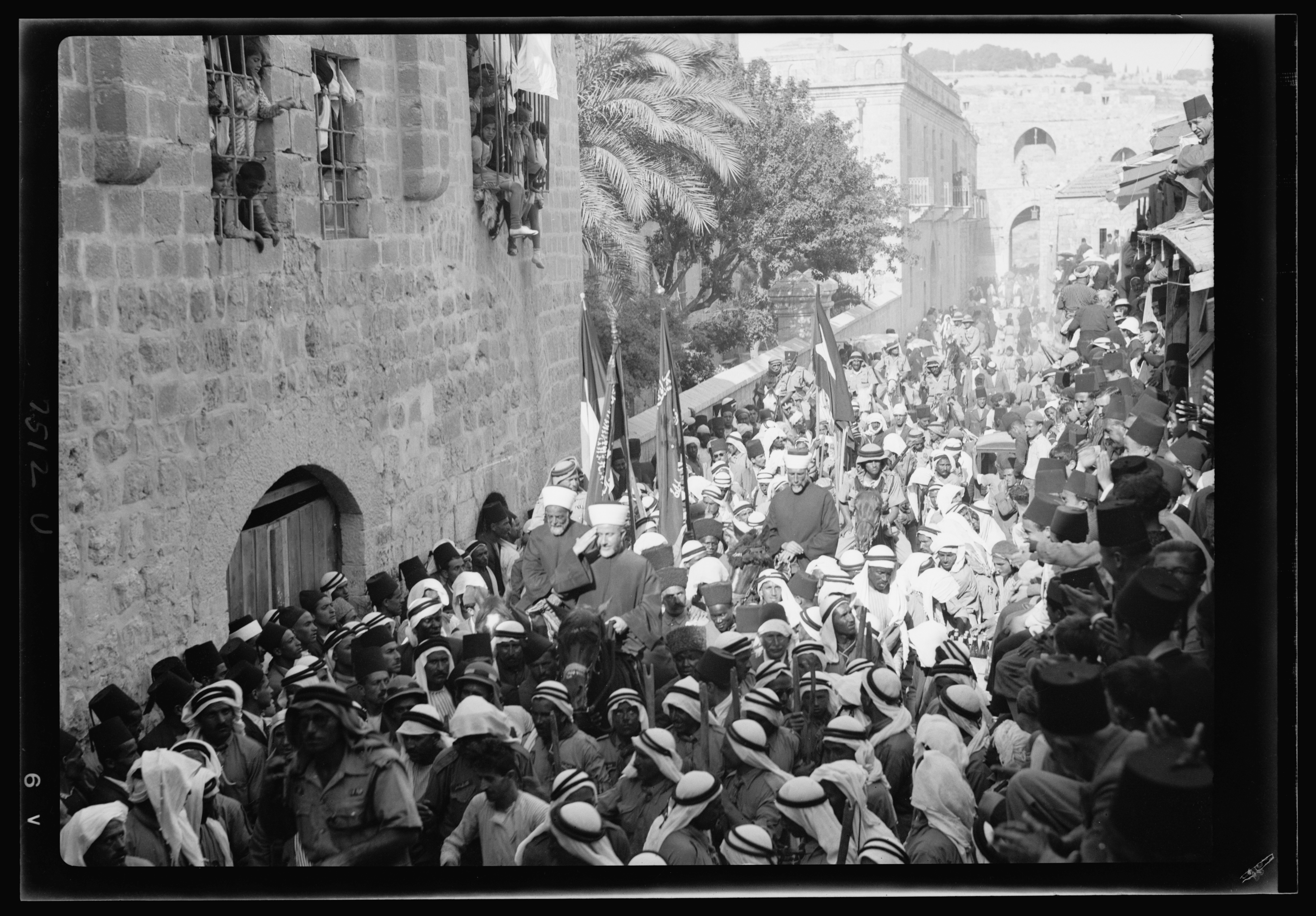
Amin al-Husseini joins the Nabi Musa celebrations, 1937

Deposition of Amin el Husseini from the Supreme Muslim Sharia Council and declaration of the Arab Higher Committee as illegal

In July 1937, British police were sent to arrest al-Husseini for his part in the Arab rebellion, but, tipped off, he managed to escape to the sanctuary of asylum in the Haram. He stayed there for three months, directing the revolt from within. Four days after the assassination of the Acting District Commissioner for that area Lewis Yelland Andrews by Galilean members of the al-Qassam group on 26 September 1937, al-Husseini was deposed from the presidency of the Muslim Supreme Council, the Arab Higher Committee was declared illegal, and warrants for the arrest of its leaders were issued, as being at least "morally responsible", though no proofs existed for their complicity. Of them only Jamal al-Husayni managed to escape to Syria: the remaining five were exiled to the Seychelles. Al-Husseini was not among the indicted but, fearing imprisonment, on 14 October 1937, after sliding under cover of darkness down a rope from the Haram's wall, he himself fled, in a Palestine Police Force car to Jaffa where he boarded a tramp steamer that conveyed him to Lebanon, disguised as a Bedouin, where he reconstituted the committee under his leadership. Though terrorism was used by both sides, Al-Husseini's tactics, his abuse of power to punish other clans, and the killing of political adversaries he considered "traitors", alienated many Palestinian Arabs. One local leader, Abu Shair, told Da'ud al-Husayni, an emissary from Damascus who bore a list of people to be assassinated during the uprising "I don't work for Husayniya ('Husayni-ism') but for wataniya (nationalism)." He remained in Lebanon for two years, under French surveillance in the Christian village of Zouk, but, in October 1939, his deteriorating relationship with the French and Syrian authorities – they had asked him to make a public declaration of support for Great Britain and France, – led him to withdraw to the Kingdom of Iraq.

The rebellion itself had lasted until March 1939, when it was finally quelled by British troops, assisted by Zionist forces, with a 10/1 advantage over Palestinians. Al-Husseini was sufficiently depressed by the outcome, and the personal loss of many friends and relatives, that he contemplated suicide, according to the French High Commissioner in Lebanon. The Revolt nonetheless forced Britain to make substantial concessions to Arab demands. Jewish immigration was to continue but under restrictions, with a quota of 75,000 places spread out over the following five years. On the expiry of this period further Jewish immigration would depend on Arab consent. Besides local unrest, another key factor in bringing about a decisive change in British policy was Nazi Germany's preparations for a European war, which would develop into a worldwide conflict. In British strategic thinking, securing the loyalty and support of the Arab world assumed an importance of some urgency. While Jewish support was unquestioned, Arab backing in a new global conflict was by no means assured. By promising to phase out Jewish immigration into Palestine, Britain hoped to win back support from wavering Arabs.

Husseini, allied to radical elements in exile, hailing from provincial Palestinian families, convinced the AHC, against moderate Palestinian families who were minded to accept it, to reject the White Paper of 1939, which had recommended an Arab-majority state and an end to building a Jewish national home. The rejection was based on its perceived failure to promise an end to immigration; the land policy it advocated was thought to provide imperfect remedies: and the promised independence appeared to depend on Jewish assent and cooperation. Husseini, who also had personal interests threatened by these arrangements, also feared that acceptance would strengthen the hand of his political opponents in the Palestine national movement, such as the Nashashibis. Schwanitz and Rubin argued that Husseini was a great influence on Hitler and that his rejectionism was, ironically, the real causal factor for the establishment of the state of Israel, a thesis Mikics, who regards Husseini as a "radical anti-semite", finds both "astonishing" and "silly", since it would logically entail the collateral thesis that the Zionist movement triggered the Holocaust.

Neve Gordon writes that al-Husseini regarded all alternative nationalist views as treasonous, opponents became traitors and collaborators, and patronizing or employing Jews of any description illegitimate. From Beirut he continued to issue directives. The price for murdering opposition leaders and peace leaders rose by July to 100 Palestine pounds: a suspected traitor 25 pounds, and a Jew 10. Notwithstanding this, ties with the Jews were reestablished by leading families such as the Nashashibis, and by the Fahoum of Nazareth. By June 1939, after the disintegration of the revolt, Husseini's policy of killing only proven turncoats changed to one of liquidating all suspects, even members of his own family, according to one intelligence report.

== Ties with the Axis Powers during World War II ==
Since 1918, Arab nationalist movements lay under the constraints imposed by the French-English imperial duopoly in the Middle East, which in turn extended to the sphere of international politics. The Arabs perceived their interests as tied up with an eventual weakening of these two powers as a precondition for establishing their national independence. For this reason, as early as June 1933, even the most Europeanized of Palestinian notables were known to look forward to a renewed outbreak of war in Europe, something that would enable them to overthrow the colonial grip on their countries and expel ("throw into the sea") the Jews in Palestine, the French in Syria, and the English throughout the Arab world. al-Husayni was only one of many such notables who greeted with optimism the emergence of a new regime in Germany in that year.

The Nazis generally regarded Arabs with contempt. Hitler himself had in 1937 spoken of them as "half-apes". However, throughout the interwar period, Arab nationalists bore Germany no ill-will (despite its earlier support for the Ottoman Empire). Like many Arab countries, Germany was perceived as a victim of the post-World War I settlement. Hitler himself often spoke of the "infamy of Versailles". Unlike France and Great Britain it had not exercised imperial designs on the Middle East, and its past policy of non-intervention was interpreted as a token of good will. While the scholarly consensus is that Husseini's motives for supporting the Axis powers and his alliance with Nazi Germany and Fascist Italy were deeply inflected by anti-Jewish and anti-Zionist ideology from the outset, some scholars, notably Renzo De Felice, deny that the relationship can be taken to reflect a putative affinity of Arab nationalism with Nazi/Fascist ideology, and that men like Husseini chose them as allies for purely strategic reasons, on the grounds that, as Husseini later wrote in his memoirs, "the enemy of your enemy is your friend". British policy was to ease Husseini "into oblivion" by ignoring him, Nuri al-Said, mediating, endeavoured to get him to side with the Allies against the Germans. The overture was considered then rebuffed: according to Philip Mattar, Husseini was reluctant to lend his voice in support of Britain "because it had destroyed Palestinian villages, executed and imprisoned Palestinian fighters, and exiled their leaders".

When Husseini eventually met with Hitler and Ribbentrop in 1941, he assured Hitler that "The Arabs were Germany's natural friends because they had the same enemies... namely the English, the Jews, and the Communists". Hitler was pleased with him, considering him "the principal actor in the Middle East" and an Aryan because of al-Hussaini's fair skin, blond hair and blue eyes.

=== Pre-war ===
It has often been stated that the Nazis inspired and financed the Arab Revolt. According to Philip Mattar, there is no reliable evidence to support such a claim. In 1933, within weeks of Hitler's rise to power in Germany, the German Consul-General in Jerusalem for Palestine, Heinrich Wolff, an open supporter of Zionism, sent a telegram to Berlin reporting al-Husseini's belief that Palestinian Muslims were enthusiastic about the new regime and looked forward to the spread of fascism throughout the region. Wolff met al-Husseini and many sheikhs again, a month later, at Nabi Musa. They expressed their approval of the anti-Jewish boycott in Germany and asked Wolff not to send any Jews to Palestine. Wolff subsequently wrote in his annual report for that year that the Arabs' political naïvety led them to fail to recognize the link between German Jewish policy and their problems in Palestine, and that their enthusiasm for Nazi Germany was devoid of any real understanding of the phenomenon. The various proposals by Palestinian Arab notables like al-Husseini were rejected consistently over the years out of concern to avoid disrupting Anglo-German relations, in line with Germany's policy of not imperiling their economic and cultural interests in the region by a change in their policy of neutrality, and respect for British interests. Hitler's Englandpolitik essentially precluded significant assistance to Arab leaders. This care for treating with respect English colonial initiatives (like the promotion of Zionist immigration) was also linked to Nazi ambitions to drive Jews out of Europe.

Italy also made the nature of its assistance to the Palestinian contingent on the outcome of its own negotiations with Britain, and cut off aid when it appeared that the British were ready to admit the failure of their pro-Zionist policy in Palestine. Al-Husseini's adversary, Ze'ev Jabotinsky had at the same time cut off Irgun ties with Italy after the passage of antisemitic racial legislation.

Though Italy did offer substantial aid, some German assistance also trickled through. After asking the new German Consul-General, Hans Döhle on 21 July 1937 for support, the Abwehr briefly made an exception to its policy and gave some limited aid. But this was aimed to exert pressure on Britain over Czechoslovakia. Promised arms shipments never eventuated. This was not the only diplomatic front on which al-Husseini was active. A month after his visit to Döhle, he wrote to the American Consul George Wadsworth (August 1937), to whom he professed his belief that America was remote from imperialist ambitions and therefore able to understand that Zionism "represented a hostile and imperialist aggression directed against an inhabited country". In a meeting with Wadsworth on 31 August, he expressed his fears that Jewish influence in the United States might persuade the country to side with Zionists. In the same period he courted the French government by expressing a willingness to assist them in the region.

=== Al-Husseini in Iraq ===
With the outbreak of the Second World War in September 1939 the Iraqi Government complied with a British request to break off diplomatic relations with Germany, interned all German nationals, and introduced emergency measures putting Iraq on a virtual war-footing. Al-Husseini in the meantime had quietly slipped out of Beirut with his family on 14 October 1939, reaching Baghdad two days later. There he was welcomed as the leading Arab nationalist of his day, and heir to King Faisal, modern Iraq's founder.

A circle of 7 officers who had opposed this government decision and the measures taken had invited him, with Nuri as-Said's agreement, to Iraq, and he was to play an influential role there in the following two years. Nuri as-Said hoped to negotiate concessions on Palestine with the British in exchange for a declaration of support for Great Britain. A quadrumvirate of four younger generals among the seven, three of whom had served with al-Husseini in World War I, were hostile to the idea of subordinating Iraqi national interests to Britain's war strategy and requirements. They responded to high public expectations for achieving independence from Britain, and deep frustration at the treatment of Palestinians by the latter. In March 1940, the nationalist Rashid Ali replaced Nuri as-Said. Ali made covert contacts with German representatives in the Middle East, though he was not yet an openly pro-Axis supporter, and al-Husseini's personal secretary Kemal Hadad acted as a liaison between the Axis powers and these officers.

As the European situation for the Allies deteriorated, Husseini advised Iraq to adhere to the letter to their treaty with Great Britain, and avoid being drawn into the war in order to conserve her energies for the liberation of Arab countries. Were Russia, Japan and Italy to side with Germany however, Iraqis should proclaim a revolt in Palestine. In July 1940 Colonel S. F. Newcombe managed to work out an agreement with Nuri al-Sa'id, who was then Foreign Minister, and the Palestinians Jamal al-Husayni and Musa al-'Alami to the effect that Palestinian Arabs would support Britain and assent to the White Paper of 1939. Iraq undertook to place half of its army under Allied command outside the country's borders. Amin al-Husseini, despite his previous rejection of the White Paper and his advice (to the Iraqis) not to use the White Paper as a starting point for negotiations, gave his support to the agreement. According to Nevo (1984) the Newcombe agreement said that Palestine would be granted independence immediately rather than after a 10-year period stipulated by the 1939 White Paper; Mattar (1984) does not mention any such provision in the Newcombe agreement. On 29 August 1940, the British however reneged on the agreement. The British backtracked out of fear over the hostile reaction the accord might stir up among the Jews of Palestine, and among American Jews, whose opinion was important were Britain to gain American support in the war. That summer, Britain dropped all attempts to deal with al-Husseini, and he threw in his lot with Germany. al-Husseini's dissatisfaction with Nuri's pro-British politics, in the meantime, was exacerbated by the latter's refusal to intervene with the British on behalf of the families, all of whom he knew, of 39 Palestinians who had been sentenced to death in secret trials for, in Husseini's view, the crime of defending their country.

Al-Husseini used his influence and ties with the Germans to promote Arab nationalism in Iraq. He was among the key promoters of the pan-Arab Al-Muthanna Club, and supported the pro-Axis coup d'état by Rashid Ali in April 1941. When the Anglo-Iraqi War broke out, during which Britain used a mobile Palestinian force of British and Jewish troops, and units from the Arab Legion al-Husseini used his influence to issue a fatwa for a holy war against Britain. The situation of Iraq's Jews rapidly deteriorated, with extortions and sometimes murders taking place. Following the Iraqi defeat and the collapse of Rashid Ali's government, the Farhud pogrom in Baghdad, led by members of the Al-Muthanna Club, which had served as a conduit for German propaganda funding, erupted in June 1941. It was the first Iraqi pogrom in a century, one fueled by violent anti-Jewish feelings stirred over the preceding decade by the ongoing conflict between Arabs and Jews in Palestine.

On 23 May 1940, Pinhas Rutenberg had suggested to a British official, Bruce Lockhart, that al-Husseini be assassinated. The idea was broadly discussed only months later. The War Office and Winston Churchill formally approved his assassination in November of that year, but the proposal was shelved after objections arose from the Foreign Office, concerned at the impact an attempt on his life might have in Iraq where his resistance to the British was widely admired. After the coup of April 1941, British called on assistance from the Irgun, after General Percival Wavell had one of their commanders, David Raziel, released from his imprisonment in Palestine. They asked him if he would undertake to kill or kidnap al-Husseini and destroy Iraq's oil refineries. Raziel agreed on condition he be allowed to kidnap al-Husseini. Raziel and other Irgun militants were flown to the RAF base at Habbaniyya where he died two days later, on 20 May 1941, when the car he was travelling in was strafed by a German plane.

When the Iraqi resistance collapsed – given its paucity, German and Italian assistance played a negligible role in the war – al-Husseini escaped from Baghdad on 30 May 1941 to Persia (together with Rashid Ali), where he was granted extraterritorial asylum first by Japan, and then by Italy. On 8 October, after the occupation of Persia by the Allies and after the new Persian government of Shah Mohammad Reza Pahlavi severed diplomatic relations with the Axis powers, al-Husseini was taken under Italian protection. In an operation organized by Italian Military Intelligence (Servizio Informazioni Militari, or SIM). Al-Husseini was not welcome in Turkey, nor given permission nor visa to enter; however, he traveled through Turkey with the help of Italian and Japanese diplomats to get to Bulgaria and eventually Italy.

=== In Nazi-occupied Europe ===
Al-Husseini arrived in Rome on 10 October 1941. He outlined his proposals before Ubaldo Alberto Mellini Ponce de León. On condition that the Axis powers "recognize in principle the unity, independence, and sovereignty, of an Arab state, including Iraq, Syria, Palestine, and Transjordan", he offered support in the war against Britain and stated his willingness to discuss the issues of "the Holy Places, Lebanon, the Suez Canal, and Aqaba". The Italian foreign ministry approved al-Husseini's proposal, recommended giving him a grant of one million lire, and referred him to Benito Mussolini, who met al-Husseini on 27 October. According to al-Husseini's account, it was an amicable meeting in which Mussolini expressed his hostility to the Jews and Zionism.

Back in the summer of 1940 and again in February 1941, al-Husseini submitted to the Nazi German Government a draft declaration of German-Arab cooperation, containing a clause

Germany and Italy recognize the right of the Arab countries to solve the question of the Jewish elements, which exist in Palestine and in the other Arab countries, as required by the national and ethnic (völkisch) interests of the Arabs, and as the Jewish question was solved in Germany and Italy.

Encouraged by his meeting with the Italian leader, al-Husseini prepared a draft declaration, affirming the Axis support for the Arabs on 3 November 1941. In three days, the declaration, slightly amended by the Italian foreign ministry, received the formal approval of Mussolini and was forwarded to the German embassy in Rome. On 6 November, al-Husseini arrived in Berlin, where he discussed the text of his declaration with Ernst von Weizsäcker and other German officials. In the final draft, which differed only marginally from al-Husseini's original proposal, the Axis powers declared their readiness to approve the elimination (Beseitigung) of the Jewish National Home in Palestine.

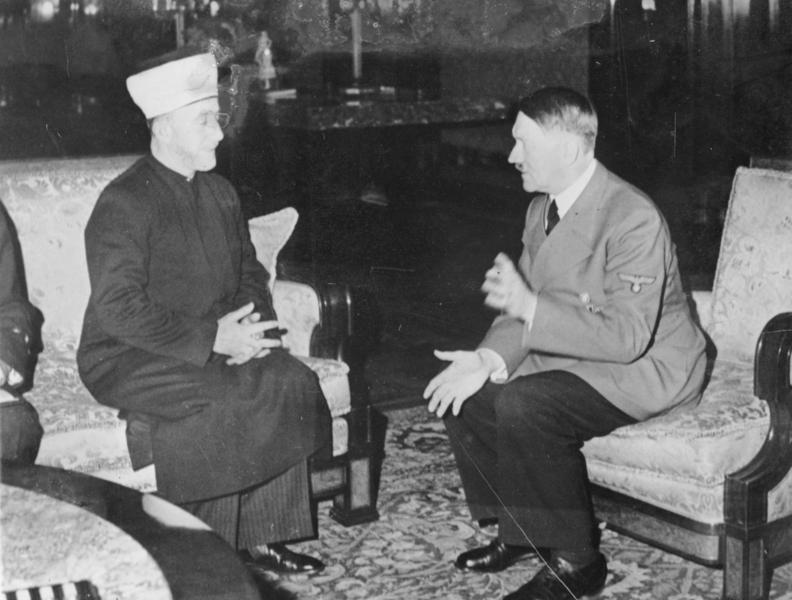
Haj Amin al-Husseini meeting with Adolf Hitler (28 November 1941).

On 20 November, al-Husseini met the German Foreign Minister Joachim von Ribbentrop and was officially received by Adolf Hitler on 28 November 1941. Hitler, recalling Husseini, remarked that he "has more than one Aryan among his ancestors and one who may be descended from the best Roman stock." He asked Adolf Hitler for a public declaration that "recognized and sympathized with the Arab struggles for independence and liberation, and that would support the elimination of a national Jewish homeland". Hitler refused to make such a public announcement, saying that it would strengthen the Gaullists against the Vichy France, but asked al-Husseini "to lock ...deep in his heart" the following points, which Christopher Browning summarizes as follows, that

Germany has resolved, step by step, to ask one European nation after the other to solve its Jewish problem, and at the proper time, direct a similar appeal to non-European nations as well. When Germany had defeated Russia and broken through the Caucasus into the Middle East, it would have no further imperial goals of its own and would support Arab liberation... But Hitler did have one goal. "Germany's objective would then be solely the destruction of the Jewish element residing in the Arab sphere under the protection of British power". (Das deutsche Ziel würde dann lediglich die Vernichtung des im arabischen Raum unter der Protektion der britischen Macht lebenden Judentums sein). In short, Jews were not simply to be driven out of the German sphere but would be hunted down and destroyed even beyond it.

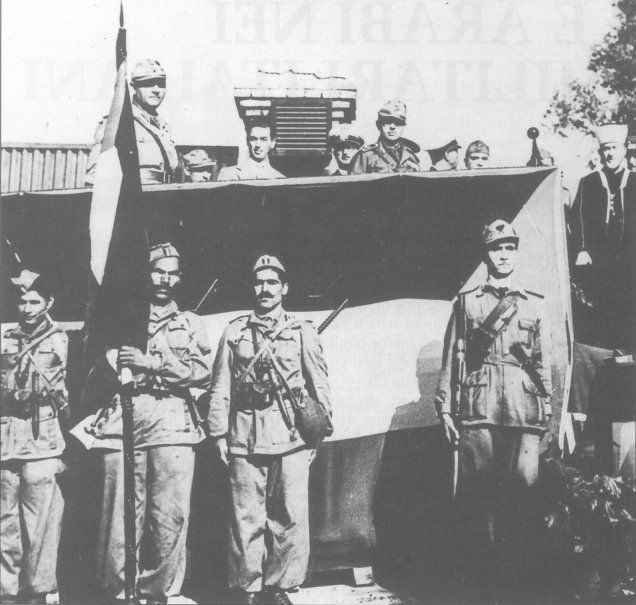
In Italy, the ex-Mufti of Jerusalem Amin al-Husseini at a dedication ceremony for an Arab unit for the Italian Army, October 1942

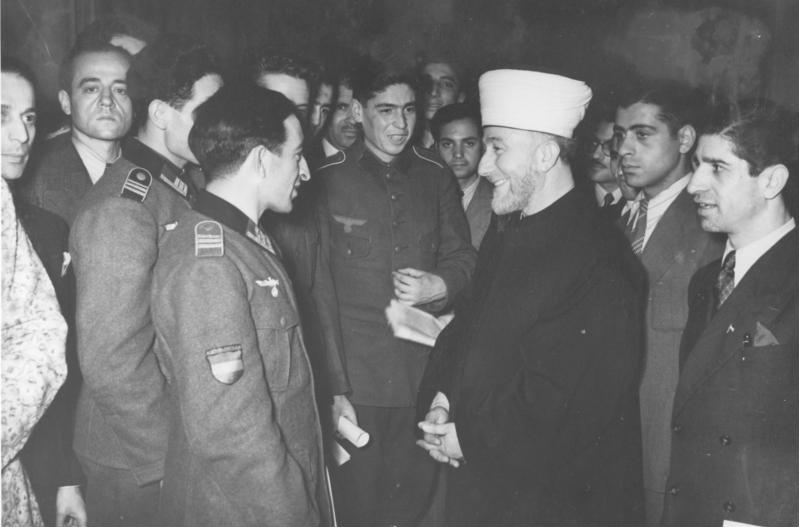
Al-Husseini meeting with Muslim volunteers, including the Azerbaijani Legion, at the opening of the Islamic Central Institute in Berlin on 18 December 1942, during the Muslim festival Eid al-Adha.

A separate record of the meeting was made by Fritz Grobba, who until recently had been the German ambassador to Iraq. His version of the crucial words reads "when the hour of Arab liberation comes, Germany has no interest there other than the destruction of the power protecting the Jews".

Al-Husseini's own account of this point, as recorded in his diary, is very similar to Grobba's. According to Amin's account, however, when Hitler expounded his view that the Jews were responsible for World War I, Marxism and its revolutions, and this was why the task of Germans was to persevere in a battle without mercy against the Jews, he replied: "We Arabs think that Zionism, not the Jews, is the cause of all of these acts of sabotage."

In December 1942, al-Husseini held a speech at the celebration of the opening of the Islamic Central Institute (Islamisches Zentralinstitut) in Berlin, of which he served as honorary chair. In the speech, he harshly criticised those he considered as aggressors against Muslims, namely "Jews, Bolsheviks and Anglo-Saxons." At the time of the opening of the Islamic Central Institute, there were an estimated 3,000 Muslims in Germany, including 400 German converts. The Islamic Central Institute gave the Muslims in Germany institutional ties to the "Third Reich".

Fritz Grobba wrote on 17 July 1942 that a member of al-Husseini's staff had visited Sachsenhausen concentration camp and that "the Jews aroused particular interest among the Arabs. ... It all made a very favorable impression on the Arabs." At the time, the Sachsenhausen camp, set up by the Nazi authorities as a "model camp" to be shown off to both domestic and foreign visitors, housed large numbers of Jews, but was only transformed into a death camp in the following year. The camp was presented during their tour as a re-educational institution, and they were shown the high quality of objects made by inmates, and happy Russian prisoners who, reformed to fight Bolshevism, were paraded, singing, in sprightly new uniforms. They left the camp very favourably impressed by its programme of educational indoctrination. In his memoirs, he recalls Himmler telling him how shocked he was to observe Jewish kapos abusing fellow Jews and that Himmler claimed he had the culprits punished.

Generally, having provided much funding for al-Husseini and his retinue, the Germans were unsatisfied with the return from their investment. He was highly secretive about his networks of contacts in the Middle East and the Abwehr complained he had given them "practically no military information of any worth." As the Abwehr grew disenchanted with him, al-Husayni gravitated by 1943 towards the SS.

=== The Holocaust ===
==== Al-Husseini and the Holocaust ====
Al-Husseini has been described by the American Jewish Congress as "Hitler's henchman" (Note: Kaufman, Ambiguous Partnership, 287, 306–7. Steven L Spiegel, The Other Arab–Israeli Conflict (Chicago: 1985), 17, 32, quoted in (Finkelstein 2003, p. 25)) and some scholars, such as Schwanitz and Rubin, have argued that Husseini made the Final Solution inevitable by shutting out the possibility of Jews escaping to Palestine.

Gilbert Achcar refers to a meeting between al-Husseini and Heinrich Himmler, in the summer of 1943, and observes:

The Mufti was well aware that the European Jews were being wiped out; he never claimed the contrary. Nor, unlike some of his present-day admirers, did he play the ignoble, perverse, and stupid game of Holocaust denial... . His amour-propre would not allow him to justify himself to the Jews... .gloating that the Jews had paid a much higher price than the Germans... he cites... : "Their losses in the Second World War represent more than thirty percent of the total number of their people ...". Statements like this, from a man who was well placed to know what the Nazis had done ... constitute a powerful argument against Holocaust deniers. Husseini reports that Reichsführer-SS Heinrich Himmler ... told him in summer 1943 that the Germans had "already exterminated more than three million" Jews: "I was astonished by this figure, as I had known nothing about the matter until then." ... Thus. in 1943, Husseini knew about the genocide... .

Al-Husseini's memoir then continues:-

Himmler asked me on the occasion: "How do you propose to settle the Jewish question in your country?" I replied: "All we want from them is that they return to their countries of origin." He (Himmler) replied: "We shall never authorize their return to Germany."

Wolfgang G. Schwanitz doubts the sincerity of his surprise since, he argues, Husseini had publicly declared that Muslims should follow the example Germans set for a "definitive solution to the Jewish problem". (Note: Schwanitz 2008, p. ? citing Abd al-Karim al-Umar (ed.), Memoirs of the Grand Mufti, Damascus, 1999, p. 126.)

Subsequently, al-Husseini declared in November 1943:

It is the duty of Muhammadans [Muslims] in general and Arabs in particular to ... drive all Jews from Arab and Muhammadan countries... . Germany is also struggling against the common foe who oppressed Arabs and Muhammadans in their different countries. It has very clearly recognized the Jews for what they are and resolved to find a definitive solution [endgültige Lösung] for the Jewish danger that will eliminate the scourge that Jews represent in the world.

At the Nuremberg trials, one of Adolf Eichmann's deputies, Dieter Wisliceny, stated that al-Husseini had actively encouraged the extermination of European Jews, and that al-Husseini had a meeting with Eichmann at his office, during which Eichmann gave him a view of the current state of the "Solution of the Jewish Question in Europe" by the Third Reich. The allegation is dismissed by most serious historians. A single affidavit by Rudolf Kastner reported that Wisliceny told him that he had overheard Husseini say he had visited Auschwitz incognito in Eichmann's company. Eichmann denied this at his trial in Jerusalem in 1961. He had been invited to Palestine in 1937 with his superior Hagen by a representative of the Haganah, Feival Polkes, Polkes supported German foreign policy in the Near East and offered to work for them in intelligence. Eichmann and Hagen spent one night in Haifa but were refused a visa to stay any longer. They met Polkes in Cairo instead. Eichmann stated that he had only been introduced to al-Husseini during an official reception, along with all other department heads, and there is no evidence, despite intensive investigations, that shows al-Husseini to have been a close collaborator of Eichmann, exercising influence over him or accompanying on visits to death camps. The Jerusalem court accepted Wisliceny's testimony about a key conversation between Eichmann and the mufti, and found as proven that al-Husseini had aimed to implement the Final Solution. Hannah Arendt, who was present at the trial, concluded in her book, Eichmann in Jerusalem: A Report on the Banality of Evil, that the evidence for an Eichmann- al-Husseini connection was based on rumour and unfounded.

Rafael Medoff concludes that "actually there is no evidence that the Mufti's presence was a factor at all; the Wisliceny hearsay is not merely uncorroborated, but conflicts with everything else that is known about the origins of the Final Solution." Bernard Lewis also called Wisliceny's testimony into doubt: "There is no independent documentary confirmation of Wisliceny's statements, and it seems unlikely that the Nazis needed any such additional encouragement from the outside." Bettina Stangneth called Wisliceny's claims "colourful stories" that "carry little weight".

==== Opposition to Jewish immigration ====
Al-Husseini opposed all immigration of Jews into Palestine, and during the war he campaigned against the transfer of Jewish refugees to Palestine. No evidence has been forthcoming to show he was opposed to transferring Jews to countries outside the Middle East. Al-Husseini's numerous letters appealing to various governmental authorities to prevent Jewish refugees from emigrating to Palestine have been republished and widely cited as documentary evidence of his participative support for the Nazi genocide. For instance, Husseini intervened on 13 May 1943, before the meeting with Himmler when he was informed of the Holocaust, with the German Foreign Office to block possible transfers of Jews from Bulgaria, Hungary and Romania to Palestine, after reports reached him that 4,000 Jewish children accompanied by 500 adults had managed to reach Palestine. He asked the Foreign Minister "to do his utmost" to block all such proposals, and this request was complied with. According to Idith Zertal, none of the documents presented at Eichmann's trial prove that it was al-Husseini's interference, in these "acts of total evil," that prevented the children's rescue. In June 1943 al-Husseini recommended to the Hungarian minister that it would be better to send Jews in Hungary to concentration camps in Poland rather than let them find asylum in Palestine. A year later, on 25 July 1944 he wrote to the Hungarian foreign minister to register his objection to the release of certificates for 900 Jewish children and 100 adults for transfer from Hungary, fearing they might end up in Palestine. He suggested that if such transfers of population were deemed necessary, then

I ask your Excellency to permit me to draw your attention to the necessity of preventing the Jews from leaving your country for Palestine, and if there are reasons which make their removal necessary, it would be indispensable and infinitely preferable to send them to other countries where they would find themselves under active control, for example, in Poland, thus avoiding danger and preventing damage.

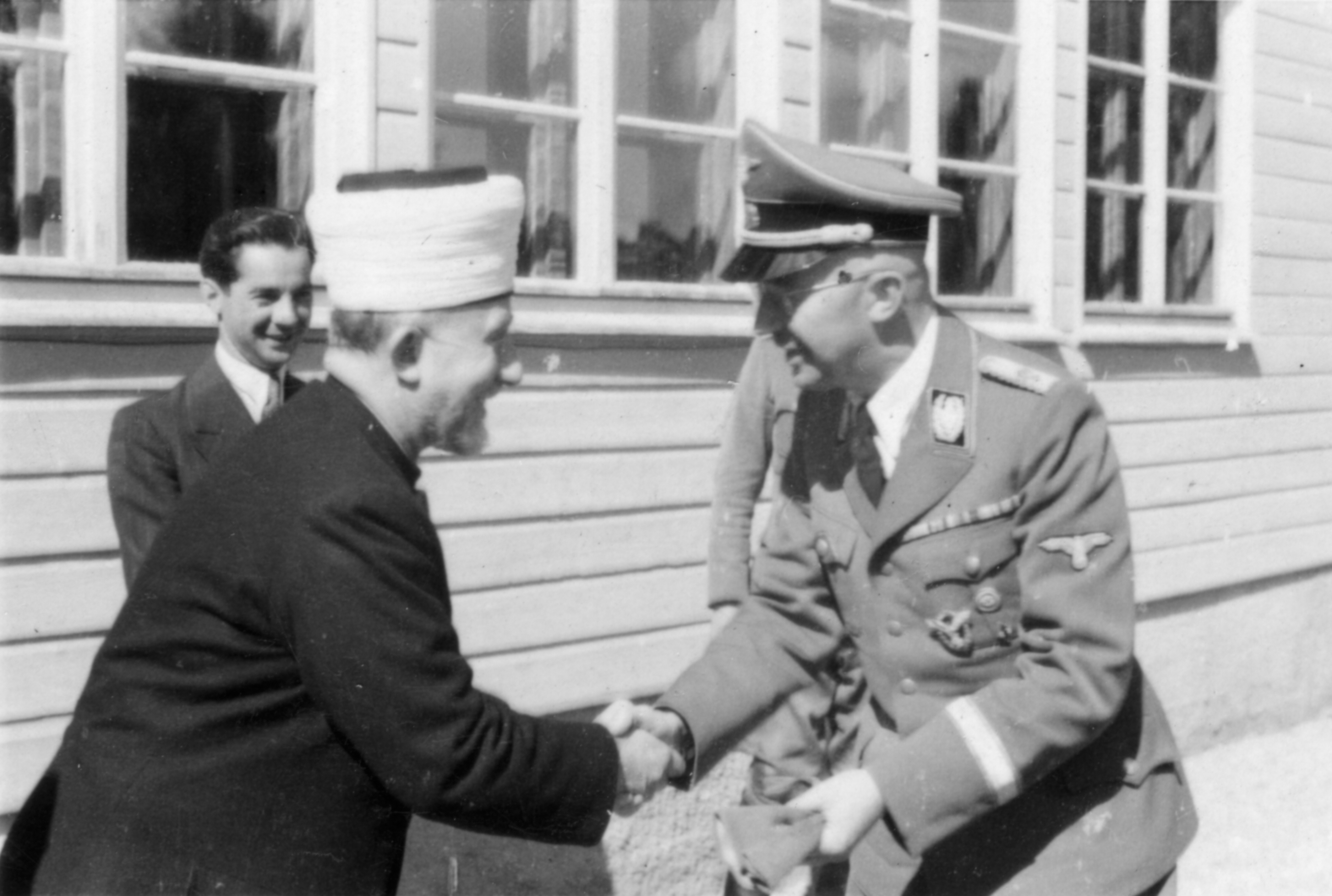
Haj Amin al-Husseini meeting with Heinrich Himmler (1943).

Achcar quotes al-Husseini's memoirs about these efforts to influence the Axis powers to prevent emigration of Eastern European Jews to Palestine:

We combatted this enterprise by writing to Ribbentrop, Himmler, and Hitler, and, thereafter, the governments of Italy, Hungary, Rumania, Bulgaria, Turkey, and other countries. We succeeded in foiling this initiative, a circumstance that led the Jews to make terrible accusations against me, in which they held me accountable for the liquidation of four hundred thousand Jews who were unable to emigrate to Palestine in this period. They added that I should be tried as a war criminal in Nuremberg.

In September 1943, intense negotiations to rescue 500 Jewish children from the Arbe concentration camp collapsed due to the objection of al-Husseini who blocked the children's departure to Turkey because they would end up in Palestine.

=== Intervention in Palestine and Operation Atlas ===
Al-Husseini collaborated with the Germans in numerous sabotage and commando operations in Iraq, Transjordan, and Palestine, and repeatedly urged the Germans to bomb Tel Aviv and Jerusalem "in order to injure Palestinian Jewry and for propaganda purposes in the Arab world", as his Nazi interlocutors put it. The proposals were rejected as unfeasible. The Italian Fascists envisaged a project to establish him as head of an intelligence centre in North Africa, and he agreed to act as commander of both regular and irregular forces in a future unit flanking Axis troops to carry out sabotage operations behind enemy lines.

Operation ATLAS was one such joint operation. A special commando unit of the Waffen SS was created, composed of three members of the Templer religious sect in Palestine, and two Palestinian Arabs recruited from al-Husseini's associates, Hasan Salama and Abdul Latif (who had edited the al-Husseini's Berlin radio addresses). It has been established that the mission, briefed by al-Husseini before departure, aimed at establishing an intelligence-gathering base in Palestine, radioing information back to Germany, and buying support among Arabs in Palestine, recruiting and arming them to foment tensions between Jews and Arabs, disrupting the Mandatory authorities and striking Jewish targets.

The plan ended in fiasco: they received a cold reception in Palestine, three of the five infiltrators were quickly rounded up, and the matériel seized. Their air-dropped cargo was found by the British, and consisted of submachine guns, dynamite, radio equipment, 5,000 Pound sterling, a duplicating machine, a German-Arabic dictionary, and a quantity of poison. Michael Bar-Zohar and Eitan Haber, have claimed that the mission included a plan to poison the Tel Aviv water supply, There is no trace of this poison plot in the standard biographies, Palestinian and Israeli, of Husseini.

=== Propaganda ===
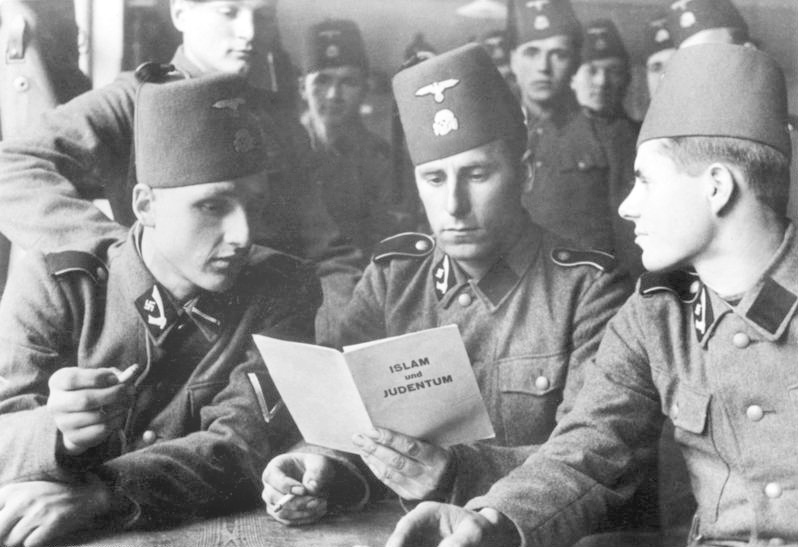
Bosniak soldiers of the SS 13 Division, reading Husseini's pamphlet Islam and Judaism

Throughout World War II, al-Husseini worked for the Axis Powers as a broadcaster in propaganda targeting Arab public opinion. He was thereby joined by other Arabs such as Fawzi al-Qawuqji and Hasan Salama. The Mufti was paid "an absolute fortune" of 50,000 marks a month (when a German field marshal was making 25,000 marks a year), the equivalent today of $12,000,000 a year. Walter Winchell called him "the Arabian Lord Haw-Haw". Only about 6,300 Arab soldiers ended up being trained by German military organisations, no more than 1,300 from Palestine, Syria and Iraq combined. In contrast, Britain managed to recruit 9,000 from Palestine alone and a quarter of a million North African troops served in the French Army of Liberation where they made up the majority of its dead and wounded.

The Mufti also wrote a pamphlet for the 13th SS Handschar division, translated as Islam i Židovstvo (Islam and Judaism) which closed with a quotation from Bukhari-Muslim by Abu Khurreira that states: "The Day of Judgement will come, when the Muslims will crush the Jews completely: And when every tree behind which a Jew hides will say: 'There is a Jew behind me, Kill him!". Some accounts have alleged that the Handschar was responsible for killing 90% of Bosnian Jews. However, Handschar units were deployed only after most of the Jews in Croatia had been deported or exterminated by the Ustaše regime. One report, however, of a Handschar patrol murdering some Jewish civilians in Zvornik in April 1944 after their real identity was revealed, is plausible.

On 1 March 1944, while speaking on Radio Berlin, al-Husseini said: "Arabs, rise as one man and fight for your sacred rights. Kill the Jews wherever you find them. This pleases God, history, and religion. This saves your honor. God is with you." This statement has been described as incitement to genocide.

=== Recruitment ===
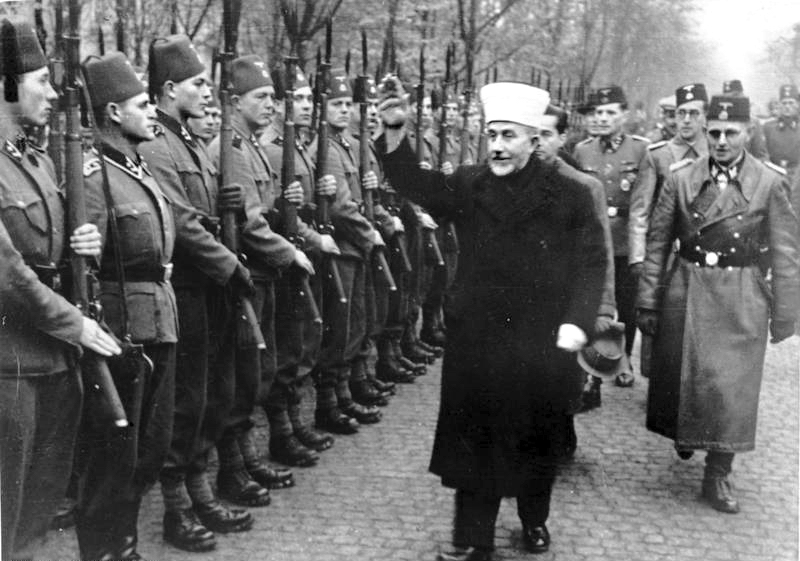
al-Husseini greeting Bosnian Waffen-SS volunteers with a Nazi salute in November 1943. At right is SS General Karl-Gustav Sauberzweig.

The idea of creating Muslim units under German command was shown interest by Heinrich Himmler, who Hoare argues viewed the Islamic world as a potential ally against the British Empire and regarded the Nazi-puppet Independent State of Croatia as a "ridiculous state". Himmler had a romantic vision of Islam as a faith "fostering fearless soldiers", and this probably played a significant role in his decision to raise three Muslim divisions under German leadership in the Balkans from Bosnian Muslims and Albanians: the 13th Handschar, the 21st Skanderbeg, and the 23rd Kama (Shepherd's dagger). Riven by interethnic conflict, the region's Jewish, Croat, Roma, Serb and Muslim communities suffered huge losses of life, Bosnian Muslims losing around 85,000 from a genocidal Chetnik ethnic cleansing operations alone. The Muslims had three options: to join the Croatian Ustaše, or the Yugoslav partisans, or to create local defense units. Following a tradition of service in the old Bosnian regiments of the former Austro-Hungarian army, a number of Bosnians chose an alliance with Germany, which promised them autonomy. Husseini, having been petitioned by the Bosnian Muslim leaders, was well informed of their plight. Dissatisfied with low enlistment, Himmler asked the mufti to intervene. Husseini negotiated, made several requests, mostly ignored by the SS, and conducted several visits to the area. His speeches and charismatic authority proved instrumental in improving enlistment notably. In one speech he declared that

Those lands suffering under the British and Bolshevist yoke impatiently await the moment when the Axis (powers) will emerge victorious. We must dedicate ourselves to unceasing struggle against Britain – that dungeon of peoples – and to the complete destruction of the British Empire. We must dedicate ourselves to unceasing struggle against Bolshevist Russia because communism is incompatible with Islam.

One SS officer reporting on impressions from the mufti's Sarajevo speech said Husseini was reserved about fighting Bolshevism, his main enemies being Jewish settlers in Palestine and the English. During a visit in July 1943 the Mufti said: "The active cooperation of the world's 400 million Muslims with their loyal friends, the German, can be of decisive influence upon the outcome of the war. You, my Bosnian Muslims, are the first Islamic division [and] serve as an example of the active collaboration....My enemy's enemy is my friend." Himmler in addressing the unit on another occasion declared "Germany [and] the Reich have been friends of Islam for the past two centuries, owing not to expediency but to friendly conviction. We have the same goals."

In an agreement signed by Husseini and Himmler on 19 May 1943, it was specified that no synthesis of Islam and Nationalism was to take place. Husseini asked that Muslim divisional operations to be restricted to the defense of the Moslem heartland of Bosnia and Herzegovina; that partisans be amnestied if they laid down their arms; that the civilian population not be subject to vexations by troops; that assistance be offered to innocents injured by operations; and that harsh measures like deportations, confiscations of goods, or executions be governed in accordance with the rule of law. The Handschar earned a repute for brutality in ridding north-eastern Bosnia of Serbs and partisans: many local Muslims, observing the violence, were driven to go over to the communist partisans. Once redeployed outside Bosnia, and as the fortunes of war turned, mass defections and desertions took place, and Volksdeutsche were drafted to replace the losses. The mufti blamed the mass desertions on German support for the Četniks. Many Bosnians in these divisions who survived the war sought asylum in Western and Arab countries, and of those settling in the Middle East, many fought in Palestine against the new state of Israel. Reacting to the formation by Great Britain of a special Jewish legion in the Allied cause, Husseini urged Germany to raise a similar Arab legion. Husseini helped organize Arab students, POWs and North African emigres in Germany into the "Arabisches Freiheitkorps", an Arab Legion in the German Army that hunted down Allied parachutists in the Balkans and fought on the Russian front.

== Activities after World War II ==
=== Arrest and flight ===
After the end of the Second World War, al-Husseini attempted to obtain asylum in Switzerland but his request was refused. He was taken into custody at Konstanz by the French occupying troops on 5 May 1945, and on 19 May, he was transferred to the Paris region and put under house arrest.

At around this time, the British head of Palestine's Criminal Investigation Division told an American military attaché that the Mufti might be the only person who could unite the Palestinian Arabs and "cool off the Zionists".

Henri Ponsot, a former ambassador of France in Syria, led the discussions with him and had a decisive influence on the events. The French authorities expected an improvement in France's status in the Arab world through his intermediaries and accorded him "special detention conditions, benefits and ever more important privileges and constantly worried about his well-being and that of his entourage". In October 1945, he was even given permission to buy a car in the name of one of his secretaries and enjoyed some freedom of movement and could also meet whoever he wanted. Al-Husseini proposed to the French two possibilities of cooperation: "either an action in Egypt, Iraq and even Transjordan to calm the anti-French excitement after the events in Syria and because of its domination in North Africa; or that he would take the initiative of provocations in [Palestine], in Egypt and in Iraq against Great Britain", so that the Arabs countries will pay more attention to British policy than to that of France. Al-Husseini was very satisfied with his situation in France and stayed there for a full year.

As early as 24 May 1945, Great Britain requested al-Husseini's extradition, arguing that he was a British citizen who had collaborated with the Nazis. Despite the fact that he was on the list of war criminals, France decided to consider him as a political prisoner and refused to comply with the British request. France refused to extradite him to Yugoslavia where the government wanted to prosecute him for the massacres of Serbs. Poussot believed al-Husseini's claims that the massacre of Serbs had been performed by General Mihailovic and not by him. Al-Husseini also explained that 200,000 Muslims and 40,000 Christians had been assassinated by the Serbs and that he had established a division of soldiers only after Bosnian Muslims had asked for his help, and that Germans and Italians had refused to provide any support to them. In the meantime, Zionist representatives—fearing that al-Husseini would escape—backed Yugoslavia's request for extradition. They claimed that al-Husseini was also responsible for massacres in Greece and pointed out his action against the Allies in Iraq in 1941; additionally they requested the support of the United States in the matter.

Members of the Jewish Agency, who loathed Husseini as a Nazi collaborator, and who were aware that states were competing to employ Nazis and Nazi collaborators, gathered war-crimes documentation on al-Husseini's role in the Holocaust. This was done in order to prevent his reinstatement to a leadership position in Palestine, in an attempt to have him arrested and prosecuted, and in the context of an intensive public relations exercise to establish a Jewish state in Mandatory Palestine. (Note: "These men were not acting as historians but as activists working in a war-torn Europe and in the wake of a catastrophe that had not yet been conceptualized as the Holocaust. ...They saw that their only chance of having Husayni arrested and prosecuted lay in making a case that he had played a critical role in the conception, planning, organization, and execution of the extermination policy." Sells 2015, pp. 734–735) The reputation of Haj Amin al-Husseini among Jews in the immediate postwar period is indicated by the observation by Raul Hilberg that when culpability for The Destruction of the European Jews was debated in 1945, al-Husseini was the only specific individual singled out to be put on trial. In June 1945, Yishuv leaders decided to eliminate al-Husseini. Although al-Husseini was located by Jewish Army members who began to plan an assassination, the mission was canceled in December by Moshe Sharett or by David Ben-Gurion, probably because they feared turning the Grand Mufti into a martyr.

A campaign of intimidation was launched to convince the mufti that at Léon Blum's request he would be handed over to the British. In September 1945, the French decided to organize his transfer to an Arab country. Egypt, Saudi Arabia or Yemen were considered and diplomatic contacts were made with their authorities and with the Arab League.

On 29 May 1947, after an influential Moroccan had organized his escape, and the French police had suspended their surveillance, al-Husseini left France on a TWA flight for Cairo using travel papers supplied by a Syrian politician who was close to the Muslim Brotherhood. It took more than 12 days for the French foreign minister to realize he had fled, and the British were not able to arrest him in Egypt, after that country granted him political asylum.

On 12 August 1947, al-Husseini wrote to French foreign minister Georges Bidault, thanking France for its hospitality and suggesting that France continue this policy to increase its prestige in the eyes of all Muslims. In September, a delegation of the Arab Higher Committee went to Paris and proposed that Arabs would adopt a neutral position on the North African question in exchange of France's support in the Palestinian question.

=== Post-war Palestinian political leadership ===
In November 1945, at the initiative of the Arab League, the "Arab Higher Committee" (AHC) was reestablished as the supreme executive body that represented the Arabs in Mandatory Palestine. This 12-member AHC included Husseini supporters and some members of political parties that opposed the Grand Mufti and his allies. The dispute between Husseini supporters and their opposition was inflamed by the return of Jamal al Husseini to the Middle East and his resumption of political activity. In March 1946 the AHC was disbanded, and then Jamal reconstituted it as an organization exclusively staffed by Husseini political allies and family members. The Arab League foreign ministers intervened in May 1946 by replacing both the AHC and the opposing "Arab Higher Front" with the "Arab Higher Executive" (AHE) to represent Palestinian Arabs. Haj Amin al Husseini was the chairman of the AHE, even though he was absent, and Jamal acted as Vice-Chairman. The Husseini faction dominated the nine-member AHE. Subsequently, al-Husseini returned to Egypt and began his practical leadership of the Palestinian Arabs while residing in Cairo. The name of the AHE was changed back to AHC in January 1947.

=== 1948 Palestine war ===
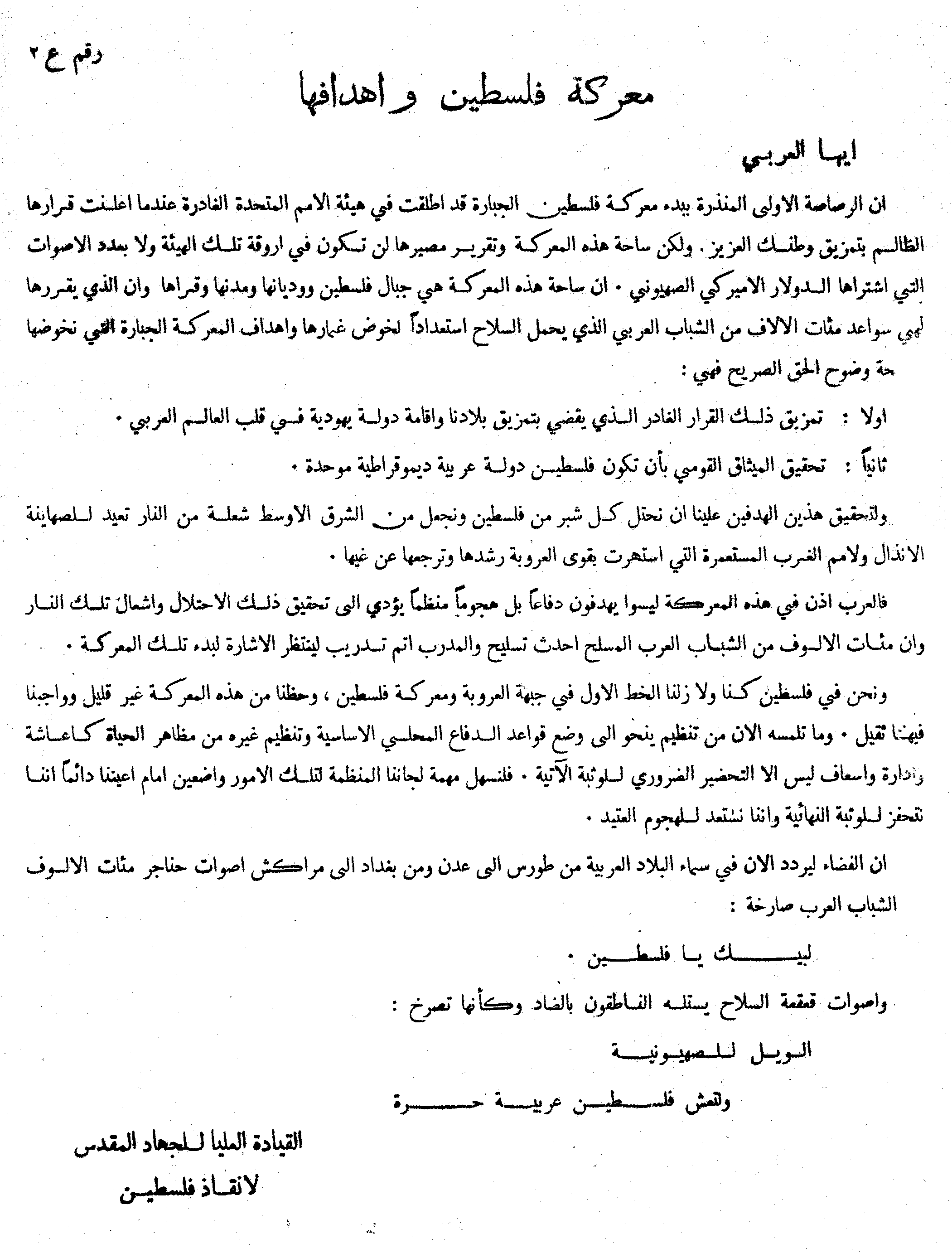
A leaflet, distributed after the U.N partition resolution, by the Mufti High Command, which calls the Arabs to attack and conquer all of Palestine, to ignite all of the Middle East and to curtail the U.N. partition resolution

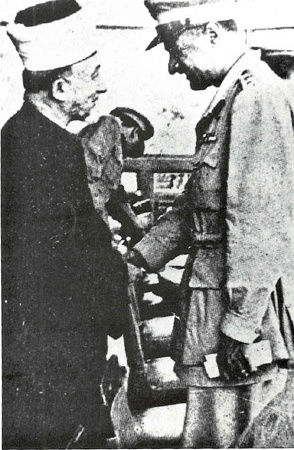
Haj Amin al-Husseini meeting with Gamal Abdel Nasser, the future Egyptian president in 1948

==== The U.N. Partition Resolution ====
When the United Nations Special Committee on Palestine delivered its recommendations for the partition of Palestine, the High Commissioner of Palestine, Alan Cunningham sent emissaries to Cairo to sound out al-Husseini, though transferring any power of state to him was unthinkable. Musa Alami surmised that the Mufti would agree to partition if he were promised that he would rule the future Arab state. According to Issa Khalaf there are no indications to substantiate this claim.

The wartime reputation of al-Husseini was employed as an argument for the establishment of a Jewish State during the deliberations at UN in 1947. The Nation Associates under Freda Kirchwey prepared a nine-page pamphlet with annexes for the United Nations entitled The Arab Higher Committee, Its Origins, Personnel and Purposes. This booklet included copies of communications between Haj Amin al-Husseini and high ranking Nazis (e.g. Heinrich Himmler, Franz von Papen, Joseph Goebbels), al-Husseini's diary account of meeting Hitler, several letters to German officials in several countries where he requested that Jews never be permitted to emigrate from Europe to a Jewish Home in Palestine, and many photographs of al-Husseini, Rashid Ali, and other Arab politicians in the company of Nazis and their Italian and Japanese allies. It claimed to demonstrate that German Nazis and Palestinian politicians (some of whom were requesting recognition at the UN in 1947 as representatives of the Palestinian Arab population) had made common cause during World War II in their opposition to the establishment of a Jewish State in Palestine. In May 1948, the Israeli government thanked Kirchwey for "having a good and honorable share of our success", at least partly as a consequence of distributing information on al-Husseini to the UN representatives.

On the eve of the United Nations' partition of Mandatory Palestine, King Abdullah, who shared with Zionists a hostility to Palestinian nationalism, reached a secret entente with Golda Meir to thwart al-Husseini and annex the part of Palestine in exchange for Jordan's dropping its opposition to the establishment of a Jewish state. The meeting, in Shlaim's words, "laid the foundations for a partition of Palestine along lines radically different from the ones eventually envisaged by the United Nations". Husseini's popularity in the Arab world had risen during his time with the Nazis, and Arab leaders rushed to greet him on his return, and the masses accorded him an enthusiastic reception, an attitude which was to change rapidly after the defeat of 1948. Elpeleg writes that "to a certain extent" Husseini was chosen as the "scapegoat" for this defeat.

==== The war ====
On 31 December 1947, Macatee, the American consul general in Jerusalem, reported that terror ruled Palestine, and that partition was the cause of this terror. According to Macatee, the Palestinian Arabs did not dare to oppose Haj Amin, but they did not rally en masse around his flag in the war against the Zionists.

From his Egyptian exile, al-Husseini used what influence he had to encourage the participation of the Egyptian military in the 1948 Arab–Israeli War. He was involved in some high level negotiations between Arab leaders—before and during the War—at a meeting held in Damascus in February 1948, to organize Palestinian Field Commands and the commanders of the Holy War Army. Hasan Salama and Abd al-Qadir al-Husayni (Amin al-Husseini's nephew), were allocated the Lydda district and Jerusalem respectively. This decision paved the way for undermining the Mufti's position among the Arab States. On 9 February 1948, four days after the Damascus meeting, he suffered a severe setback at the Arab League's Cairo session, when his demands for more Palestinian self-determination in areas evacuated by the British, and for financial loans were rejected. His demands included the appointment of a Palestinian Arab representative to the League's General Staff, the formation of a Palestinian Provisional Government, the transfer of authority to local National Committees in areas evacuated by the British, and both a loan for Palestinian administration and an appropriation of large sums to the Arab Higher Executive for Palestinian Arabs entitled to war damages.

The Arab League blocked recruitment to al-Husseini's forces, and they collapsed following the death of one of his most charismatic commanders, Abd al-Qadir al-Husayni, on 8 April 1948.

Anwar Nusseibeh, a supporter of al-Husseini, said he refused to issue arms to anyone except his loyal supporters, and only recruited loyal supporters for the forces of the Holy War Army. This partially accounts for the absence of an organized Arab force and for the insufficient amount of arms, which plagued the Arab defenders of Jerusalem.

==== Establishment of All-Palestine Government ====
Following rumors that King Abdullah I of Transjordan was reopening the bilateral negotiations with Israel that he had previously conducted clandestinely with the Jewish Agency, the Arab League—led by Egypt—decided to set up the All-Palestine Government in Gaza on 8 September 1948, under the nominal leadership of al-Husseini. Avi Shlaim writes:

The decision to form the Government of All-Palestine in Gaza, and the feeble attempt to create armed forces under its control, furnished the members of the Arab League with the means of divesting themselves of direct responsibility for the prosecution of the war and of withdrawing their armies from Palestine with some protection against popular outcry. Whatever the long-term future of the Arab government of Palestine, its immediate purpose, as conceived by its Egyptian sponsors, was to provide a focal point of opposition to Abdullah and serve as an instrument for frustrating his ambition to federate the Arab regions with Transjordan.

The All-Palestine Government was declared in Gaza on 22 September 1948, in a way as a countermeasure against Jordan. According to Moshe Ma'oz this was "a mere tool to justify Cairo's occupation of the Gaza Strip". Pre-conference by the Arab League obtained an agreement to have Ahmad Hilmi Pasha preside over the government, while giving al-Husseini a nominal role, devoid of responsibilities. A Palestinian National Council was convened in Gaza on 30 September, under the chairmanship of Amin al-Husseini. On 30 September, al-Husseini was elected unanimously as president, but had no authority outside the areas controlled by Egypt. The council passed a series of resolutions culminating on 1 October 1948 with a declaration of independence over the whole of Palestine, with Jerusalem as its capital.

The All-Palestine Government was hence born under the nominal leadership of Amin al-Husseini, the Mufti of Jerusalem, named as President. Ahmed Hilmi Abd al-Baqi was named Prime Minister. Hilmi's cabinet consisted largely of relatives and followers of Amin al-Husseini, but also included representatives of other factions of the Palestinian ruling class. Jamal al-Husayni became foreign minister, Raja al-Husayni became defense minister, Michael Abcarius was finance minister, and Anwar Nusseibeh was secretary of the cabinet. Twelve ministers in all, living in different Arab countries, headed for Gaza to take up their new positions. The decision to set up the All-Palestine Government made the Arab Higher Committee irrelevant.

Jordan's Abdullah retaliated on 2 October 1948 by organizing a Palestinian congress, which countermanded the decision taken in Gaza. Abdullah regarded the attempt to revive al-Husseini's Holy War Army as a challenge to his authority and on 3 October, his minister of defense ordered all armed bodies operating in the areas controlled by the Arab Legion to be disbanded. Glubb Pasha carried out the order ruthlessly and efficiently. Nonetheless, Egypt, which manipulated its formation, recognized the All-Palestine Government on 12 October, followed by Syria and Lebanon on 13 October, Saudi Arabia the 14th and Yemen on the 16th. Iraq's decision to the same was made formally on the 12th, but was not made public. Both Great Britain and the US backed Jordan, the US saying that al-Husseini's role in World War II could be neither forgotten nor pardoned. The sum effect was that:

The leadership of al-Hajj Amin al-Husayni and the Arab Higher Committee, which had dominated the Palestinian political scene since the 1920s, was devastated by the disaster of 1948 and discredited by its failure to prevent it.

The nakba narratives, according to Hillel Cohen, tend to ignore the open resistance to al-Husseini by many influential Palestinians. A member of the Darwish family—on expressing dissent with Husseini's war objective in favour of negotiation—was told by al-Husseini: idha takalam al-seif, uskut ya kalam – "when the sword talks, there is no place for talking". Many recalled his policy of assassinating mukhtars in the Revolt of 1936–39 and viewed al-Husseini and his kind as "an assembly of traitors". The opposition of a relevant percentage of the Palestinian society to al-Husseini goes back to an earlier period and was also connected to the British way of dealing with the local majority: "The present administration of Palestine", lamented for example the representatives of the Palestine Arab Delegation in a letter to British public opinion in 1930, "is appointed by His Majesty's Government and governs the country through an autocratic system in which the population has no say".

=== Exile from Palestine ===
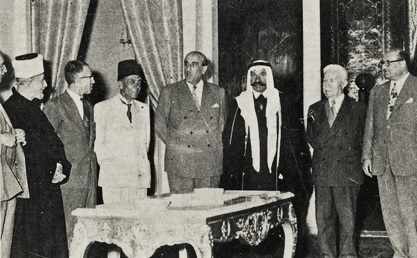
Syrian and Palestinian leaders meeting Syrian President Shukri al-Quwatli at the presidential palace, 1955. From right to left: Sabri al-Asali, Fares al-Khoury, Sultan Pasha al-Atrash, Quwatli, Mohamed Ali Eltaher, Nazim al-Qudsi, Amin al-Husayni and Muin al-Madi.

Although al-Husseini had been removed from the Supreme Muslim Council and other administrative roles by the British government in 1937, they did not remove him from the post of mufti of Jerusalem. They later explained this as due to the lack of legal procedure or precedent. However, on 20 December 1948, King Abdullah announced his replacement as mufti by his long-term rival Husam Al-din Jarallah.

The king was assassinated on 20 July 1951, on the eve of projected secret talks with Israel, by a militant, Mustafa Ashu, of the jihad al-muqaddas, while entering the Haram ash-Sharif to pray. There is no evidence al-Husseini was involved, though Musa al-Husayni was among the six indicted and executed after a disputed verdict. Abdullah was succeeded by King Talal—who refused to allow al-Husseini entry into Jerusalem. Abdullah's grandson, Hussein, who had been present at the murder, eventually lifted the ban in 1967, receiving al-Husseini as an honoured guest in his Jerusalem royal residence after uprooting the PLO from Jordan.

The Palestinian Government was entirely relocated to Cairo in late October 1948 and became a government-in-exile, gradually losing any importance. Having a part in the All-Palestine Government, al-Husseini also remained in exile at Heliopolis in Egypt throughout much of the 1950s. As before 1948, when the Yishuv believed the ex-Mufti's hand could be detected "behind every anti-Jewish pogrom, murder, and act of sabotage", Israel persisted in asserting that al-Husseini was behind many border raids from Jordanian and Egyptian-held territory, and Egypt expressed a readiness to deport him if evidence were forthcoming to substantiate the charges. The All-Palestine Government was eventually dissolved in 1959 by Nasser himself, who envisaged a United Arab Republic embracing Syria, Egypt and Palestine. That year he moved to Lebanon. He refused requests to lend his support to the emergent PLO after the Six-Day War of 1967, was opposed to the creation of a Palestinian state on the West Bank after 1967, and his closest collaborator, Emil Ghuri, continued to work for the Jordanian monarchy even after the Jordanian Civil War there in 1970.

Al-Husseini died in Beirut on 4 July 1974. He had wished to be buried on the Haram ash-Sharif in Jerusalem. However, Israel had captured East Jerusalem during the 1967 Six-Day War. The Supreme Muslim Council asked the Israeli government permission to bury him there but permission was refused. Three days later, al-Husseini was buried in Beirut. Within two years, the Christian Lebanese Phalange sacked his villa, and stole his files and archives. His granddaughter married Ali Hassan Salameh, the founder of PLO's Black September, who was later killed by Mossad for his involvement in the Munich massacre. According to Zvi Elpeleg, almost all trace of his memory thereafter vanished from Palestinian awareness, and Palestinians have raised no monument to his memory, or written books commemorating his deeds.

== Amin al-Husseini and antisemitism ==
The earlier biographical works on Husseini were characterized by extreme partisanship, with supporters among his Arab contemporaries showcasing his role as the central figure in an Arab revolt that was thwarted by British and Zionist conspiracies, and Zionist histories vilified him as a Muslim fanatic chiefly responsible for the disasters that befell Palestinians in 1948. Al-Husseini's first biographer, Moshe Pearlman, described him as virulently antisemitic, as did, a decade and a half later, Joseph Schechtman. Both have been accused by Philip Mattar of relying on press reports and lacking sufficient background understanding.

There is no doubt Husseini became robustly antisemitic and convinced himself, using arguments based on Biblical, Talmudic, and Quranic passages, that Jews were enemies of God, engaged in a global conspiracy, and practicing the ritual use of Christian blood. More recent biographers such as Philip Mattar and Elpeleg, writing in the late 1980s and early 1990s, began to emphasize his nationalism. Peter Wien judges that his behaviour in World War II deserved the image among Zionists of him as an "arch villain", but adds that Israeli and Zionist leaders have long since used this to denigrate the Palestinian resistance against the Israeli occupation as inspired by Nazism from the beginning and thus fundamentally antisemitic.

Scholarly opinion is divided on the issue, with many scholars viewing him as a staunch antisemite while some deny the appropriateness of the term, or argue that he became antisemitic. Robert Kiely sees Husseini as moving "incrementally toward anti-Semitism as he opposed Jewish ambitions in the region." Historian Zvi Elpeleg, who formerly governed both the West Bank and the Gaza Strip, while rehabilitating him from other charges, concludes his chapter concerning al-Husseini's involvement in the extermination of the Jews as follows

[i]n any case, there is no doubt that Haj Amin's hatred was not limited to Zionism, but extended to Jews as such. His frequent, close contacts with leaders of the Nazi regime cannot have left Haj Amin any doubt as to the fate which awaited Jews whose emigration was prevented by his efforts. His many comments show that he was not only delighted that Jews were prevented from emigrating to Palestine, but was very pleased by the Nazis' Final Solution.

Walter Laqueur, Benny Morris, Klaus-Michael Mallmann and Martin Cüppers, share the view that al-Husseini was biased against Jews, not just against Zionists. Morris, for instance, notes that al-Husseini saw the Holocaust as German revenge for a putative Jewish sabotaging of their war effort in World War I, and has said, "Haj Amin al-Husseini was an antisemite. This is clear from his writings. I am not saying he was just an anti-Zionist, he hated the Jews, 'Jews were evil'".

In a study dedicated to the role and use of the Holocaust in Israeli nationalist discourse, Zertal, reexamining al-Husseini's antisemitism, states that "in more correct proportions, [he should be pictured] as a fanatic nationalist-religious Palestinian leader".

There is no consensual verdict among historians concerning the degree to which Husseini might have been involved in or exposed to knowledge of the Holocaust. Wolfgang G. Schwanitz does remark that in his memoirs, Husseini recalled Himmler telling him how during the deportation of Dutch Jews, only Jews accepted the offer of payment in lieu of information on those trying to escape being caught by the Nazis. He also recorded that Himmler told him how shocked he was to observe Jewish kapos abusing fellow Jews and that Himmler claimed he had the culprits punished. In this way, it has been argued, he imitated the Nazis who were destroying them, by implicitly portraying the Jews as morally inferior. Husseini also states in his memoirs, that he had visited Alfred Rosenberg's Institute for Study of Judaism which had failed to find any way to civilise the Jewish people.

== Evaluations of Husseini's historical significance ==
Edward Said has described al-Husseini as "Palestine's national leader", who, as part of the Arab Higher Committee, "represented the Palestinian Arab national consensus, had the backing of the Palestinian political parties that functioned in Palestine, and was recognized in some form by Arab governments as the voice of the Palestinian people".

Philip Mattar states the overriding cause behind the dispossession of Palestinians lay in the Balfour Declaration, British policies and the combined military superiority of Yishuv forces and the Mandatory army. Husseini's initial moderation and then failure to compromise was a contributory factor, but not decisive. Zvi Elpeleg on the other hand compares him to Chaim Weizmann, David Ben-Gurion, and even to Theodor Herzl.

Robert Fisk, discussing the difficulties of describing al-Husseini's life and its motivations, summarized the problem in the following way:

(M)erely to discuss his life is to be caught up in the Arab–Israeli propaganda war. To make an impartial assessment of the man's career—or, for that matter, an unbiased history of the Arab–Israeli dispute—is like trying to ride two bicycles at the same time.

Peter Novick has argued that the post-war historiographical depiction of al-Husseini reflected complex geopolitical interests that distorted the record.

The claims of Palestinian complicity in the murder of the European Jews were to some extent a defensive strategy, a preemptive response to the Palestinian complaint that if Israel was recompensed for the Holocaust, it was unjust that Palestinian Muslims should pick up the bill for the crimes of European Christians. The assertion that Palestinians were complicit in the Holocaust was mostly based on the case of the Mufti of Jerusalem, a pre-World War II Palestinian nationalist leader who, to escape imprisonment by the British, sought refuge during the war in Germany. The Mufti was in many ways a disreputable character, but post-war claims that he played any significant part in the Holocaust have never been sustained. This did not prevent the editors of the four-volume Encyclopedia of the Holocaust from giving him a starring role. The article on the Mufti is more than twice as long as the articles on Goebbels and Göring, longer than the articles on Himmler and Heydrich combined, longer than the article on Eichmann—of all the biographical articles, it is exceeded in length, but only slightly, by the entry for Hitler.

In October 2015, Israeli Prime Minister Benjamin Netanyahu claimed that Hitler at the time was not thinking of exterminating the Jews, but only of expelling them, and that it was al-Husseini who inspired Hitler to embark on a programme of genocide to prevent them from coming to Palestine. Netanyahu's remarks were broadly criticized, and dismissed by Holocaust scholars from Israel and Germany. Christopher Browning called the claim a "blatantly mendacious attempt to exploit the Holocaust politically", "shameful and indecent" as well as fraudulent, aimed at stigmatizing and delegitimizing "any sympathy or concern for Palestinian rights and statehood". The official German transcript of the meeting with Hitler contains no support for Netanyahu's assertion.

In 1947, Simon Wiesenthal alleged that Eichmann had accompanied Husseini on an inspection tour of both Auschwitz and Majdanek, and that al-Husseini had praised the hardest workers at the crematoria. His claim was unsourced. The charge was recycled with added colour by Quentin Reynolds, unfounded on any evidence, at the time of the trial of Adolf Eichmann. Various sources have repeatedly alleged that he visited other concentration camps, and also the death camps of Auschwitz, Majdanek, Treblinka and Mauthausen, but according to Höpp there is little conclusive documentary evidence to substantiate these other visits.

Gilbert Achcar sums up al-Husseini's significance:

One must note in passing that Amin al-Husseini's memoirs are an antidote against Holocaust denial: He knew that the genocide took place and boasted of having been perfectly aware of it from 1943 on. I believe he is an architect of the Nakba (the defeat of 1948 and the departure of hundreds of thousands of Palestinians who had been driven out of their lands) in the sense that he bears a share of responsibility for what has happened to the Palestinian people.

Dani Dayan, who became chairman of Yad Vashem in 2021, told Haaretz that he resisted "wild attacks" in refusing to display the photograph of al-Husseini meeting Hitler. He said "Those who want me to put it up aren't really interested in the Mufti's part in the Holocaust, which was limited anyway, but seek to harm the image of the Palestinians today. The Mufti was an antisemite. But even if I abhor him, I won't turn Yad Vashem into a tool serving ends not directly related to the study and memorialization of the Holocaust. Hasbara, to use a term, is an utterly irrelevant consideration that shall not enter our gates."

== Works ==
- The Causes of the Palestine Catastrophe (1948 in Arabic). Asbab Karithat Filastin أسباب كارثة فلسطين
- The Lie of the Palestinians' Sale of their Land (1954 in Arabic, a letter of response published from Egypt). Kidhbat Bay‘ al-Filastiniyin li-'Ardihim (كذبة بيع الفلسطينيين لأرضهم)
- Facts about the Palestinian Matter (1954 in Arabic, Cairo). Haqaiq 'an Qadiyat Filastin (حقائق عن قضية فلسطين)
- The Memoirs of Amin al-Husseini, covering the period 1937 to 1948. (First published in 1975 in Arabic, republished in Syria as a whole book in 1999. Originally Published progressively as monthly articles in the Palestine Magazine between 1967 and 1975 over 75 episodes)

== See also ==
- Palestinian nationalism
- Palestinian political violence
- Army of Shadows: Palestinian Collaboration with Zionism, 1917–1948
- Relations between Nazi Germany and the Arab world
- Collaboration with the Axis Powers during World War II
- Alimjan Idris (Muslim figure compared to Amin al-Husseini due to his affiliation with Nazi Germany)

== Sources ==
- Aboul-Enein, Youssef H.; Aboul-Enein, Basil H. (2013). The Secret War for the Middle East: The Influence of Axis and Allied Intelligence Operations During World War II. Naval Institute Press. ISBN 978-1-612-51309-6.
- Achcar, Gilbert (2010b). The Arabs and the Holocaust: The Arab-Israeli War of Narratives. Henry Holt and Company. ISBN 978-1-429-93820-4.
- Achcar, Gilbert (2010c). The Arabs and the Holocaust: The Arab-Israeli War of Narratives. London: Actes Sud. p. 111. ISBN 978-0-86356-835-0. "he never became a doctrinaire adherent of his teacher Rashid Rida's fundamentalist Pan-Islamism, even if he was later elevated to the rank of a religious dignitary. Until Rida's death, Husseini accepted his counsel on doctrinal questions...When political interests required that he violate Hanbali-like orthodoxy, at the risk of offending the Wahhabis, Husseini did not hesitate."
- Achcar, Gilbert (14 May 2010a). "Blame the Grand Mufti". Le Monde diplomatique.
- Achcar, Gilbert; Ayad, Christophe (27 March 2010). "Sait-on qu' un Palestinien a créé un musée de l'Holocauste ?". Libération (in French).
- Adams, Jefferson (2009). Historical Dictionary of German Intelligence. Historical Dictionaries of Intelligence and Counter-Intelligence. Scarecrow Press. ISBN 978-0-810-86320-0.
- Aderet, Ofer (27 January 2022). "'We are the gatekeepers of historical truth. We'll fight for it even when it is inconsistent with Israel's interest'". Haaretz.
- Ahren, Raphael (22 October 2015). "In Netanyahu's mufti-Holocaust allegation, echoes of his father's maverick approach to history". The Times of Israel.
- al-Husayni, Haj Amin (1999). al-Umar, Abd al-Karim (ed.). Memoirs of the Grand Mufti. Damascus.
- Arendt, Hannah (1963). Eichmann in Jerusalem: A Report on the Banality of Evil. New York: Viking Press. ISBN 978-0-253-21637-3.
- Bar-Zohar, Michael; Haber, Eitan (2002) [First published 1983]. The Quest for the Red Prince. The Lyons Press. ISBN 978-1-58574-739-9.
- Beaumont, Peter (21 October 2015). "Anger at Netanyahu claim Palestinian grand mufti inspired Holocaust". The Guardian.
- Ben-Ze'ev, Efrat (2011). Remembering Palestine in 1948: Beyond National Narratives. Cambridge University Press. ISBN 978-0-521-19447-1.
- Benvenisti, Meron (1996). City of Stone: The Hidden History of Jerusalem. University of California Press. ISBN 978-0-520-20768-4.
- Biddiscombe, Perry (July 2018). "The Mufti's Men: Haj Amin al-Husayni and SS Parachute Expeditions to Palestine and Iraq, 1944–1945". Journal of Military History. 82 (3): 783–815 – via GWonline: Bibliography, Filmography and Webography on Gender and War since 1600.
- Black, Edwin (2004). Banking on Baghdad. New York: Wiley and Sons. p. 293. ISBN 978-0-471-67186-2 – via Internet Archive.
- Black, Edwin (2010). The Farhud: Roots of The Arab-Nazi Alliance in the Holocaust. New York: Dialog Press. ISBN 978-0-914-15314-6.
- Blamires, Cyprian, ed. (2006). World Fascism: A Historical Encyclopedia. Vol. 1. ABC-CLIO. p. 497. ISBN 978-1-57607-940-9.
- Breitman, Richard; Goda, Norman J. W. (2012) [First published 2011]. Hitler's Shadow: Nazi War Criminals, U.S. Intelligence, and the Cold War (PDF). National Archives and Records Administration. ISBN 978-1-300-34735-4.
- Browning, Christopher (22 October 2015). "Bibi's self-serving, Palestinian-blaming version of Nazi history is just plain wrong". Foreign Policy.
- Browning, Christopher R. (2007). The Origins of the Final Solution: The Evolution of Nazi Jewish Policy, September 1939 – March 1942. University of Nebraska Press. ISBN 978-0-8032-5979-9.
- Brynen, Rex (1990). Sanctuary and Survival: The PLO in Lebanon. Boulder, Colorado: Westview Press. ISBN 978-0-8133-7919-7.
- Budeiri, Musa K. (Winter 2001). "A Chronicle of a Defeat Foretold: The Battle for Jerusalem in the Memoirs of Anwar Nusseibeh". Jerusalem Quarterly (11–12). Institute for Palestine Studies: 40–51. doi:10.70190/jq.I12.p40.
- Carpi, Daniel (1977). Gutman, Yisrael; Zuroff, Ephraim (eds.). The Rescue of Jews in the Italian Zone of Occupied Croatia (PDF). Second Yad Vashem International Historical Conference, April 1974. Jerusalem: Yad Vashem.
- Carpi, Daniel (1983). "The Mufti of Jerusalem: Amin el-Husseini, and his diplomatic activity during World War II, October 1941 – July 1943". Studies in Zionism. VII: 101–131. doi:10.1080/13531048308575839.
- Cesarani, David (2007) [First published 2006]. Becoming Eichmann: Rethinking the Life, Crimes, and Trial of a "Desk Murderer". Da Capo Press. ISBN 978-0-306-81539-3.
- Cohen, Hillel (2008). Army of Shadows, Palestinian Collaboration with Zionism, 1917-1948. University of California Press. ISBN 978-0-520-25989-8.
- Cohen, Michael J. (1989). The Origins and Evolution of the Arab-Zionist Conflict. University of California Press. ISBN 978-0-520-06598-7.
- Davidson, Lawrence (2001). America's Palestine: Popular and Official Perceptions from Balfour to Israeli Statehood. University of Florida Press. ISBN 978-0-8130-2421-9.
- Davis, Erik (2005). Memories of State: Politics, History, and Collective Identity in Modern Iraq. University of California Press. ISBN 978-0-520-23546-5.
- De Felice, Renzo (1990). Mussolini l'alleato: 1. L'Italia in guerra 1940-1945 (in Italian). Vol. 1. Torino: Einaudi. ISBN 978-88-06-59306-3.
- Elpeleg, Z (12 November 2012). Himelstein, Shmuel (ed.). The Grand Mufti: Haj Amin al-Hussaini, Founder of the Palestinian National Movement. Translated by David Harvey. Routledge. pp. 60–. ISBN 978-1-136-29273-6.
- Elpeleg, Zvi (2007) [First published 1993]. Himmelstein, Shmuel (ed.). The Grand Mufti: Haj Amin Al-Hussaini, Founder of the Palestinian National Movement. (trans. David Harvey). Routledge. ISBN 978-0-714-63432-6.
- "Establishment of Arab and Jewish Provisional Councils of Government – Working paper". United Nations Palestine Commission. 1948. § 24.
- Fieldhouse, David Kenneth (2006). Western Imperialism in the Middle east 1914-1958. Oxford University Press. ISBN 978-0-19-928737-6.
- Finkelstein, Norman (2008) [First published 2005]. Beyond Chutzpah. University of California Press. p. 322. ISBN 978-0-520-24989-9 – via Internet Archive.
- Finkelstein, Norman G. (17 October 2003). The Holocaust Industry: Reflections on the Exploitation of Jewish Suffering. Verso Books. p. 25. ISBN 978-1-78168-440-5.
- Fisk, Robert (2006). The Great War for Civilisation: The Conquest of the Middle East. HarperPerennial. ISBN 978-1-84115-008-6.
- Fountain, Rick (5 July 2001). "Nazis planned Palestine subversion". BBC News.
- Friedman, Isaiah (2000). Palestine: A Twice-Promised Land? The British, the Arabs & Zionism, 1915–1920. Vol. 1. New Brunswick and London: Transaction. ISBN 978-1-56000-391-5.
- "Full official record: What the mufti said to Hitler". The Times of Israel. 21 October 2015.
- Gallagher, Nancy Elizabeth (13 May 2007). Quakers in the Israeli-Palestinian Conflict: The Dilemmas of NGO Humanitarian Activism. American Univ in Cairo Press. ISBN 978-977-416-105-6 – via Google Books.
- Gavish, Haya (2010). Unwitting Zionists: The Jewish Community of Zakho in Iraqi Kurdistan. Wayne State University Press. ISBN 978-0-814-33366-2.
- Gelvin, James L. (2007) [First published 2005]. The Israel-Palestine Conflict: One Hundred Years of War. Cambridge University Press. ISBN 978-0-521-88835-6.
- Gelvin, James L. (13 January 2014). The Israel-Palestine Conflict: One Hundred Years of War. Cambridge University Press. pp. 119–120. ISBN 978-1-107-47077-4.
- Gensicke, Klaus (2011). The Mufti of Jerusalem and the Nazis: The Berlin Years. Vallentine Mitchell. ISBN 978-0-853-03844-3.
- Ghandour, Zeina B. (2009). A Discourse on Domination in Mandate Palestine: Imperialism, Property and Insurgency. London: Routledge. ISBN 978-1-13400-963-3.
- Gonen, Rivka (2003). Contested holiness: Jewish, Muslim, and Christian perspectives on the Temple Mount in Jerusalem. Publishing House. p. 141. ISBN 978-0-88125-798-4 – via Internet Archive.
- Gordon, Neve (24 March 2008). "Shadowplays". The Nation.
- Great Britain (1930). Report of the Commission on the disturbances of August 1929 (Shaw Commission report). Command paper 3530.
- Günther, Niklas; Zankel, Sönke (2006). Günther, Niklas; Zankel, Sönke (eds.). Abrahams Enkel Juden, Christen, Muslime und die Schoa. Franz Steiner Verlag. ISBN 978-3-515-08979-1.
- Gutman, Israel (1995). Encyclopedia of the Holocaust. Vol. 1. Macmillan Library Reference USA. ISBN 978-0-02-546705-7.
- "Hajj Amin al-Husayni: Wartime Propagandist". Holocaust Encyclopedia. United States Holocaust Memorial Museum.
- Hall, Michael R (2008). "Husseini, Haj Amin al". In Tucker, Spencer C.; Roberts, Priscilla (eds.). The Encyclopedia of the Arab-Israeli Conflict: A Political, Social, and Military History. Vol. II. ABC-CLIO. p. 464. ISBN 978-1-85109-841-5.
- Hen-Tov, Jacob (1974). Communism and Zionism in Palestine: The Comintern and the Political Unrest in the 1920s. Transaction. ISBN 978-0-870-73326-0.
- Hershco, Tsilla (March 2006). "Le grand mufti de Jérusalem en France: Histoire d'une évasion" (PDF). Controverses (in French). No. 1.
- Hilberg, Raul (1973) [First published 1961]. The Destruction of the European Jews. New York: New Viewpoints.
- Hirszowicz, Lukasz (1966). The Third Reich and the Arab East. Routledge & K. Paul. ISBN 978-0-8020-1398-9.
- Hoare, Marko Attila (2013). The Bosnian Muslims in the Second World War: A History. London: C. Hust and Co. p. 53. ISBN 978-1-84904-241-3.
- Hoare, Marko Attila (2014). Bosnian Muslims in the Second World War. Oxford University Press. ISBN 978-0-199-32785-0.
- Höpp, Gerhard (2004). "In the Shadow of the Moon". In Schwanitz, Wolfgang G. (ed.). Germany and the Middle East 1871–1945. Princeton: Markus Wiener. pp. 217–221. ISBN 978-1-558-76298-5.
- Höpp, Gerhard; Wien, Peter (2010). "The Suppressed Discourse: Arab Victims of National Socialism". In Liebau, Heike; Bromber, Katrin; Lange, Katharina; Hamzah, Dyala; Ahuja, Ravi (eds.). The World in World Wars: Experiences, Perceptions and Perspectives from Africa and Asia. Brill. pp. 167–216. ISBN 978-9-004-18545-6.
- Hopwood, Derek (1980). "Amin al-Husayni". In Bosworth, Clifford Edmund (ed.). The Encyclopaedia of Islam, New Edition: Supplement, Parts 1-2. Leiden: Brill Archive. pp. 67–70. ISBN 978-9-004-06167-5.
- Hughes, Matthew (2019). Britain's Pacification of Palestine: The British Army, the Colonial State, and the Arab Revolt, 1936–1939. Cambridge University Press. ISBN 978-1-107-10320-7.
- Huneidi, Sahar (2001). A Broken Trust, Herbert Samuel, Zionism and the Palestinians. I.B.Tauris. ISBN 978-1-86064-172-5.
- Jbara, Taysir (1985). Palestinian Leader, Hajj Amin Al-Husayni, Mufti of Jerusalem. Kingston Press Series. ISBN 978-0-940670-21-1.
- Kamel, Lorenzo (2013). "Hajj Amīn al-Ḥusaynī, the "creation" of a leader". Storicamente. 9. doi:10.12977/stor490.
- Karmi, Ghada (2004). In Search of Fatima: A Palestinian Story. Verso. ISBN 978-1-859-84561-5.
- Kassim, Anis F. (1 June 1988). Palestine Yearbook of International Law 1987-1988. Vol. 4. Kluwer Law International. ISBN 978-90-411-0341-3.
- Khalaf, Issa (1991). Politics in Palestine: Arab Factionalism and Social Disintegration, 1939-1948. SUNY. ISBN 978-0-791-40708-0.
- Khalidi, Rashid (1997). "The Formation of Palestinian Identity: The Critical Years, 1917-1923". In Jankowski, James; Gershoni, Israel (eds.). Rethinking Nationalism in the Arab Middle East. Columbia University Press. pp. 171–189. ISBN 978-0-231-10695-5.
- Khalidi, Rashid (2001). "The Palestinians and 1948: the underlying causes of failure". In Eugene L., Rogan; Shlaim, Avi (eds.). The war for Palestine: rewriting the history of 1948. Cambridge University Press. pp. 12–36. ISBN 978-0-521-79476-3.
- Khalidi, Rashid (2020). The Hundred Years' War on Palestine. Henry Holt and Company. pp. 42–43. ISBN 978-1-62779-854-9.
- Kiely, Robert S. (2008). "Anti-Semitism". In Tucker, Spencer C. (ed.). The Encyclopedia of the Arab-Israeli Conflict: A Political, Social, and Military History. ABC-CLIO. pp. 110–114. ISBN 978-1-851-09842-2.
- Kimmerling, Baruch; Migdal, Joel S. (2003). Law Order and Riots in Mandatory Palestine, 1928- 1935. Harvard University Press. ISBN 978-0-674-01129-8.
- Kohn, Hans (1929). A History of Nationalism in the East. Taylor & Francis. ISBN 978-0-403-00079-1.
- Kolinsky, Martin (1993). Law Order and Riots in Mandatory Palestine, 1928- 1935. London: Macmillan. ISBN 978-0-333-53995-8.
- Kopel, Henry (2021). "9: Twentieth Century, Part I". War on Hate. London: Lexington Books. p. 232. ISBN 978-1-7936-2761-2.
- Kotzin, Daniel P. (2010). Judah L. Magnes: An American Jewish Nonconformist. Syracuse University Press. pp. 251–. ISBN 978-0-8156-5109-3.
- Krämer, Gudrun (2008). A History of Palestine: From the Ottoman Conquest to the Founding of the State of Israel. Princeton, New Jersey: Princeton University Press. ISBN 978-0-691-11897-0.
- Kupferschmidt, Uri M. (1987). The Supreme Muslim Council: Islam under the British mandate for Palestine. Leiden, New York: E.J. Brill. ISBN 978-90-04-07929-8.
- Lachman, Shai (1982). "Arab Rebellion and Terrorism in Palestine 1929-1939". In Kedourie, Elie; Haim, Sylvie G. (eds.). Zionism and Arabism in Palestine and Israel. Frank Cass. ISBN 978-0-714-63169-1.
- Landsman, Stephan (2005). Crimes of the Holocaust: The Law Confronts Hard Cases. University of Pennsylvania Press. ISBN 978-0-812-23847-1.
- Laqueur, Walter (1970) [First published 1969]. The Israel-Arab Reader: A Documentary History of the Middle East Conflict. Penguin Books. ISBN 978-0-140-29713-3.
- Laqueur, Walter (2003). A History of Zionism (3rd ed.). Tauris Parke Paperbacks. ISBN 978-1-860-64932-5.
- Laqueur, Walter; Joffe, Alexander H. (November 2006). "An Interview with Walter Laqueur". Covenant: Global Jewish Magazine. Vol. 1, no. 1. Herzliya. Archived from the original on 26 November 2012.
- Laqueur, Walter; Rubin, Barry M (2001). The Israel-Arab Reader: A Documentary History of the Middle East Conflict (6th ed.). Penguin Books. ISBN 978-0-14-029713-3 – via Internet Archive.
- Laurens, Henry (1999). L'invention de la Terre sainte. La Question de Palestine (in French). Vol. 1. Paris: Fayard. ISBN 978-2-84406-388-5.
- Laurens, Henry (2002). Une mission sacrée de civilisation. La Question de Palestine (in French). Vol. 2. Paris: Fayard. ISBN 978-2-213-60349-0.
- Laurens, Henry (2007). Une mission sacrée de civilisation. La Question de Palestine (in French). Vol. 3. Paris: Fayard. ISBN 978-2-213-63358-9.
- Lebor, Adam; Boyes, Roger (2000). Surviving Hitler. Simon & Schuster. ISBN 978-0-684-85811-1.
- Lepre, George (1997). Himmler's Bosnian Division; The Waffen-SS Handschar Division 1943-1945. Schiffer Publishing. ISBN 978-0-7643-0134-6.
- Levenberg, Haim (1993). Military Preparations of the Arab Community in Palestine: 1945-1948. Frank Cass. ISBN 978-0-7146-3439-5.
- Lewis, Bernard (1997) [First published 1995]. The Middle East: A Brief History of the Last 2,000 Years. Simon and Schuster. ISBN 978-0-684-83280-7.
- Lewis, Bernard (1999). Semites and Anti-Semites: An Inquiry into Conflict and Prejudice. W.W. Norton & Company. ISBN 978-0-393-31839-5.
- Lewis, Bernard (2002) [First published 1984]. The Jews of Islam. Greenwood Publishing Group. ISBN 978-1-4008-1023-9.
- Lukitz, Liora (1995). Iraq: The Search for National Identity. Routledge. ISBN 978-0-714-64550-6.
- Mackenzie, S. P. (2006). The Colditz Myth: British and Commonwealth Prisoners of War in Nazi. Oxford University Press. ISBN 978-0-199-20307-9.
- Mallmann, Klaus Michael; Cüppers, Martin (2006b). Matthäus, Jürgen; Mallmann, Klaus-Michael (eds.). Deutsche - Juden - Völkermord. Der Holocaust als Geschichte und Gegenwart [Germans, Jews, Genocide – The Holocaust as History and Present] (in German). Darmstadt: Wissenschaftliche Buchgesellschaft. ISBN 978-3-534-18481-1.
- Mallmann, Klaus Michael; Cüppers, Martin (2010). Matthäus, Jürgen; Mallmann, Klaus-Michael (eds.). Nazi Palestine: The Plans for the Extermination of the Jews in Palestine. Enigma Books. ISBN 978-1-936-27418-5.
- Mallmann, Klaus-Michael; Cüppers, Martin (2006a). Halbmond und Hakenkreuz. Das Dritte Reich, die Araber und Palästina. Darmstadt: Wissenschaftliche Buchgesellschaft. ISBN 978-3-534-19729-3.
- Mattar, Philip (1984). "Al-Husayni and Iraq's quest for independence, 1939-1941". Arab Studies Quarterly. 6 (4): 267–281. JSTOR 41857733.
- Mattar, Philip (1988). "The Mufti of Jerusalem and the Politics of Palestine". Middle East Journal. 42 (2): 227–240. JSTOR 4327735.
- Mattar, Philip (1992). The Mufti of Jerusalem: Al-Hajj Amin al-Husayni and the Palestinian National Movement. Columbia University Press. ISBN 978-0-231-06463-7.
- Matthews, Weldon C. (2006). Confronting an Empire, Constructing a Nation: Arab Nationalists and Popular Politics in Mandate Palestine. I. B. Tauris. ISBN 978-1-845-11173-1.
- Medoff, Rafael (1996). "The Mufti's Nazi Years Re-examined". Journal of Israeli History. 17 (3): 317–333. doi:10.1080/13531049608576090.
- Mikics, David (3 February 2014). "Did Zionism Cause the Holocaust? A New Biography Says Yes". Tablet Magazine. Archived from the original on 25 August 2014.
- Milstein, Uri; Sacks, Alan (1997). History of the War of Independence: The first month. University Press of America. ISBN 978-0-7618-0721-6.
- Milton-Edwards, Beverly (1999). Islamic Politics in Palestine. I. B. Tauris. p. 25. ISBN 978-0-8223-2814-8 – via Internet Archive.
- Mitchell, Thomas G. (2013). Israel/Palestine and the Politics of a Two-State Solution. McFarland. p. 134. ISBN 978-0-7864-7597-1.
- Mojzes, Paul (2011). Balkan Genocides: Holocaust and Ethnic Cleansing in the Twentieth Century. Rowman & Littlefield. ISBN 978-1-442-20665-6.
- Monk, Daniel Bertrand (2002). An Aesthetic Occupation: The Immediacy of Architecture and the Palestine Conflict. Duke University Press. ISBN 978-0-8223-2814-8.
- Morris, Benny (1997). Israel's Border Wars, 1949-1956: Arab Infiltration, Israeli Retaliation, and the Countdown to the Suez War. Oxford University Press. ISBN 978-0-19-829262-3.
- Morris, Benny (2008). 1948: a history of the first Arab-Israeli war. Yale University Press. ISBN 978-0-300-12696-9.
- Morris, Benny (2011) [First published 1999]. Righteous victims: a history of the Zionist-Arab conflict. Knopf. ISBN 978-0-679-74475-7.
- Morris, Benny (14 June 2011). "Reconsidering the 1948 Arab-Israeli War". LSE – via YouTube.
  - Formerly hosted at lse.ac.uk
- Netanyahu, Binyamin (20 October 2015). "PM Netanyahu's Speech at the 37th Zionist Congress". Prime Minister's Office.
- Nevo, Joseph (January 1984). "Al-Hajj Amin and the British in World War II". Middle Eastern Studies. 20 (1): 3–16. doi:10.1080/00263208408700568. JSTOR 4282974.
- "New Document Releases MI5 Files" (PDF). London: The National Archives. July 2001. Archived (PDF) from the original on 2 April 2014.
- Nicosia, Francis R. (2000). The Third Reich and the Palestine Question. Transaction. ISBN 978-0-7658-0624-6.
- Nicosia, Francis R. (2008). "Hajj Amin al-Husayni: The Mufti of Jerusalem". United States Holocaust Memorial Museum. United States Holocaust Memorial Museum.
- Nicosia, Francis R. (2017). Nazi Germany and the Arab World. Cambridge University Press. pp. 187–188. ISBN 978-1-107-66481-4.
- Novick, Peter (2000). The Holocaust in American Life. Houghton Mifflin Harcourt. ISBN 978-0-618-08232-2.
- Ovendale, Ritchie (2004). The Origins of the Arab-Israeli Wars (4th ed.). Pearson Education. ISBN 978-0-582-82320-4.
- Pappé, Ilan (1994). The Making of the Arab-Israeli Conflict, 1947–1951. I.B. Tauris. ISBN 978-1-85043-819-9.
- Pappé, Ilan (2010). The Rise and Fall of a Palestinian Dynasty: The Husaynis, 1700–1948. Translated by Lotan, Yaer. Berkeley and Los Angeles, California: University of California Press. ISBN 978-0-520-26839-5.
- Pearlman, Moshe (1947). Mufti of Jerusalem: The Story of Haj Amin el Husseini. V Gollancz.
- Pearlman, Moshe (1963). The capture and trial of Adolf Eichmann. Weidenfeld and Nicolson.
- Peretz, Don (1994) [First published 1963]. Armed Struggle and the Search for State: The Palestinian National Movement, 1949–1993. Continuum Publishing. ISBN 978-0-275-94576-3.
- Permanent Mandates Commission (21 June 1930). Minutes of the Seventeenth (Extraordinary) Session. League of Nations. Archived from the original on 6 April 2015 – via UNISPAL.
- Radosh, Ronald; Radosh, Allis (Summer 2008). "Righteous among the Editors — when the Left loved Israel". World Affairs. 171: 65–75. doi:10.3200/WAFS.171.1.65-75. Archived from the original on 15 June 2012.
- Ravid, Akiya (21 October 2015). "Historians, politicians slam PM's 'distortion of history'". Ynetnews.
- Rees, Philip (1990). Biographical Dictionary of the Extreme Right Since 1890. Simon & Schuster. ISBN 978-0-13-089301-7.
- Reiter, Yitzhak (1996). Islamic endowments in Jerusalem under British mandate. Routledge. ISBN 978-0-7146-4670-1.
- Reitlinger, Gerald Reitlinger (1971) [First published 1953]. The Final Solution. Sphere Books. ISBN 978-0-87668-951-6.
- Robinson, Glenn E. (1997). Building a Palestinian State: The Incomplete Revolution. Indiana University Press. ISBN 978-0-253-21082-1 – via Internet Archive.
- Rose, Norman (1989). Chaim Weitzmann: A Biography. Penguin Books. ISBN 978-0-14-012230-5.
- Rosen, David M. (2005). Armies of the Young: Child Soldiers in War and Terrorism. Rutgers University. ISBN 978-0-8135-3568-5.
- Rouleau, Éric [in French] (August 1994). "Qui était le mufti de Jérusalem ?(Who was the Mufti of Jerusalem?)". Le Monde diplomatique.
- Rubin, Barry; Schwanit, Wolfgang G. (25 February 2014). Nazis, Islamists, and the Making of the Modern Middle East. New Haven: Yale University Press. p. 7. ISBN 978-0-300-14090-3.
- Rudoren, Jodi (21 October 2015). "Netanyahu Draws Broad Criticism After Saying a Palestinian Inspired Holocaust". The New York Times.
- Sachar, Howard Morley (1961). Aliyah: The People of Israel. World Publishing Company.
- Sachar, Howard Morley (1972). Europe leaves the Middle East, 1936–1954. Knopf. ISBN 978-0-394-46064-2.
- Sachar, Howard Morley (2006) [First published 1976]. A History of Israel: From the Rise of Zionism to Our Time (3rd ed.). Alfred A. Knopf. ISBN 978-0-375-71132-9.
- Said, Edward (1988). Blaming the Victims: Spurious Scholarship and the Palestinian Question. London: Verso. p. 248. ISBN 1-85984-340-9 – via Internet Archive. "This committee, chaired by Palestine's national leader, Hajj Amin al-Hussaini, represented the Palestinian Arab national consensus, had the backing of the Palestinian political parties that functioned in Palestine, and was recognized in some form by Arab governments as the voice of the Palestinian people, until the Palestine Liberation Organization acquired its representative character."
- Said, Edward; Hitchens, Christopher, eds. (1988). Blaming the victims: spurious scholarship and the Palestinian question. Verso. ISBN 978-0-86091-175-3 – via Internet Archive.
- Samuel, Edwin (1970). A Lifetime in Jerusalem: The Memoirs of the Second Viscount Samuel. Abelard-Schuman, Israel University Press. ISBN 978-0-87855-181-1.
- Sayigh, Yezid (1999) [First published 1997]. Armed Struggle and the Search for State: The Palestinian National Movement, 1949-1993. Oxford University Press. ISBN 978-0-19-829643-0.
- Schechtman, Joseph B. (1965). The Mufti and the Fuehrer: The rise and fall of Haj Amin el-Husseini. T. Yoseloff.
- Schechtman, Joseph B. (1986). The Life and Times of Vladimir Jabotinsky: Rebel and statesman. SP Books. ISBN 978-0-935437-18-8.
- Schlor, Joachim (1999). Tel Aviv: From Dream to City. Reaktion Books. ISBN 978-1-86189-033-7.
- Scholch, Alexander (November 1985). "The Demographic Development of Palestine 1850-1882". International Journal of Middle East Studies. XII (4): 485–505. doi:10.1017/S0020743800029445. S2CID 154921401.
- Schwanitz, Wolfgang G. (2004). Germany and the Middle East, 1871–1945. Markus Wiener. ISBN 978-1-558-76298-5.
- Schwanitz, Wolfgang G. (8 May 2008). "Amin al-Husaini and the Holocaust. What Did the Grand Mufti Know?". World Politics Review.
- Schwanitz, Wolfgang G.; Rubin, Barry (2014). Nazis, Islamists, and the Making of the Modern Middle East. Yale University Press. ISBN 978-0-300-14090-3.
- Segev, Tom (2001). One Palestine, Complete: Jews and Arabs Under the British Mandate. Owl Books. ISBN 0-8050-6587-3 – via Internet Archive.
- Sela, Avraham (2002). Continuum political encyclopedia of the Middle East. Bloomsbury Academic. p. 360. ISBN 978-0-8264-1413-7.
- Sells, Michael A. (2015). "Holocaust Abuse: The Case of Hajj Muhammad Amin al-Husayni". Journal of Religious Ethics. 43 (4): 723–759. doi:10.1111/jore.12119. JSTOR 24586167.
- Shay, Shaul (2009) [First published 2007]. Islamic Terror and the Balkans. Transaction Publishers/Interdisciplinary Center Herzliya. ISBN 978-1-412-80931-3.
- Shlaim, Avi (2000). The Iron Wall: Israel and the Arab World. Penguin Books. ISBN 978-0-14-028870-4.
- Shlaim, Avi (2001). "Israel and the Arab Coalition". In Rogan, Eugene; Shlaim, Avi (eds.). The War for Palestine: rewriting the history of 1948. Cambridge University Press. pp. 79–103. ISBN 978-0-521-69934-1.
- Sicker, Martin (2000). Pangs of the Messiah: The Troubled Birth of the Jewish State. Greenwood Publishing Group. ISBN 978-0-275-96638-6.
- Simon, Reeva S. (2004). Iraq Between the Two World Wars: The Militarist Origins of Tyranny (2nd ed.). Columbia University Press. ISBN 978-0-231-13215-2.
- Spoerl, Joseph S. (2020). "Parallels between Nazi and Islamist Anti-Semitism". Jewish Political Studies Review. 31 (1/2). Jerusalem Center for Public Affairs: 210–244. ISSN 0792-335X. JSTOR 26870795.
- Stangneth, Bettina (2015). Eichmann Before Jerusalem: The Unexamined Life of a Mass Murderer. Translated by Ruth Martin. Vintage. ISBN 978-0-307-95016-1.
- Stein, George H. (1984). The Waffen SS: Hitler's Elite Guard at War, 1939-1945. Cornell University Press. p. 184. ISBN 978-0-801-49275-4 – via Internet Archive.
- Stillman, Norman (2000). "Frenchman, Jews, or Arabs? Jews of the Arab World between European Colonialism, Zionism, and Arab Nationalism". In Hary, Benjamin H.; Hayeseds, John Lewis; Astren, Fred (eds.). Judaism and Islam: Boundaries, Communications, and Interaction: Essays in Honor of William M. Brinner. Brill. pp. 123–138. ISBN 978-90-04-11914-7 – via Internet Archive.
- Storrs, Sir Ronald (1972). The memoirs of Sir Ronald Storrs. Ayer Publishing. ISBN 978-0-405-04593-6.
- Strangneth, Bettina (2004). Eichmann before Jerusalem. London: The Bodley Head. ISBN 978-1-84792-323-3.
- Swedenburg, Ted (2003). Memories of revolt: the 1936-1939 rebellion and the Palestinian national past. Fayetteville: University of Arkansas Press. ISBN 978-1-55728-763-2.
- Taggar, Yehuda (1994). "The Mufti of Jerusalem and Palestine Arab Politics, 1930-1937". The Formation of Modern Iraq and Syria. Routledge. ISBN 978-0-7146-4557-5.
- Tauber, Eliezer (1994). The Formation of Modern Iraq and Syria. Routledge. ISBN 978-0-7146-4557-5.
- Tomasevich, Jozo (2001). War and revolution in Yugoslavia, 1941-1945: occupation and collaboration. Stanford University Press. ISBN 978-0-8047-3615-2.
- Tripp, Charles (2002). A history of Iraq (2nd.(rev.) ed.). Cambridge University Press. ISBN 978-0-521-52900-6.
- Tschirgi, Dan (2004). "Palestine 2003: the perils of de facto statehood". In Bahcheli, Tozun; Bartmann, Barry; Srebnik, Henry (eds.). The Quest for Sovereignty. Routledge. pp. 123–138. ISBN 978-1-135-77121-8.
- Wien, Peter (2016). "The Holocaust5: Narratives of Complicity and Victimhood". In Meri, Josef (ed.). The Routledge Handbook of Muslim-Jewish Relations. Routledge. pp. 373–386. ISBN 978-1-317-38321-5.
- Yaeger, Patricia (1996). Geography of Identity. University of Michigan Press. ISBN 978-0-472-10672-1.
- Yahil, Leni; Friedman, Ina; Galai, Haya (1991). The Holocaust: The Fate of European Jewry, 1932–1945. Oxford University Press. ISBN 978-0-19-504523-9.
- Yisraeli, David (1974). The Palestine Problem in German Politics 1889-1945. Ramat Gan: Bar Ilan University.
- Zankel, Sönke (2006). "Der Jude als Anti-Muslim: Amin al-Husseini und die "Judenfrage"". In Günther, Niklas; Zankel, Sönke (eds.). Abrahams Enkel Juden, Christen, Muslime und die Schoa (in German). Franz Steiner Verlag. pp. 41–51. ISBN 978-3-515-08979-1.
- Zertal, Idith (2005). Israel's Holocaust and the Politics of Nationhood. Cambridge University Press. ISBN 978-0-521-85096-4.

Political offices
New office	President of Palestine; 1948–1953	Vacant Title next held by Yasser Arafat
