= Survey of Palestine (disambiguation) =

The Survey of Palestine was the survey and mapping department of the British Mandatory Government (1920–48).

Survey of Palestine may also refer to:

- Survey of Palestine (Anglo-American Committee), a broad-based review of the country for the Anglo-American Committee (1945-46)
- PEF Survey of Palestine, the Palestine Exploration Fund survey (1872–1880)
