= Patricia Smith Yaeger =

American academic and literary critic

Patricia Smith Yaeger was an American academic and literary critic.

== Biography ==
Yaeger studied at Bryn Mawr College, receiving her BA in 1972. She took a Ph. D. at Yale University in 1980. She began her teaching career with posts at Williams College, the University of Pennsylvania and Harvard University before becoming an associate professor at the University of Michigan in 1990. She was promoted to professor in 1999 and named the Henry Simmons Frieze Collegiate Professor of English and Women's Studies in 2005. At the time of her death from ovarian cancer, she was researching the concept of the "female sublime". Yaeger died at her home. She was survived by her husband and two children. Yaeger received the Faculty Recognition Award from the University of Michigan in 2001.

== Publications ==
From 2006 until 2011, she edited the journal Publications of the Modern Language Association. She is the author of Honey-Mad Women: Emancipatory Strategies in Women's Writing (1988), The Geography of Identity (1996) and Dirt and Desire: Reconstructing Southern Women's Writing 1930-1990 (2000).
