= Survey of Palestine (Anglo-American Committee) =

Study published in 1945–1947

Survey of Palestine Volume I

Survey of Palestine Volume II

The Survey of Palestine was a two volume survey of Mandatory Palestine prepared between December 1945 and March 1946, as evidence for the Anglo-American Committee of Inquiry. A supplement was published in June 1947.

== Bibliography ==
- Nachmani, Amikam (2005). Great Power Discord in Palestine: The Anglo-American Committee of Inquiry Into the Problems of European Jewry and Palestine 1945-46. Routledge. ISBN 978-1-135-77940-5.
