= Hashomer =

Zionist paramilitary organization (1909–1920)

HaShomer
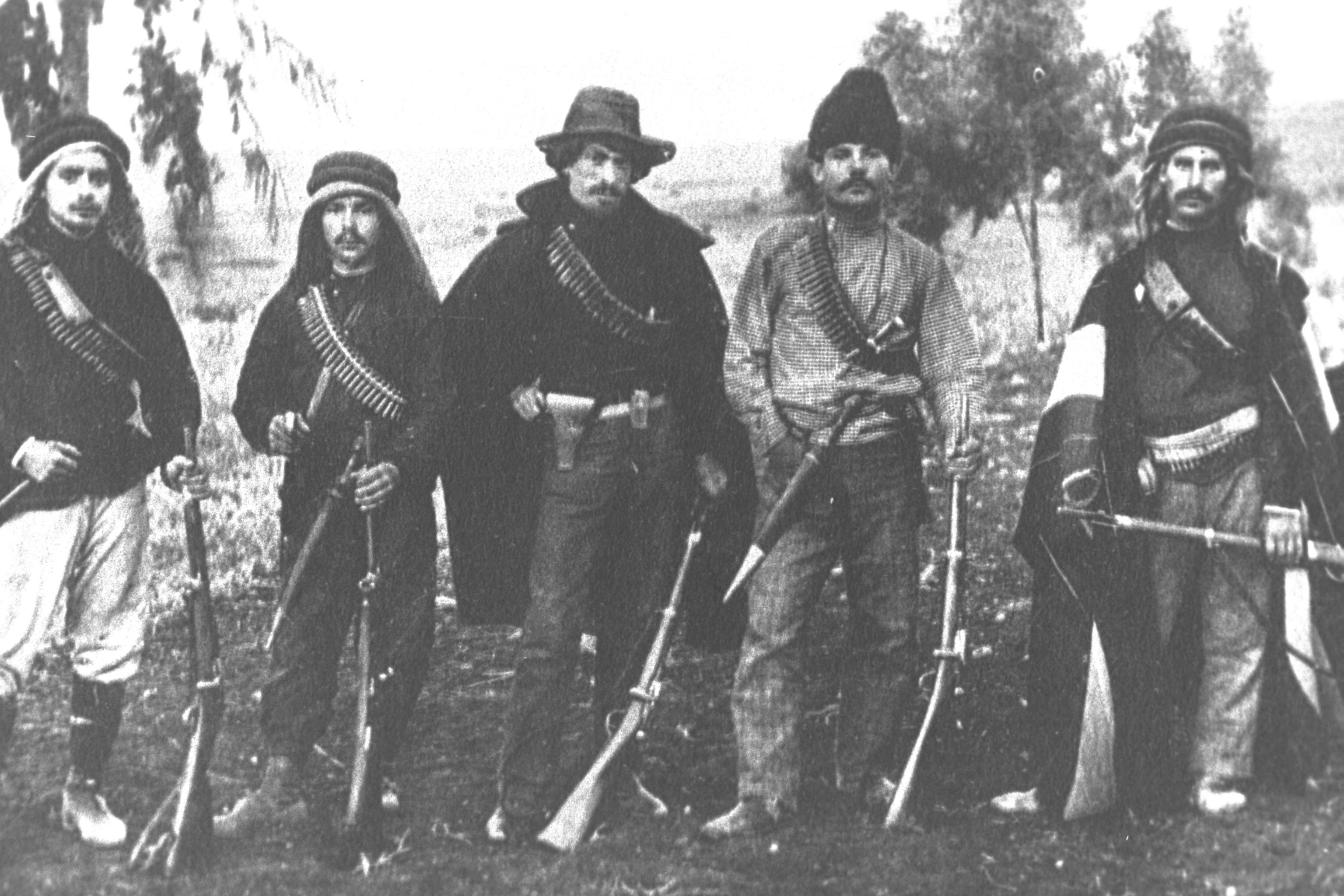
- Members of Hashomer circa 1909. Israel Shochat in center.
- Active: 1909–1920
- Country: Ottoman Empire; Mandatory Palestine
- Allegiance: Yishuv
- Type: Paramilitary
- Role: Defense of Jewish settlements

Hashomer (Hebrew: השומר, 'The Watchman') was a Jewish Zionist defense organization in Palestine founded in April 1909. It was an outgrowth of the Bar-Giora group and was disbanded after the founding of the Haganah in 1920. Hashomer was responsible for guarding Zionist settlements in Palestine. The organization also sought to replace Arab guards employed by Jewish settlements in its promotion of "Hebrew labour". It was headed by a committee of three: Israel Shochat, Israel Giladi and Mendel Portugali.

== History ==
=== Background ===
Hashomer was originated by Zionist socialists, most of whom were members of Poale Zion including Israel Shochat, Manya Shochat, Yitzhak Ben-Zvi and Ben-Zvi's wife Rachel Yanait, several of whom had earlier formed a small secret guard society called Bar-Giora, which guarded the Sejera commune (now Ilaniya) and Mes'ha (now Kfar Tavor). Bar Giora was founded on September 29, 1907, by Israel Shochat, Alexander Zaïd, Yehezkel Henkin in the apartment of Yitzhak Ben-Zvi which was in Jaffa.

=== Founding ===
On April 12, 1909, the Bar-Giora leadership decided at a meeting in Kfar Tavor to disband their organization and create a larger one, Hashomer. While earlier settlers had undertaken to defend their lands and communities, Hashomer was the first attempt to provide an organized defence for all the Jewish communities in Palestine.

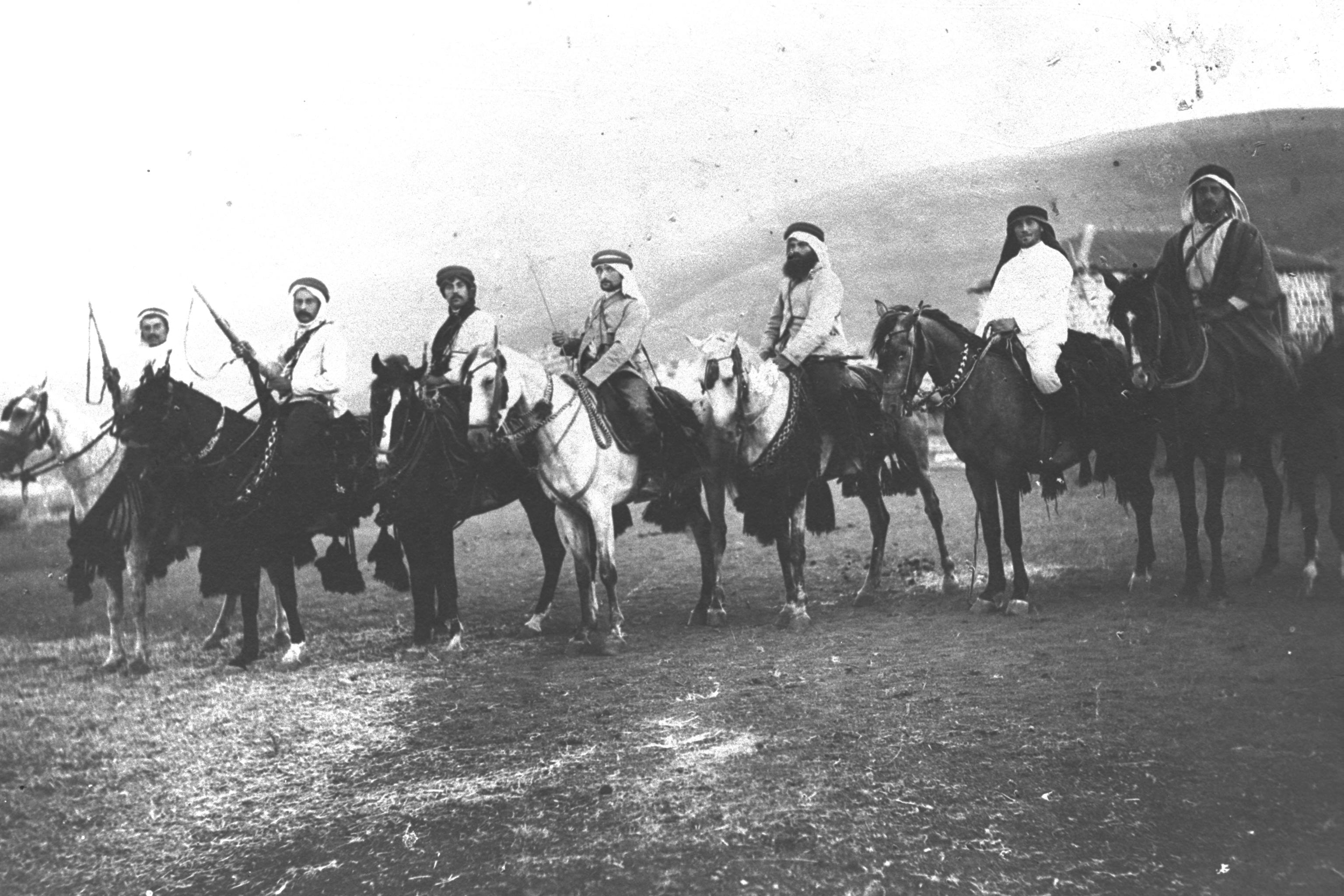
Members of Hashomer on horseback at Kfar Giladi

By 1910 Yehezkel Henkin was the first of the Shomer people to ride horseback so he became a riding guard. He taught other “Watchmen” how to ride. This prompted the committee to buy him a horse that he named "Tzipora".

In the autumn of 1911 Manya Shochat wrote, on behalf of Hashomer, to Menachem Ussishkin in Odessa asking for money. In her letter she stated that in 1910 Hashomer had “35 watchmen, 23 infantry and 12 cavalry”, and were guarding six colonies in Galilee as well as Hadera.

A serious obstacle was the lack of funds with which to buy arms. On Yehoshua Hankin's advice, they asked Eliahu Krause, the manager at Sejera, to lend them the money. The first guns were bought, several of the members refusing to part from them even for a moment.

Members of Hashomer circa 1910

They adopted local dress, and many of the customs of the Bedouins, Druze and Circassians. They also drew inspiration from the history of the Cossacks. The first few shomrim (guards), worked on foot, but soon acquired horses, which vastly increased their effectiveness.

Guns used were the same as the locals', which included the 'jift', a single, or double-barrelled shotgun, the 'yunani' and 'osmanli' single-shot muskets, various rifles and Mauser pistols. Modern rifles, known as 'Abu-Hamsa' (father of five), were the most prestigious, and were prone to theft by the locals. The 'shibriyeh' (Arab dagger) and 'nabut' (club or mace) were carried by all. Ammunition was expensive and hard to come by, so primitive production centers were set up.

By 1912, Hashomer was guarding fourteen Jewish settlements. In addition to guarding settlements, Hashomer secretly began developing offensive capabilities, seeing itself as the nucleus of a future Jewish army. It raided Arab villages to beat or kill residents who had harmed Jews. Mounted on their horses, Hashomer vigilantes raided a few Arab settlements to punish residents who had harmed Jews, sometimes beating them up, sometimes executing them. In one case, a special clandestine assembly of Hashomer members decided to eliminate a Bedouin policeman, Aref al-Arsan, who had assisted the Turks and tortured Jewish prisoners. He was shot dead by Hashomer in June 1916.

During World War I, Hashomer was violently opposed to NILI, a Jewish spy network working for the British in Ottoman Palestine. Hashomer feared that the Turks would discover the spies and wreak vengeance against the entire Jewish community. When they failed to get NILI to cease operations or to hand over a stash of gold coins they’d received from the British, they made an attempt on the life of Yosef Lishansky, one of its members, managing only to wound him. Later the Turks caught Lishansky, and he allegedly told them all he knew under torture, implicating twelve members of Hashomer. The group nonetheless survived.

Hashomer was successful in providing defense for settlements throughout the country; though it sometimes aroused the ire of Arab watchmen, who lost their jobs, and of pilferers, and antagonized the Arab population by retaliatory raids. Some of the older settlers were also worried that Hashomer might upset the status-quo with the local population. During World War I many of its members were exiled to Anatolia by the Ottoman government because they were enemy (Russian) nationals. Several were hanged.

Caption from source: "Delivering the flag of HaShomer to the Jewish Legion during the volunteer period (standing third from left is Rachel Yanait). Emblazoned on the center of the flag: "HaShomer." The lettering above it reads "In blood and fire Judea fell," and the lettering below reads "In blood and fire Judea will rise." Unidentified location, undated."

In 1920 it was decided to organize the Haganah, a much broader-based group, to cope with new defense challenges and needs of the growing Jewish community in Palestine. Many members of Hashomer joined the Jewish Legion, while others joined the mounted police, and played a prominent part in the defense of Tel Hai and Jerusalem during the Arab riots in 1920 and 1921. In June 1920 HaShomer ceased to exist as a separate body. Its members, however, maintained contact and made an important contribution to the Yishuv's defense. The Haganah itself became the core of the Israel Defense Forces (IDF).

In addition to their role as watchmen of the Jewish settlements in the country, members of Hashomer established a number of settlements of their own, including Tel Adash, Tel Hai, and Kfar Giladi.

During its ten years existence Hashomer had at most 100 members, 23 of them women. Most of them came from a small number of families who believed they were on the verge of becoming the leaders of Palestine's Jews.

Professor Gur Alroey, Dean of Humanities at the University of Haifa, described the Hashomer as "...illiterate people, chauvinist. They spoke Yiddish and not Hebrew. Even a poor Yiddish, they curse a lot. They were people I wouldn't like to meet in a boulevard at midnight."

== Members of Hashomer ==
=== Notable members ===
- Yehezkel Nisanov
- Israel Shochat
- Manya Shochat
- Yitzhak Ben-Zvi
- Alexander Zaïd
- Mendel Portugali
- Israel Giladi
- Eliyahu Golomb
- Yaacov Pat

The founders of the organization and most of its members were pioneers who arrived in the Land of Israel during the Second Aliyah period. Some of them were active even before their immigration in underground movements and Jewish self-defense against pogroms in Eastern Europe in the early 20th century.

Yitzhak Henkin, for example, was considered a hero of Jewish defense in Homel, and was persecuted by the authorities for this. Moshe Givoni (Goldshtein) was one of the organizers of Jewish self-defense in Yuzovka and Kishinev. Israel Shochat was active in the "Poalei Zion" movement and the Jewish self-defense organization in Grodno, and his wife Manya Shochat was active, before immigrating to the Land of Israel, in the "Bund" party (a non-Zionist Jewish workers' party), and in 1898 she was imprisoned for her underground activities.

Many of the Jewish workers who established "HaShomer" were from Jewish families of the middle and lower classes, who arrived in the country penniless. Alexander Zaïd recounted that the only possession he had when he arrived in the country was his father's silver watch, which he gave as a "bribe" to Turkish soldiers in order to gain entry to the country. The two prominent figures in the organization's leadership who were not from the Second Aliyah were Yitzhak Navon, born to a Jewish family from Yemen, who met Alexander Zaid and Yitzhak Henkin in 1908 in Jerusalem, and Mordechai Yagal, who was born in the moshava of Zikhron Ya'akov.

== Commemoration ==
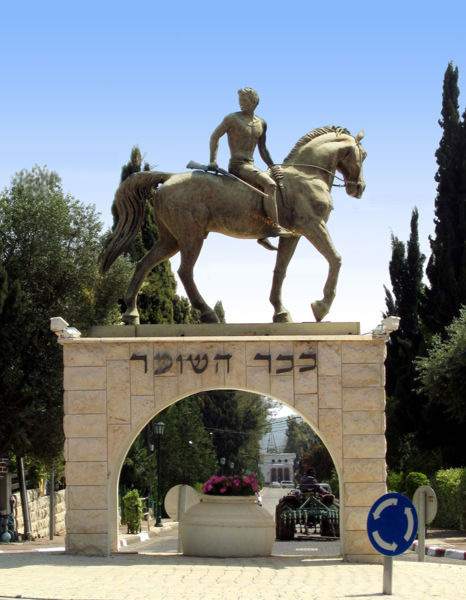
A monument to HaShomer in Kfar Tavor

In the 1930s, the "Hashomer" File was published, and in the 1950s, the "Sefer Hashomer: Divrei Chaverim" (Book of Hashomer: Words of Friends) and the "Sefer Toldot HaHaganah" (Book of the History of the Haganah) were published, which presented a wealth of materials about "Hashomer" and various approaches to understanding its operations. A significant part of the "Hashomer" archive, which included protocols of meetings and assemblies, letters and memoranda, was lost or destroyed during the years of World War I, especially after the exposure of the Nili underground network, and due to the extensive pursuit of "Hashomer" members by the Ottoman authorities.

- The plot of Hashomer members in Kfar Giladi - Tel Hai cemetery, named after Israel Giladi, a member of Hashomer's founding committee, where many Hashomer members are buried.
- The Beit Hashomer Museum operates in Kibbutz Kfar Giladi.
- A statue of a Hashomer member riding a horse was erected in Hashomer Square in Kfar Tavor.
- The "Hashomer Badge" was established in 1981 by the Israeli government and awarded to Hashomer members or their relatives.
- In 2007, by a government decision, a stamp was issued to commemorate the 100th anniversary of the Hashomer organization.

== Gallery ==
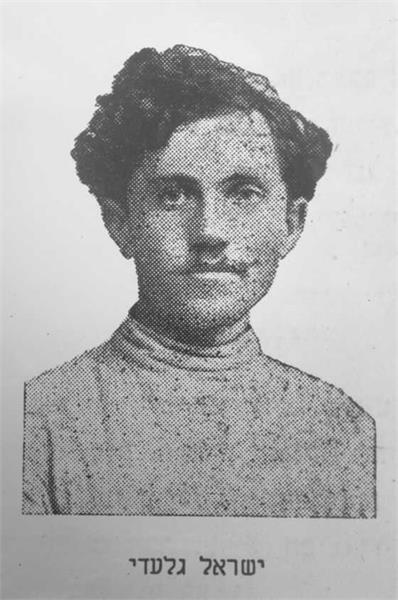
Israel Giladi

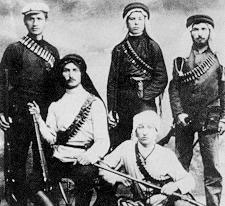
Hashomer members

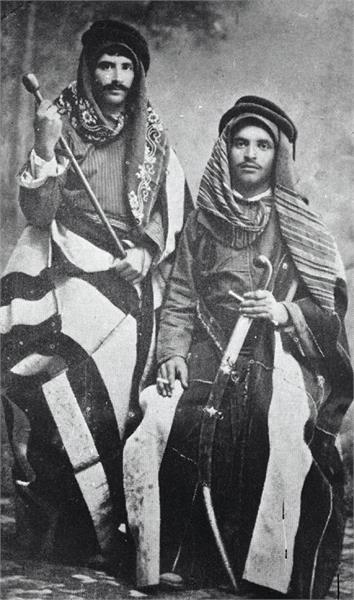
Hashomer members from Merhavia 1915

The IDF's Hashomer ribbon

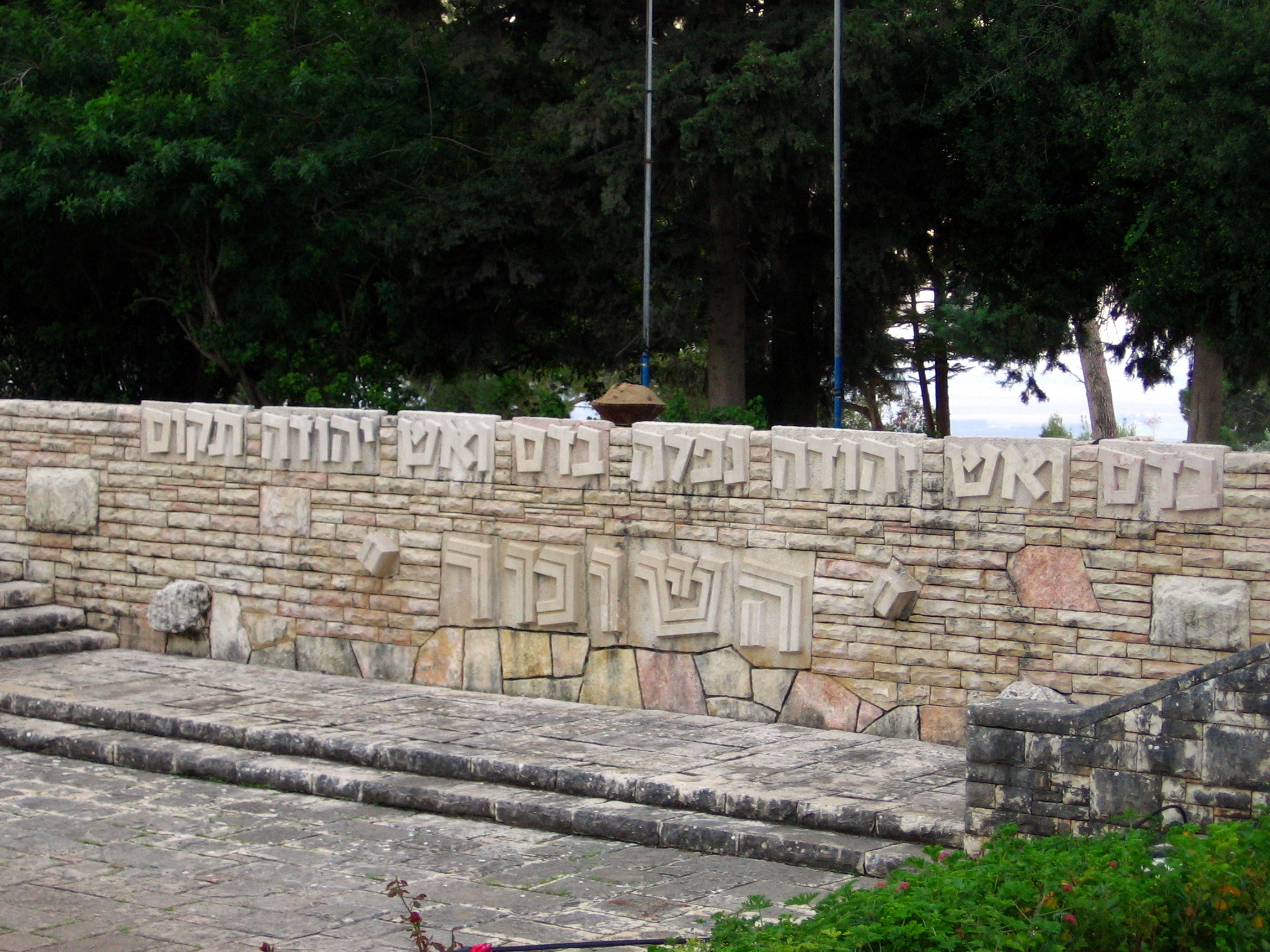
Hashomer memorial at Tel Hai

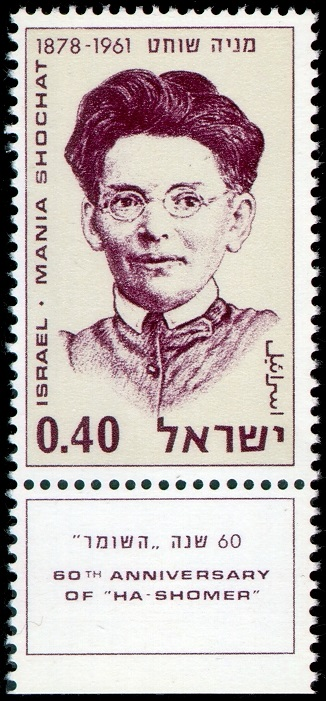
Manya Shochat on a stamp issued on Hashomer's 60th anniversary, 1970

== See also ==
- Jewish Supernumerary Police
- Jewish Settlement Police
