= Operation Velvetta =

1948 Israeli Air Force logistics operation

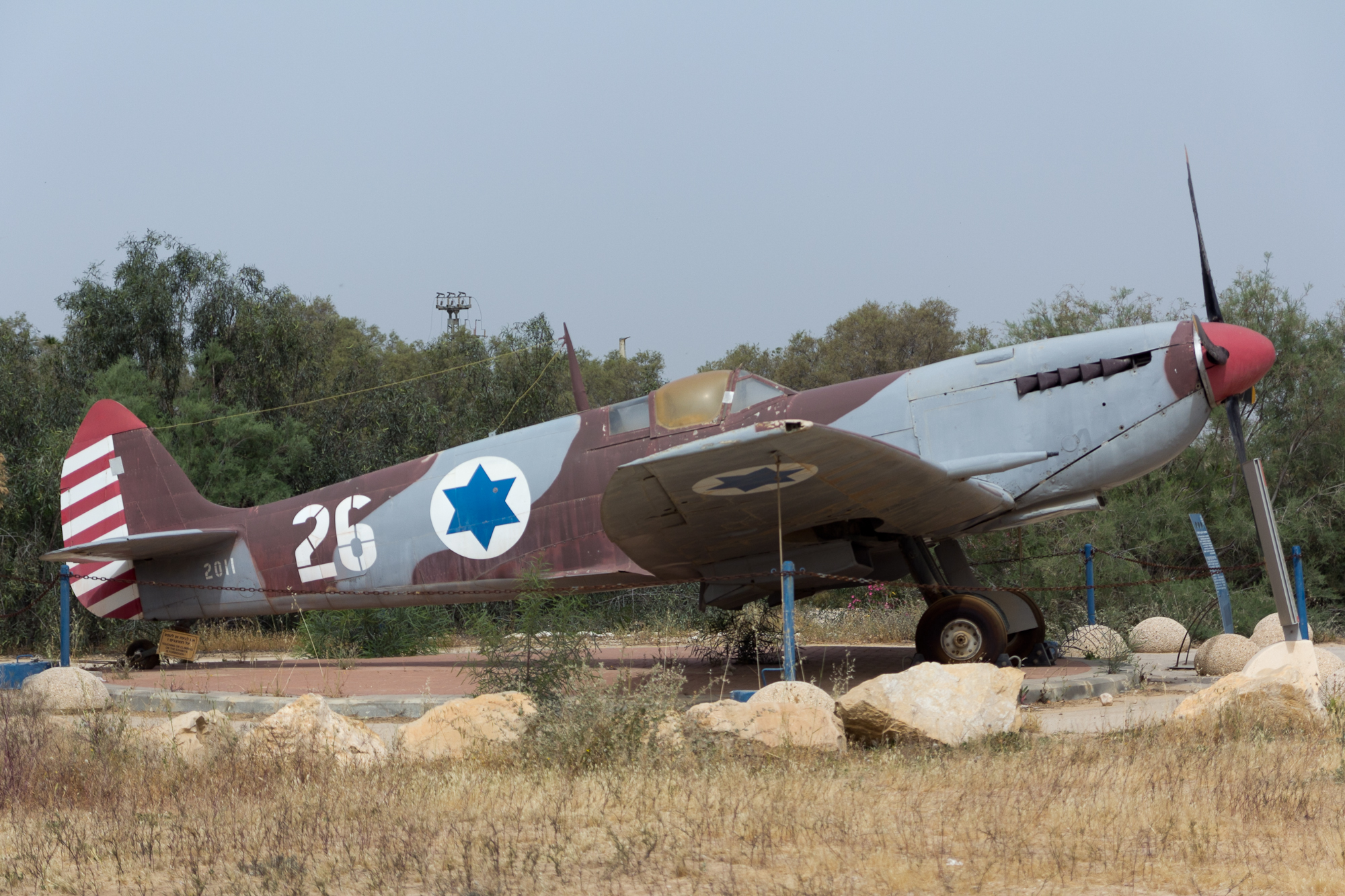
Supermarine Spitfire purchased by Israel from Czechoslovakia at the Israeli Air Force Museum.

Operation Velvetta (Hebrew: ולווטה; also known as Operation Alabama) was a 1948 Israeli Air Force operation to ferry Supermarine Spitfires purchased in Czechoslovakia to Israel.

The fighter planes were purchased from Czechoslovakia at $23,000 per plane. Arrangements were also made with the Yugoslavian leader Josip Broz Tito to use the Kapino Polje Airport in the city of Nikšić (an abandoned Luftwaffe airbase) as a waystation for 60 purchased Spitfires (codenamed "Yoram"). The commander of the Israelis at Nikšić airfield was Gideon (Geda) Shochat, son of Manya and Israel Shochat, and a former RAF officer. The first of the two legs of the journey was from Kunovice, Czechoslovakia to Nikšić (codenamed "Alabama"). The second leg was more difficult, crossing 2,250 km of open water from Nikšić to Israel.

== Secrecy ==
This operation was of high secrecy, as it was opposed by both Britain and the USSR. To preserve secrecy, the Israelis were not allowed to talk with Yugoslavian soldiers or citizens. They were given permission to use the base at Nikšić and repaint their aircraft markings with Yugoslav roundels for the flight to Israel so that the shipment would not arouse any suspicions. After landing in Israel, the roundels were removed to uncover hidden Israeli roundels.

== Velvetta 1 ==
=== From Czechoslovakia to Yugoslavia ===
The first leg of the journey took place on September 24. This section, which took an hour and a half, went well for the most part. Pilot Tuxie Blau's landing gear failed to deploy, and although he was fine, the aircraft was severely damaged.

=== From Yugoslavia to Israel ===
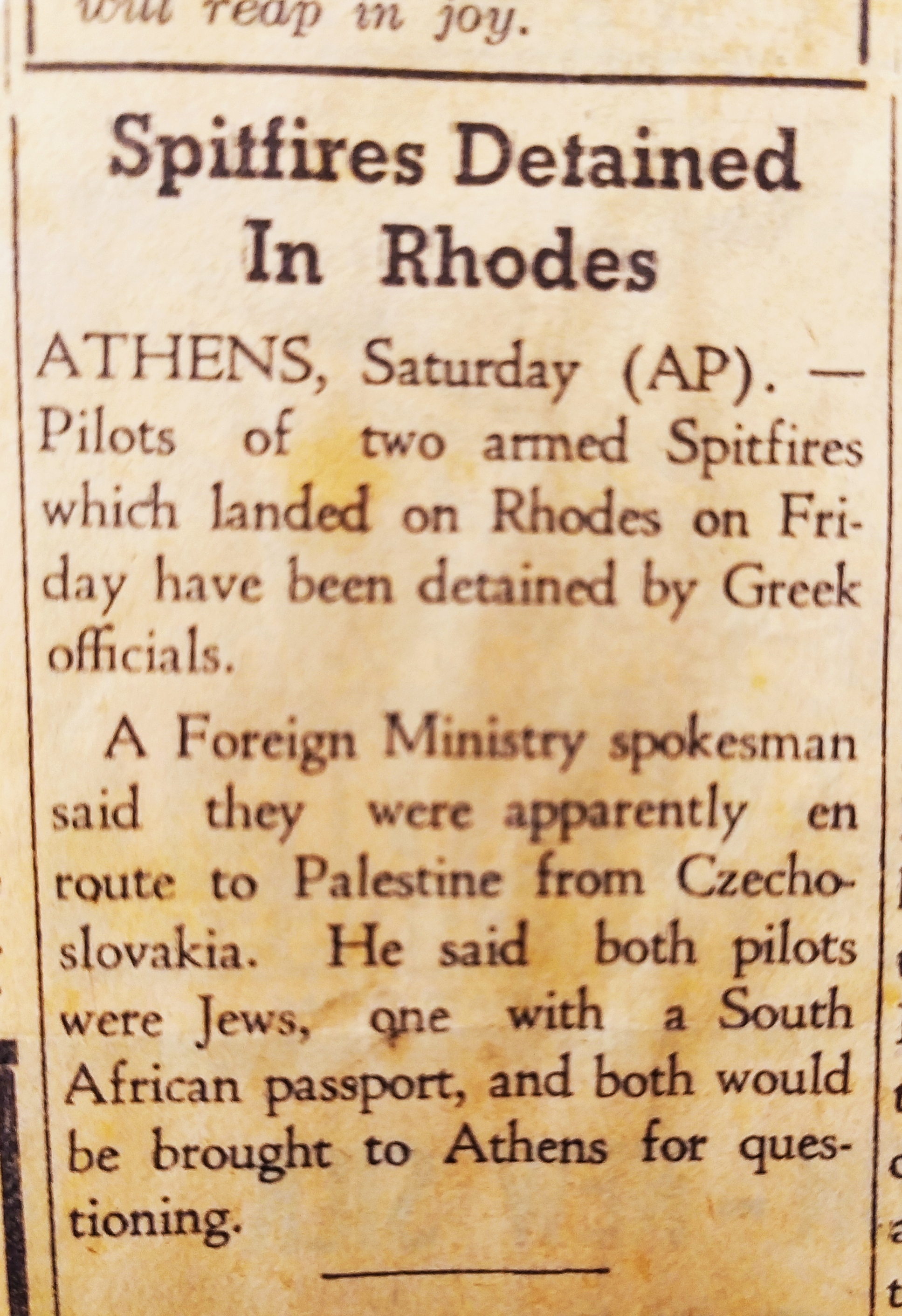
Article on the emergency landing of the two Spitfires in Rhodes in Velvetta 1

The second part of the mission was much more difficult. This was a non-stop, six-and-three-quarter-hour flight over 2,500 miles of open water - possibly the longest Spitfire flight ever. Sam Pomerance, the mechanic-in-chief in Czechoslovakia, suggested that to make the planes as light and efficient as possible, they should be fitted with extra fuel tanks and that nonessentials, such as radios and guns, should be removed. Walkie-talkies were used to talk during the flight. If forced to land in Albania or Greece on the way to Israel, the pilots decided to say that they were flying to Israel.

The mission was successful and helped support the Israelis during the 1947–1949 Palestine war. On September 27, 5 planes left for Israel. Pilots Modi Alon and Boris Senior ran out of fuel and had to make an emergency landing in Rhodes. They were arrested and interrogated, but did not reveal the flight path. On October 3, Israel sent an envoy to Greece and they were returned. The rest of the Spitfires successfully landed in Ramat David.

== Velvetta 2 ==
Pomerance returned to Czechoslovakia and made 15 more flights to Israel, dividing the pilots into two formations. The planes left on December 15 and yet again on the December 18, but both times were forced to return due to rain and other poor weather conditions.

Bill and Sam Pomerance were lost in flight, and it was later found out that Bill made an emergency landing 160 miles north of the Yoram airfield and Sam was killed when his plane crashed into the mountains.

On December 19, 12 more Spitfires were flown to Israel. One plane was disabled due to technical issues. On December 22, the first formation of 5 planes flew to Israel; one plane turned back due to an engine failure. On December 26, the second 6-plane formation successfully arrived in Israel. A Skymaster was sent to Czechoslovakia to retrieve the guns and other parts that had been stripped from the aircraft.

== Members ==
The following is a list of people known to have participated in the operation:

- Modi Alon
- Rudy Augarten
- Tuxie Blau
- Jack Cohen
- Syd Cohen
- George Lichter
- Dani Shapira
- Bob Dawn
- Jack Doyle
- Aaron (Red) Finkel
- Sandy Jacobs
- Mordechai Hod
- John McElroy
- Leo Nomis
- William (Bill) Pomerantz
- Sam Pomerance
- Bill Schroeder
- Boris Senior
- Gideon (Geda) Shochat
- Lee Sinclair
- Ted Stern
- Karel Vítek

== See also ==
- Arms shipments from Czechoslovakia to Israel 1947–49
