= Eliahu Krause =

Jewish agronomist and activist

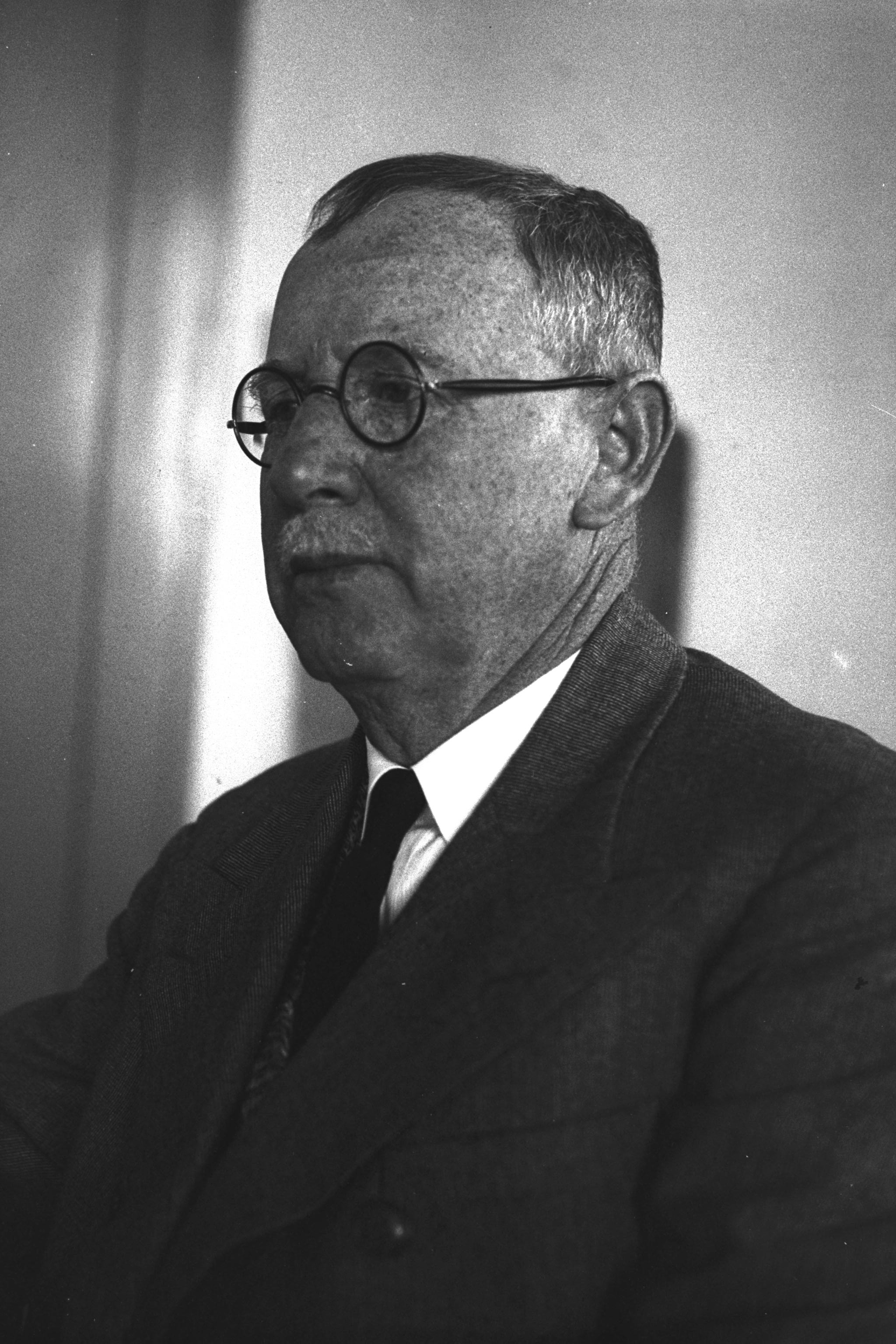
Eliyahu Krause in 1936

Eliyahu Krause (Hebrew: אליהו קראוזה; 1876–1962) was a Jewish agronomist and activist.

== Biography ==
Krause migrated from Russia to what was then Palestine in 1892. He was employed by the Jewish Colonization Association (JCA), creating an agricultural school near İzmir, Turkey. In 1915, he became the Mikveh Israel Agricultural School's director, holding that position until 1954.

=== Sejera ===
At Krause's farm belonging to the JCA, haverim worked under his direction, at a yearly deficit. Manya Shochat managed to establish a collective at Sejera (or Sedjera) thanks to Krause's permission, under the assumption they would revert such a situation. Under this arrangement, the farm's first 3 women workers were admitted. Under the terms of the agreement, Krause would turn over to Shochat the field and dairy work, while the owners gave the lessees the livestock, inventory and seed; in return they would turn over a fifth of the harvest to him. The purpose of the farm was to train Jewish farmers in self-sufficiency.

It was during the collective that workers would receive agricultural lessons from Eliyahu Krause, socialism instruction from Manya Shochat, and Hebrew classes from David Ben-Gurion, who lived close by. The collective disbanded after a year.

== See also ==
- Hashomer
