= Mendel Portugali =

Founder of Hashomer

Mendel Portugali (1888 – 13 January 1917) was one of the leading figures in the Second Aliyah and the Zionist settlement of Palestine. He was one of the founders of the armed group Hashomer.

== Biography ==
Mendel Portugali was born in 1888 in Călărași (Kalarash), Bessarabia, Russian Empire (now a part of Moldova).

As a boy, he studied in a cheder. In 1899, he attended a school of commerce in Chișinău (Kishinev). Although a good student, he was expelled two years later for his ties with a revolutionary group. On his return home, Mendel decided he wanted to be a tradesman, but his parents were bitterly opposed to the idea, which they considered beneath the family's dignity.

He spent his time trying to get the Moldovans to rise up against what he perceived to be an oppressive regime, but they refused to see him as anything but yet another Jewish revolutionary inciting them against the Tsar. They beat and then arrested him. His house was searched, seditious literature was found and Mendel was sentenced to three years of hard labour in Siberia. He served two of them, before being issued a pardon on the occasion of the birth of Nicholas II's heir, Tsarevich Aleksei.

Mendel joined Poale Zion, worked as a math teacher and learnt farming from his Moldavian neighbours.

When the pogrom of 1905 broke out, Mendel and Israel Giladi were involved in defending the Jewish community of Călărași. During the fighting, he was wounded in the back. Mendel and his brother had to escape across the border, because the police had a warrant for their arrest.

He made his way to Palestine, his family joining him later. He married Tova Eylovich and had three sons, one of whom died in infancy.

Mendel was one of the founders of "Bar-Giora" and Hashomer. He exerted a restraining influence on some of the rasher members. In Sejera, bad-blood broke out between the members of the collective and one of the managers, who had replaced the Jewish labourers with fellahen. Several of the workers and watchmen wanted to beat up the manager for that. Mendel prevented them, suggesting that going on strike was a better option all round.

He served as one of the three Hashomer chairmen. As such, he was busy recruiting new members and also hiring temporary watchmen during harvests. Although associated with guarding for most of his life, Mendel felt a closer affinity with working the land.

In 1917, whilst on duty, he was tossing his gun in the air, which went off, fatally wounding him. He lingered on for a few days in great agony but without complaint, before dying on 13 January 1917. He is buried alongside his wife, Tova, in the Kfar Giladi cemetery.

== Sources ==
- "Anshei Hashomer Bechayeihem Ubemotam" (Hashomer members in life and death) Gershon Gera.
