= Geda =

Geda may refer to:

- Curt Geda (born 1968), American television animator, director and producer
- Fabio Geda (born 1972), Italian novelist
- Sigitas Geda (1943–2008), Lithuanian author
- GEDA software tools
- Geda Shochat, Royal Air force and Israeli pilot
