= Israel Shochat =

Israeli politician (1886–1961)

- ישראל שוחט
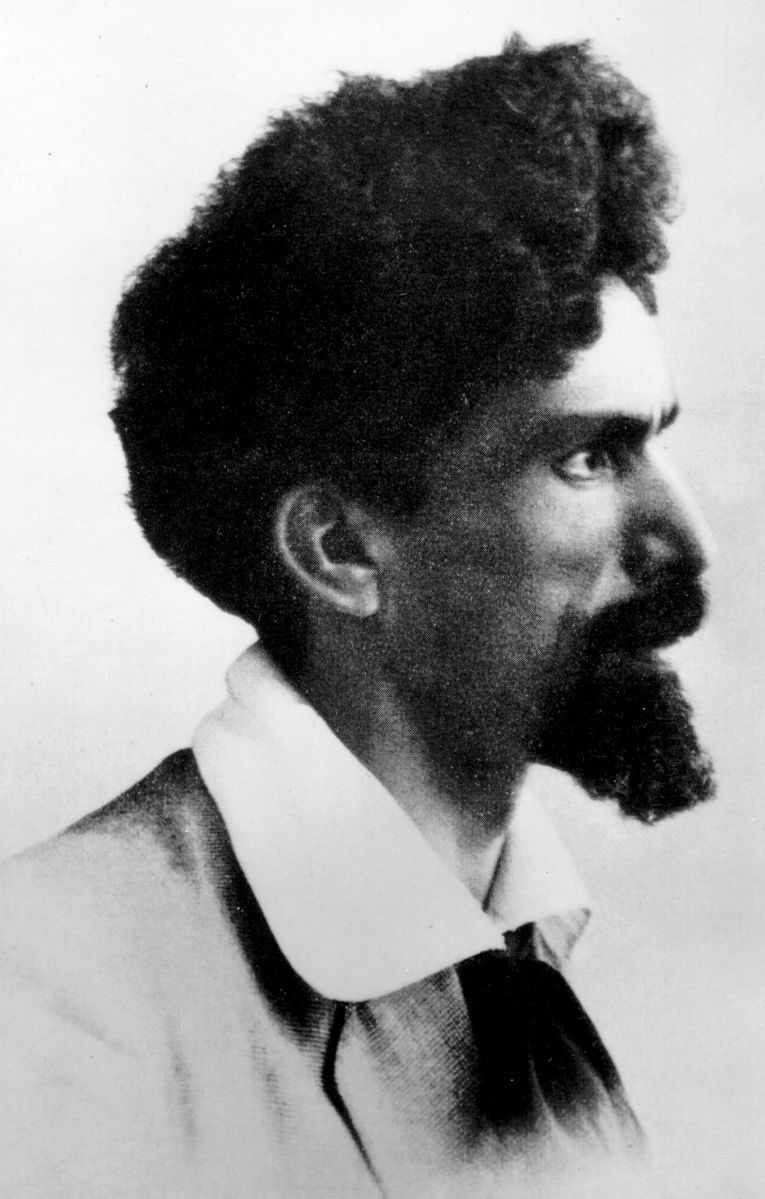
- Born: January 30, 1886; Lyskovo, Grodno Governorate, Russian Empire
- Died: July 7, 1962 (aged 75); Tel Aviv, Israel
- Spouse: Manya, née Wilbushewitz
- Children: Gideon (Geda); Ana

Israel Shochat (Hebrew: ישראל שוחט; 1886–1962) was a founder of and a key figure in Bar-Giora and Hashomer, two of the precursors of the Israel Defense Forces.

== Biography ==
=== Russia and Germany ===
Israel Shochat was born in 1886 in Lyskovo, in the Grodno Governorate of the Russian Empire (present-day Belarus, a few km west of Ruzhany). As a child, he had tutors for Hebrew and Russian. He was a founder member of Poale Zion in Grodno and set up a Jewish self-defence league in 1903 after the Kishinev pogrom. He went to Germany to study agronomy but left his studies after only three months and left for Palestine.

=== Palestine ===
In 1904 Israel Shochat and his brother, Eliezer Shochat, immigrated to Ottoman Syria (later Palestine). They worked as field hands in the fields and orchards of Petah Tikva. He moved to Rishon LeZion to work in the winery. He was greatly influenced by Michael Halperin, a Jewish visionary who wanted to create a tribe of Jewish Bedouin and a Hebrew army. While at Rishon LeZion he met Alexander Zaïd and shared with him his radical socialist ideas. Zaid received them enthusiastically and declared "I'm with you, for life or death, let's start as of now!" In Rishon LeZion, he suffered the first bout of malaria, which was to plague him for the remainder of his life.

Israel Shochat moved to Jerusalem to persuade the yeshivot leaders to join the efforts to create a national workforce. His attempts failed. To support himself, he shined shoes at Jaffa Gate. As a result of asthma, he was forced to give up manual labour and worked as Israel Belkind's assistant. He became interested in the Circassians living in Palestine, as an example of how a small minority could preserve its identity and pride in an often hostile environment. The key for Shochat was that they cultivated their land and protected it with their own hands.

Shochat was a natural conspirator and by 1906 he had formed an underground group with about 25 followers mostly based in Lower Galilee. He used to inspect new arrivals coming off the boats at Jaffa looking for new recruits. It was there he spotted 20-year-old David Ben Gurion who he invited to attend the founding conference of the local branch of Poale Zion – "Jewish Social-Democratic Workers' Party in the Land of Israel" – in October 1906. Also attending the conference was the only other Marxist group based in Jaffa, the Rostovians, a group of 30 young men from Rostov dedicated to creating a single Arab-Jewish proletariat.

Using his followers Shochat engineered the election of Ben Gurion as chairman who created an impression by insisting that proceedings be held in Hebrew. For practical reasons discussions were in Russian and Yiddish. Shochat also rigged the secret ballot so that both he and Ben Gurion were members of the 10 man committee who were delegated the responsibility of writing their manifesto. The resulting Ramleh Program was accepted by a second 15 delegate meeting held the following January.

The program, in Hebrew, bore many similarities to the Communist Manifesto but included: "the party aspires to political independence of the Jewish People in this country." It also dictated that all party activities should be conducted in Hebrew and that there should be segregation of the Jewish and Arab economies. i.e. Jewish enterprises should not employ Arabs. Shochat and Ben Gurion continued to work closely together for a short time before Ben Gurion returned to his life as a pioneer. At that time he was less militant than Shochat and in particular he was not comfortable with reports of Shochat's gunmen expropriating funds in Jerusalem.

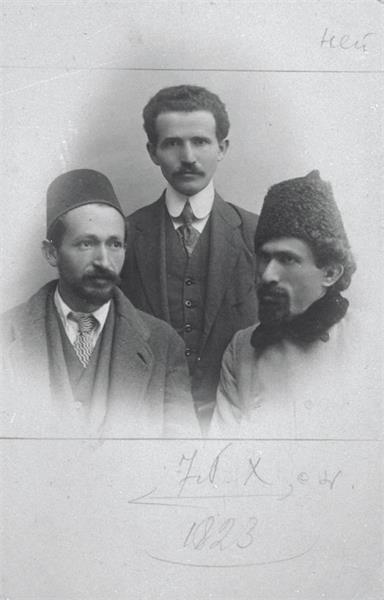
Ben Zvi, Ben Gurion and Shochat

The arrival of Yitzhak Ben-Zvi in April 1907 changed everything. A fresh conference was held in May at which Ben-Zvi and a Rostovian were elected as the Central Committee; all of Ben Gurion's policies – Hebrew over Yiddish, segregation of Jewish and Arab economies – were overturned; Shochat and Ben-Zvi were selected as delegates to the World Zionist Congress held that year in The Hague.

On their return they established Bar-Giora – a secret paramilitary organisation committed to armed struggle. The initial group of nine met on 27 September 1907 in Ben Zvi's room in Jaffa. They swore themselves to secrecy – on pain of death – and pledged absolute allegiance to their leader Israel Shochat. Their motto was "Judea fell in blood and fire, Judea shall rise again in blood and fire". Shochat's vision was to create Hebrew military force which could lead an armed uprising and create a Jewish state. The inner circle of nine were to create subordinate organisations which could be manipulated towards the ultimate goal. Two areas were to be developed: security guards for the existing settlements and shepherds to conduct detailed surveys of the land. They would set up new border settlements modelled on the Circassian villages, with residents combining army training and farming.

In May 1908 he married Manya Wilbushewitch and in September they led his group, now 20 strong, to Sejera where they took over the running of the training farm. Their first action was to engineer the sacking of the Circassian night watchman. This led to several months of night time gunfire aimed at the farm and Moshav. Bar Giora organised night-time security and the arming of the farm workers. The following summer at a secret meeting at Kfar Tavor Bar Giora reinvented itself as Hashomer with the prime objective of providing security for, as well as establishing, remote colonies. Shochat remained absolute leader. Hashomer never had more than a hundred members. Its launch coincided with the collapse of the Second Aliyah with more Jews leaving than arriving. Convinced that the future road to an independent Jewish state lay through the Young Turk revolution, and what he understood to be the promise of autonomous community status, Israel and Manya moved to Istanbul where Shochat enrolled in the university to study law. During the 1913 Balkan War he approached the Ottoman leadership offering to raise a Jewish cavalry unit, claiming to already have fifty volunteers. The war ended before his plans could be acted on.

==== Politics and Jewish self-defence ====
Along with Israel Giladi, Alexander Zaid and Mendel Portugali, he convinced some of the Jewish farmers to let them help with guarding the fields. It was a modest start.

Israel represented Poalei Zion in the Zionist Congress of 1907, which took place in The Hague in the Netherlands. He was his party's first representative from Palestine. He was unable to present his idea to the assembly and in a private conversation, Menachem Ussishkin told Israel that he was much too young to succeed in achieving the goal of a national defence. Yitzhak Ben-Zvi, a representative from Ukraine, was receptive and they travelled back to Palestine together, working along the way.

==== Paramilitary organisations ====
In 1907, Israel Shochat was one of the 10 people who, in Yitzhak Ben-Zvi's Jaffa apartment, founded Bar-Giora, a clandestine organisation which sought to create an armed Jewish force. It took its name from one of the leading Jewish rebels of the First Jewish–Roman War. Manya Wilbuszewicz, the leader and founding member of the collective at Sejera, convinced Shochat to join the agricultural settlement there. He accepted, becoming the second leader of the community which he used as a base for training Jewish guards. In May 1908, Israel and Manya got married. The next year, Israel and Manya Shochat were among the leading founders of Hashomer (lit. The Watchman), a more ambitious enterprise than Bar-Giora, being the first attempt to provide an organised defence for all the Jewish communities in Palestine.

==== World War I: deportation ====
In 1914 the Ottoman Empire entered World War I. The Turkish authorities viewed the Jews of Palestine with a great degree of distrust, particularly Russian nationals like the Shochats; after the Shochats were found hiding weapons for the Hashomer organisation, they were deported to the Anatolian city of Bursa, in Turkey. While their first-born son, Gideon ("Geda"), had been born in Palestine during their first years of marriage, their daughter Anna was born in Anatolia in 1916.

==== Politics, Work Battalion and Haganah ====
The Shochat family returned to Palestine around Passover, 1919, after attending the Poalei Tziyon convention in Stockholm. They both joined the Ahdut HaAvoda, a workers' party led by David Ben-Gurion. At first Israel Shochat worked the land in Kfar Giladi, but soon became involved in founding the famous Work Battalion and in organizing the defence of the Galilee. In 1920 the Ahdut HaAvoda decided to replace the existing Hashomer militias with a new organisation, the Haganah, established as the paramilitary arm of the Histadrut. During the riots of 1921, Israel Shochat took an active part in defending Tel Aviv and Jaffa. The same year his wife left for the United States on mission to collect money for the Histadrut and, rather on her own initiative, for the Haganah. Due to political opposition within the Jewish community, she only managed to raise several thousand dollars, which she sent to Israel Shochat who was waiting in Vienna, where he oversaw the purchase and shipment of weapons to the now British-administered Palestine.

In the years 1921–26, Israel Shochat was on the Jewish National Council. He was also instrumental in forming Hapoel. In the 1930s, after a long conflict with the Histadrut, he retired from political life.

=== State of Israel ===
==== Death ====
Israel Shochat died in 1962 and is buried in Kfar Giladi alongside his wife.

== Family ==
Israel and Maya had a son and a daughter together.
