= Kfar Tavor =

Town in northern Israel

Kfar Tavor: כְּפַר תָּבוֹר; كفر تافور
- Local council (from 1949)
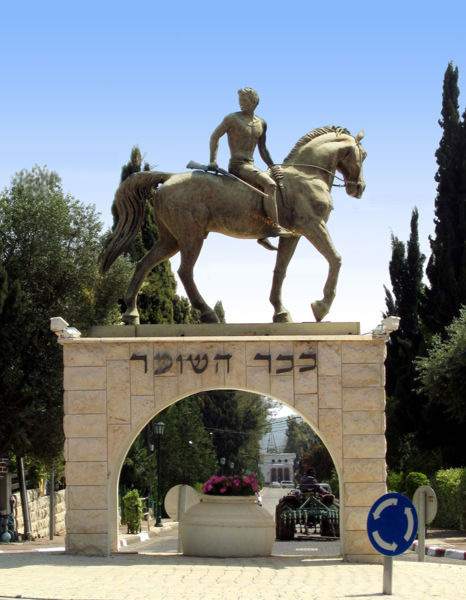
- Watchmen's Square in Kfar Tavor, sculptor: Asaf Lifshitz

- Location within Northeast Israel Location within Israel
- Coordinates: 32°41′13″N 35°25′15″E
- Grid position: 189/232 PAL
- Country: Israel
- District: Northern
- Subdistrict: Kinneret
- Natural Region: Eastern Lower Galilee
- Founded: 1901

Government
  - Head of Municipality: Oded Halperin

Area
  - Total: 1,231 dunams (1.231 km^{2}; 0.475 sq mi)

Population (2024)
  - Total: 4,276
  - Density: 3,474/km^{2} (8,997/sq mi)

Kfar Tavor (Hebrew: כְּפַר תָּבוֹר, Arabic: كفر تافور) is a village in the Lower Galilee region of Northern Israel, at the foot of Mount Tabor. Founded in 1901, it was awarded local council status in 1949. In 2024 it had a population of 4,276. As of 2022, nearly all of its citizens are Jewish.

== History ==
Ceramics from the Byzantine era have been found here.

In the early 9th century, under Abbasid rule, Abu Salih Khayr al-Khadim, a eunuch of Caliph al-Mu’tazz b’illah, left all his property in Kfar Tavor (then called Kafr Tabaria) and another Galilee village, Kafr Kanna, to a waqf (religious endowment). The endowments were supposed to be eternal, but were presumably ended by the conquest of the Crusaders in 1099.

=== Ottoman period ===
==== Arab village ====
In the Ottoman era there was a village here called Mes'ha. In 1596 the village appeared under the name of "Masha" in the tax registers as part of the nahiya (subdistrict) of Tabariyya in the Sanjak (district) of Safad. It was noted as "hali" (=empty), but a fixed tax-rate of 25% on agricultural product was paid. These products included wheat, barley and cotton; the taxes totalled 3,300 akçe. In 1799 it appeared as Mechi on the map Pierre Jacotin compiled that year.

In 1881, the Palestine Exploration Fund's Survey of Western Palestine described "Meshah" village with a population of 100 Muslims, with houses chiefly of basalt stone, and a few of adobe and stone. The village was situated on an arable plain, without trees. The water supply was from a cistern in the village.

==== Jewish village ====
Kfar Tavor was established in 1901 by pioneers of the First Aliya under the auspices of the Jewish Colonization Association. Twenty-eight farmers settled in the area with the assistance of the philanthropist Baron Edmond de Rothschild. The new settlement was originally known as Mes'ha, the name of the nearby Arab village. It was renamed in 1903 at the urging of Zionist leader Menachem Ussishkin who visited the site and was surprised to find it had no Hebrew name. At first, there was some debate over whether to use the term kfar ("village"), which some residents thought would bode badly for future growth. Ussishkin responded that he had visited the German town of Düsseldorf, which had also originated as a Dorf, or village, but was now a full-fledged city. The Rothschild administration determined that the site was ideal for cultivating grapes. The vineyards of Kfar Tavor became a supplier of grapes to the country's wineries.

On 12 April 1909 a group of Bar Giora members left Sejera, where they had been based, and met in secret at Kfar Tavor. Led by Israel Shochat and Yitzhak Ben-Zvi it was decided to establish an armed militia - Hashomer. Its members were to act as guards for Jewish colonies and work as laboured towards establishing further colonies.

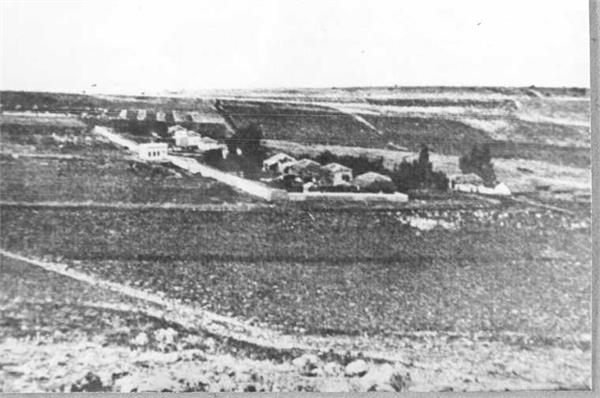
Kfar Tavor 1908

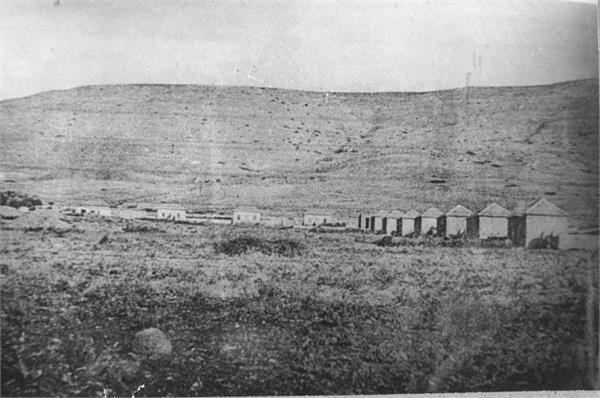
Kfar Tavor 1909

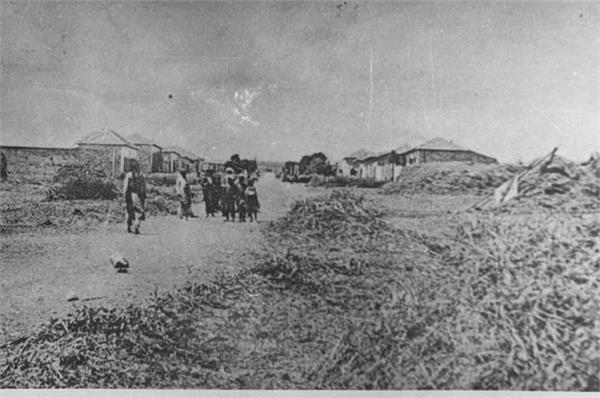
Kfar Tavor 1910

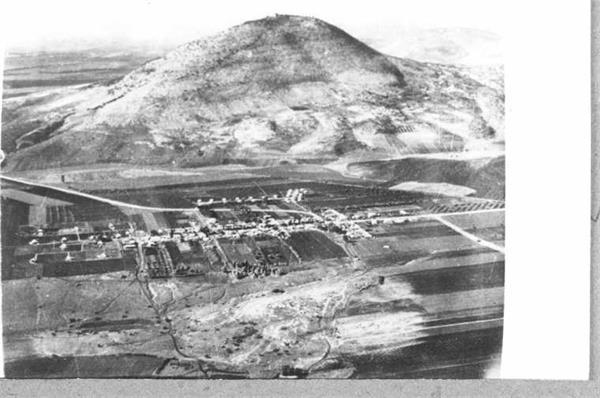
Kfar Tavor 1920

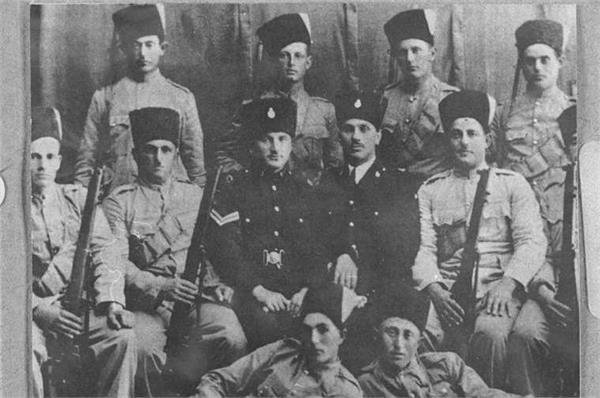
Kfar Tavor guards 1938

=== British Mandate era ===
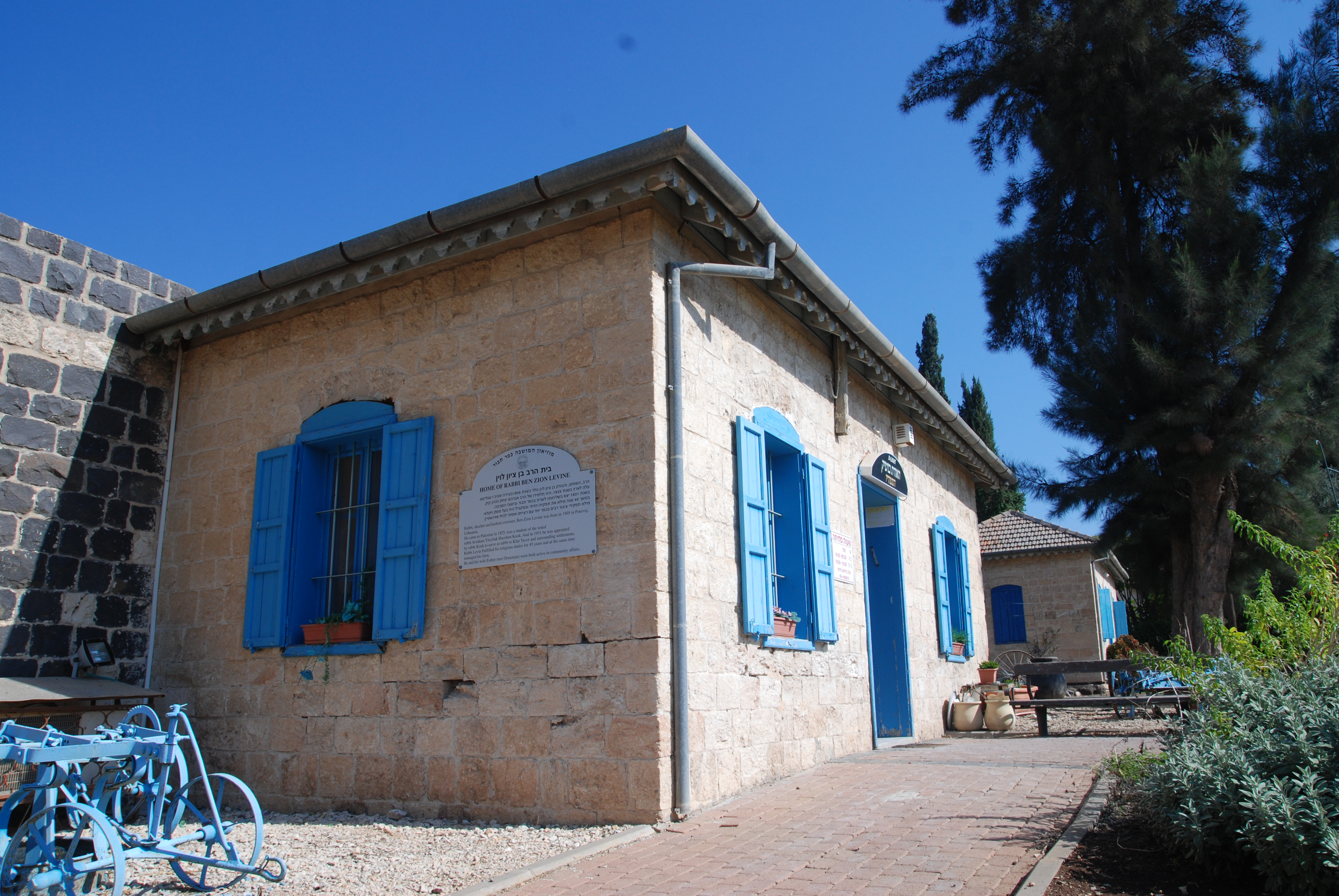
Kfar Tavor History Museum

In the 1922 census of Palestine conducted by the British Mandate authorities, Mesha (Kufr Tabur) had a population of 274; all Jews. The 1931 census of Palestine recorded 328 persons in Mas-ha living in 54 houses: 304 Jews, 20 Muslims and 4 Christians.

In the 1945 statistics Kfar Tavor had 230 inhabitants, all Jews. Mas-ha was noted as an alternative name.

== Demographics ==
Historical population
Year	Pop.	±%
1972	200	—
1983	600	+200.0%
1995	1,200	+100.0%
2008	2,500	+108.3%
2022	4,363	+74.5%
2024	4,275	−2.0%

In 2022, 97.9% of the population was Jewish and 2.1% was counted as other.

== Landmarks ==
In the Hameyasdim neighborhood, the core of the village, there is a museum and other sites, including the HaShomer house, the first school and teacher's house (now a library) and a synagogue that was built in 1937. Another school, built in 1911, now serves as the Shenkar Tzfira Music Center. The main street of the neighborhood has houses left from the village's early days, as well as parts of the wall that surrounded it.

== Voting Patterns ==
In the 2022 election, 63 percent of voters in Kfar Tavor voted for the parties of the center-left coalition led by Yair Lapid, while 32 percent voted for the parties of the right-wing coalition led by Benjamin Netanyahu and 0.7 percent voted for the Arab parties.

In the 2026 election, 65 percent of voters in Kfar Tavor voted for the parties of the center-left coalition led by Gadi Eisenkot, while 26 percent voted for the parties of the right-wing coalition led by Benjamin Netanyahu and 1 percent voted for the Arab parties. An additional 5 percent voted for the Reservists, and 2.9 percent voted for Amcha Yisrael. Voter turnout increased 14 percent from the 2022 election.

== Notable residents ==
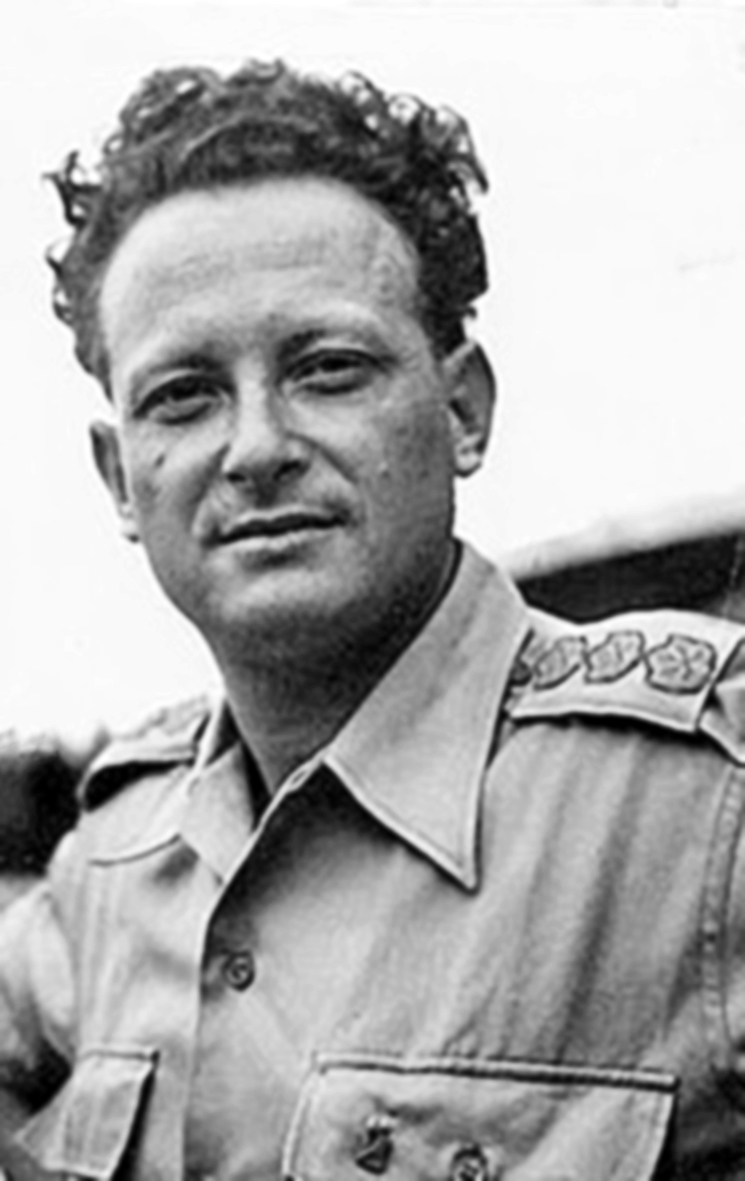
Major General Yigal Allon (1948–49)

- Yigal Allon (1918–80), politician, commander of the Palmach, and general in the IDF, was born in Kfar Tavor.
- Micha Goldman (born 1948), politician, was born in Kfar Tavor
- Oz Blayzer (born 1992), basketball player
- Itay Segev (born 1995), basketball player
- Moshe Klimantovski (1900-1920), farmer and murder victim

== Bibliography ==
- Barron, J.B., ed. (1923). Palestine: Report and General Abstracts of the Census of 1922. Government of Palestine.
- Conder, C.R.; Kitchener, H.H. (1881). The Survey of Western Palestine: Memoirs of the Topography, Orography, Hydrography, and Archaeology. Vol. 1. London: Committee of the Palestine Exploration Fund.
- Dauphin, C. (1998). La Palestine byzantine, Peuplement et Populations. BAR International Series 726 (in French). Vol. III : Catalogue. Oxford: Archeopress. ISBN 0-860549-05-4.
- Department of Statistics (1945). Village Statistics, April, 1945. Government of Palestine.
- Karmon, Y. (1960). "An Analysis of Jacotin's Map of Palestine" (PDF). Israel Exploration Journal. 10 (3, 4): 155–173, 244–253. Archived from the original (PDF) on 2019-12-22.
- Hadawi, S. (1970). Village Statistics of 1945: A Classification of Land and Area ownership in Palestine. Palestine Liberation Organization Research Centre. Archived from the original on 2018-12-08.
- Hütteroth, W.-D.; Abdulfattah, K. (1977). Historical Geography of Palestine, Transjordan and Southern Syria in the Late 16th Century. Erlanger Geographische Arbeiten, Sonderband 5. Erlangen, Germany: Vorstand der Fränkischen Geographischen Gesellschaft. ISBN 3-920405-41-2.
- Palmer, E.H. (1881). The Survey of Western Palestine: Arabic and English Name Lists Collected During the Survey by Lieutenants Conder and Kitchener, R. E. Transliterated and Explained by E.H. Palmer. Committee of the Palestine Exploration Fund.
