= Manya Shochat =

Israeli politician (1879–1961)

- מניה שוחט
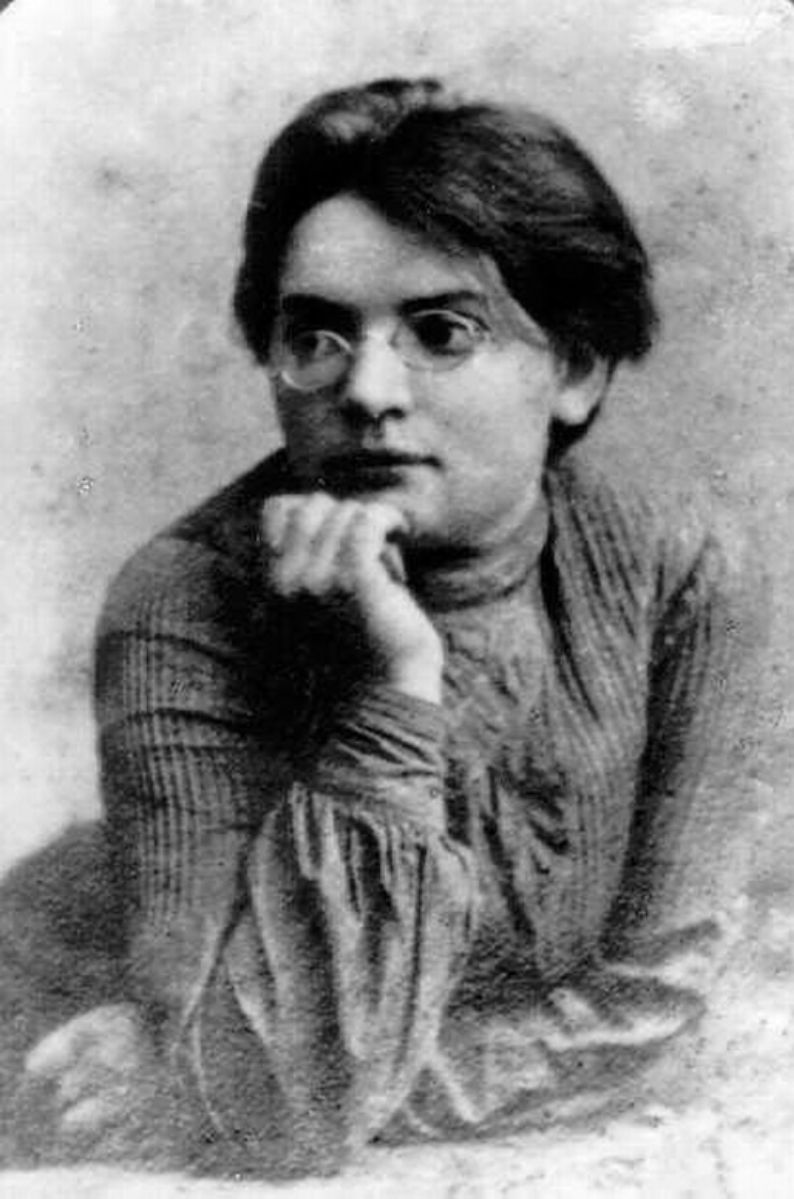
- Born: 1880; Grodno Governorate, Russian Empire
- Died: 1961 (aged 80–81); Tel Aviv, Israel

Manya Shochat (Hebrew: מניה שוחט; also Mania, Wilbuszewicz/Wilbushewitz; later Shochat; 1880–1961) was a Russian-Jewish politician who was a leading figure in the Zionist movement. She was influential in the establishment of kibbutzim in Palestine in the early 1900s, which laid the groundwork for the establishment of the State of Israel in 1948.

== Biography ==
Manya Wilbushewitch was born in the Grodno Governorate of the Russian Empire (present-day Belarus) to wealthy Jewish parents and grew up on the family estate near Łosośna. She was a descendant of Comte Vibois, an officer in Napoleon's army who converted to Judaism after marrying a Jewish woman. One of her brothers, Isaac, studied agriculture in Russia. He was expelled for slapping a professor who, in the course of a lecture, stated that the Jews were sucking the blood of the farmers in Ukraine. In late 1882, he left for Palestine and joined the Bilu movement. His letters home were a powerful influence on young Manya. Another one of her brothers, an engineer named Gedaliah, also went to Palestine in 1892 and helped fund his younger siblings' education.

As a young adult, Manya went to work in her brother's factory in Minsk to learn about working class conditions. In 1899, she was imprisoned and underwent lengthy interrogations about her contacts with Bund revolutionaries. Whilst in prison she fell in love with Sergey Zubatov, agent provocateur and head of the Tsarist Secret Police in Moscow. Zubatov conceived a plan that matched Manya's ideological notions, through which workers would form "tame" organizations that would work for reform rather than for overthrow of the government. She was persuaded that this would also help achieve rights for Jews.

In 1901 Manya found the Jewish Independent Labor Party. The party was successful in leading strikes because the secret police supported it, but was loathed by the Bund and other Jewish socialist groups. The party collapsed and its members rounded up in 1903 following the Kishinev pogrom. Experiencing, as she put it, 'severe emotional distress' following the failure of her political organization and arrest of her friends she contemplated suicide. According to Shabtai Teveth she killed a door-to-door salesman who called at her hideout in Odessa thinking he was a member of the secret police. She dismembered the body and sent the remains to four different locations of the Russian Empire. She accepted an invitation from her brother Nachum, who was the founder of the Shemen soap factory in Haifa, to accompany him on a research expedition to some of the wilder places of Palestine. She arrived on January 2, 1904.

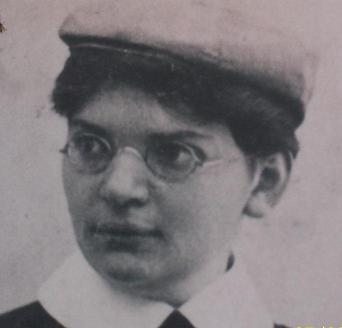
Manya Shochat, at the seventh Zionist Congress, Basel, 1907

"I couldn't see what direction I should take in my life. I agreed to join my brother's expedition, because, in fact, I was indifferent to everything. For me it was just another adventure."

"The Hauran remained without a redeemer - and my soul cleaved unto this place."

Manya fell in love with the beauty of the land and was especially touched by the plight of the Jewish settlement in the Hauran. Baron Edmond de Rothschild had bought land in the area, but the Ottoman government stipulated that no Jews be allowed to settle there. A small group that had disregarded the decision was evicted, so the Baron resorted to leasing out the plots of land to Arab Fellahin. Manya decided to visit all of the Baron's colonies and see for herself why they were in financial straits. She became acquainted with and was greatly impressed by Yehoshua and Olga Hankin. Her decision to stay was due in a large part to their influence.

=== Family ===
Manya came from a wealthy non-religious Jewish family. Her father, Ze’ev Wilbuschewitz, owned a flour factory in Grodno, then part of the Russian Empire. He sent all of his five sons to study engineering at universities across Europe; Berlin, Zurich and Petersburg. Four of the brothers eventually migrated to Palestine. The first, Isaac, arrived in 1884, as part of the Bilu’im movement, but he died soon after of Yellow Fever. Next was Gedaliah, (1865-1932), who first arrived in 1892. He was a partner in setting up a metal work factory but left 3 years later. Returning in 1912 he was structural engineer for the first Technion building as well as the Reali Secondary School in Haifa. When Turkey joined the war Gedaliah became chief engineer for the army Headquarters in Damascus. The rest of his career was spent on major engineering works around Haifa; Nesher cement works, Haifa’s first electricity buildings, and the Shemen factory. The Shemen edible oil factory, established in 1924, producing soap and olive-oil, was managed by a third brother, Nahum, (1879-1971), who had previously, in 1905, set up an edible oil factory near Lydda, followed, in 1910, by the Atid edible oil factory in Haifa. In 1917 he was conscripted into the Turkish army and joined Gedaliah in Damascus. After the war he founded Shemen and was its Managing Director until he retired. The last brother, Moshe, (1869-1952), arrived in 1919, aged 50, he took part in the building of the Nesher factory, as well as the founding and management of Shemen. Manya also had an older sister who suffered from depression.

In May 1908, Manya married Israel Shochat, who was 9 years younger than her. She had 2 children with him: Gideon (Geda), 1912, and Anna, 1917.

By 1921 Manya and Israel were no longer living together. Despite Israel's relationships with other women they continued their political activities together and Manya repeatedly nursed him during his recurring bouts of illness. According to Rahel Yanait Manya attempted to commit suicide in the early 1920s.

Gideon Shochat was a pilot in the British Royal Air Force (RAF) during World War II and later became one of the founding pilots of the Israeli Air Force, rising to the rank of colonel. He committed suicide in 1967. In 1971, his daughter Alona married Arik Einstein, a famous Israeli performer. They had 2 daughters together. They later divorced, the daughters remaining with their mother. They later became Orthodox Jews, and the daughters married Uri Zohar's sons. Zohar was a good friend of Einstein and became one of the leading figures in the Orthodox community.

In a 1986 interview in Haaretz Anna revealed how estranged she and her brother became from their parents. Geda had been left in Palestine when Manya and Israel were exiled to Bursa. He was first looked after in Kinneret but later cared for by an Arab family. After the war the children were bought up in the children's house in Kfar Giladi.

=== In Palestine ===
As a result of her first visit, Manya reached a conclusion which anticipated that of Arthur Ruppin. She understood that the model of plantation settlement, favored by Baron Rothschild, where Jewish owners employed Arab workers and were subject to economic overseers, could never be the basis for Jewish national life. It led to financial difficulties and disaffection. She concluded that only collective agricultural settlement could produce Jewish workers and farmers who would be the basis for building a Jewish homeland. Her first priority was finding a solution for the problem in Hauran.

Manya left for Paris, where one of her brothers was editor of an agricultural journal, to research the feasibility of her ideas and then to convince the Baron to back them. In 1905, a fresh wave of pogroms swept the Russian Empire. Meir Cohen, an old friend from Minsk, came to Paris seeking the aid of the Jewish community to buy arms so they could defend themselves. Manya laid aside the Hauran project and put her efforts towards fundraising instead. She convinced Rothschild to donate 50 000 gold francs to that end.

Guns and ammunition were bought in Liège and smuggled into Russia. To deliver the final consignment, Manya disguised herself as a young rabbanit from Frankfurt, bringing eight cases of scriptures, a gift for the yeshivot of Ukraine. The guns were successfully delivered to the Jewish underground. Not one was lost.

Manya returned to Palestine in 1906 to further pursue her Hauran plan. Towards the end of the year, she traveled to the United States to raise funds for that and arms for Russian Jews. Whilst in America she met Judah Magnes, and they formed a long lasting friendship. The idea of collective settlements in general, and the Hauran scheme in particular, received no support. She realized that the only way to convince people that it could work was by putting it into practice, so she returned to Palestine in 1907. Manya shared her idea with members of Poale Zion and "Hapoel Hatzair". Hankin convinced Eliahu Krauze to give them stewardship over a failing agricultural experiment in Sejera for a year. Manya was appointed manager responsible for establishing a training farm at Sejara. The farm was used as cover by Bar Giora a newly formed underground militia founded by Israel Shochat and Yitzhak Ben-Zvi. The following year Bar Giora reinvented itself as HaShomer. Its goal was to take over the responsibility of guarding Jewish settlements which had previously been using local watchmen.

She married Israel Shochat in May 1908.

They moved to the German Colony, Haifa in 1910. Three years later they moved to Constantinople where Manya taught German whilst Israel studied for an Ottoman law degree

In November 1914 she was arrested and sent to Damascus for interrogation and was subsequently deported, along with her husband to Bursa, in Turkey. They returned around Passover, 1919, after attending the Poale Zion convention in Stockholm.

In 1921 she was in Tel Aviv when riots broke out with Arab mobs attacking Jews in Jaffa. Along with other Hashomer members, she took part in the fighting. At great risk, she would walk around, disguised as a Red Cross nurse, to keep an eye out on developments. Her experience in Russia came in handy as they attempted to smuggle in grenades for the defenders of Petah-Tikva. She hid them among baskets of vegetables and eggs. The car they were in got mired just outside the town. A patrol of Indian cavalry approached. Their role was to search all travelers for arms. With great presence of mind, Manya averted disaster. She ran up to the patrol, begging them to help rescue the car from the mud. While they were pulling it out, she watched the baskets, saying that she didn't want the eggs to break. The cavalry then even provided an escort until they got into town.

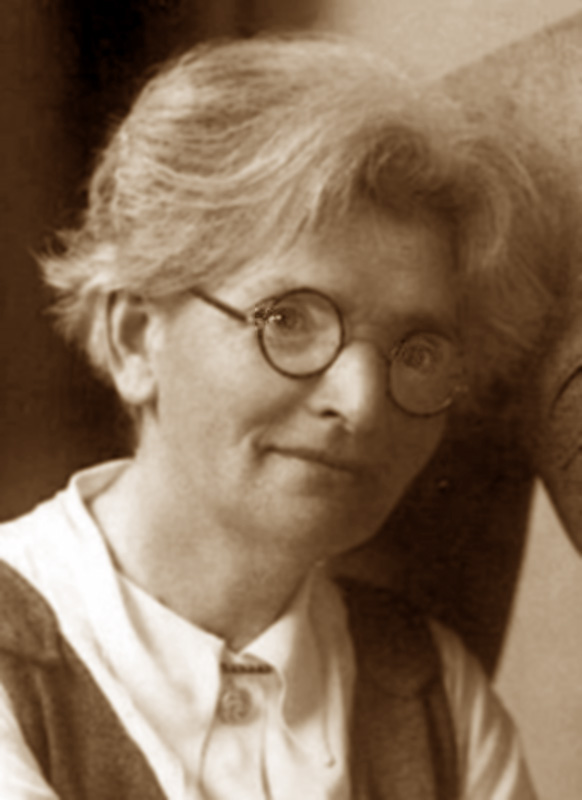
Shochat in the 1930s

After the riots were over, she traveled to the United States to raise funds for the defense efforts. Due to a series of differences of opinion between her and Pinhas Rutenberg, the transfer of funds was frozen and the two didn't speak for years. However, she did manage to send several thousand dollars to her husband who was waiting in Vienna, earmarked for the purchase of weapons for the Haganah. Israel Shochat oversaw the procurement and shipment of the weapons to Palestine.

Following the dissolution of Hashomer in 1920 Manya and other veterans established a new secret organisation calling themselves the Circle. One of their bases was at Kfar Giladi and their first action, May 1923, was the assassination of Tawfiq Bey, a senior police officer in Jaffa at the time of the riots.

In 1924 she was among those arrested in connection with the assassination of Jacob de Haan. She subsequently broke off relations with Ben Gurion over his failure to come to her defence when it was known that the Haganah in Jerusalem had ordered the killing.

In 1925 she joined Brit Shalom, a Jewish group that advocated a bi-national state in Palestine.

Manya and Israel Shochat were active in the Gdud HaAvoda (lit.: the "Work Battalion") and clandestine immigration, as well as arms smuggling. In 1930, Manya Shochat was among the founders of the League for Arab-Jewish Friendship. In 1948 she joined the Mapam party.

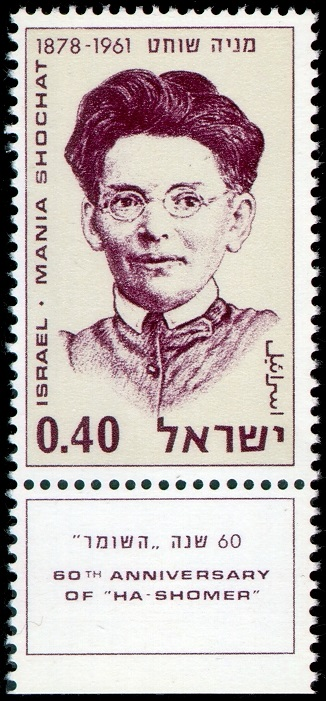
Manya Shochat on a stamp issued on the 60th anniversary of HaShomer, 1970.

== Literary and cultural references ==
Mania Shochat's life is the subject of a novel by Israeli author Dvora Omer. Manya Shochat is a main character in Amos Gitai's 2003 film, Berlin-Jerusalem. Her character's name in the film is Tania Shohat.
