= Operation Balak =

1948 undercover operation to smuggle aircraft from Eastern Europe to Israel

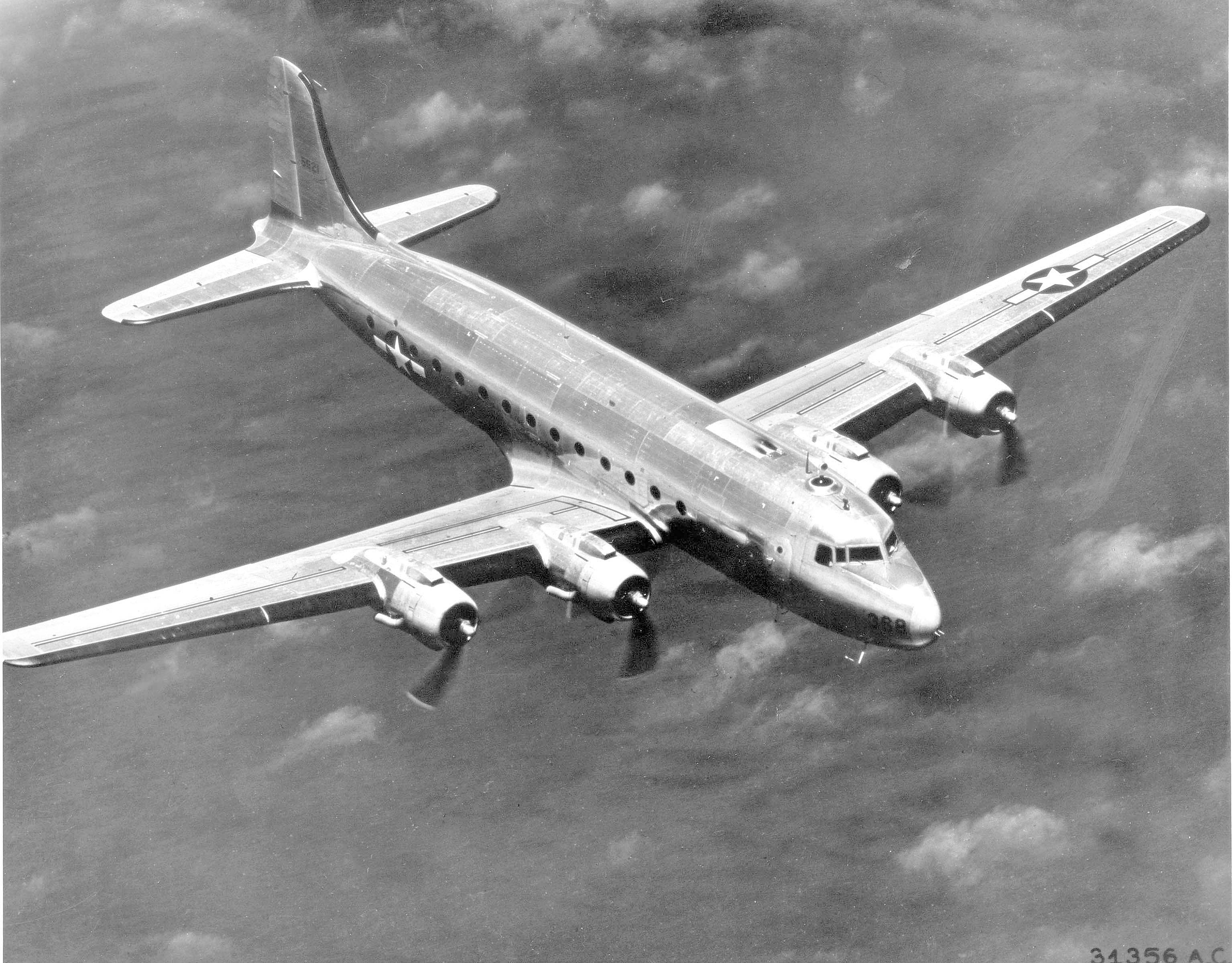
A Douglas C-54 Skymaster, one of the airplane types used for Operation Balak

Operation Balak was a smuggling operation, during the founding of Israel in 1948, that purchased arms in Europe to avoid various embargoes and boycotts transferring them to the Yishuv. Of particular note was the delivery of 23 Czechoslovakia-made Avia S-199 fighters, the post-war version of the German Luftwaffe Messerschmitt Bf 109.

== Key personnel ==
A former Royal Air Force pilot and gentile named Gordon Levett, who served in World War II, volunteered for the Israel Machal (the overseas volunteer unit) early in 1948 along with a few Jewish pilots (among others the future president Ezer Weizman) from Britain. Brought up in poverty in Sussex, England, Levett had an affinity for the underdog. "Looking back, I have neither failed nor succeeded, the fate of most of us," Levett reflected later, "but I shall leave the world a better place than when I entered it because I helped found the State of Israel."

Initially, Levett was regarded with deep suspicion. "Not only was he not a Jew, but Mr. Levett was particularly notable because he was British," said The New York Times. "To most Israelis at that time, the recently lapsed British mandate in Palestine had been decidedly pro-Arab, and British Government policy was seen as anti-Zionist."

"Recruited in March 1948 by emissaries in Europe of the Haganah, the Jewish fighting force in Palestine, Mr. Levett was viewed with a healthy dose of suspicion," noted the Times. "'In my last interview I was told, 'We're quite convinced that you are a British spy, but we're going to take you to see what you're up to,'" he recalled.

== Operation details ==
In June, Levett was given the task of flying Avia S-199 fighters, supplied by Czechoslovakia from the Czechoslovak Air Force airfield (code-named Etzion or Zebra by Israelis) near Žatec (seventy-five kilometers west of Prague) to Ekron airfield (formerly RAF Aqir) close to Rehovot now Tel Nof Israeli Air Force Base. The airfield near Žatec had been put at disposal of the Haganah by a new Czechoslovak foreign minister Vladimír Clementis (a prominent Slovak member of the Communist Party of Czechoslovakia) and was under the command of Yehuda Ben Chorin. Operation Balak lasted three months, during which time Levett managed to airlift tons of arms, ammunition and personnel. During the first ferry flight of 15 aircraft, three were forced to land in Greece due to poor navigation, and were interned. After a defector revealed the existence of the base code-named "Zebra" in USA, and the US made a representation to the UN to have the base shut down, the operation shifted to the air base close to the Yugoslav town of Nikšić.

== Name origin ==
The name is a reference to the Balak, king of the Moabites, son of Zippor, whose name is mentioned in Numbers 22:2. By extension, the name came to mean 'Destroyer.'

== See also ==
- Arms shipments from Czechoslovakia to Israel 1947–49
