= Independent Jewish Workers Party =

Independent Jewish Workers Party Еврейская независимая рабочая партия
- Founded: 1901
- Dissolved: June 1903
- Headquarters: Minsk

The Independent Jewish Workers Party (Russian: Еврейская независимая рабочая партия) was a Jewish political party in Russia. The party was founded in 1901 on the initiative of Sergei Zubatov, the head of the Tsarist secret police (the Okhrana). Zubatov had been impressed by the growth of the General Jewish Labour Bund, a clandestine Jewish socialist party. The Independent Jewish Workers Party was intended to counter the influence of the Bund, mobilizing Tsarist loyalty among Jewish workers. The party argued that Jewish workers would benefit economically from Tsarist rule, as long as they stayed aloof of political protests. Its followers were nicknamed Zubatovchikes.

The party had its headquarters in Minsk, and local branches in Vilno, Kraslava, Bobruisk and Odessa. The party was led by disgruntled former Bundists such Manya Wilbushewitz (later Shochat), A. Tschermerisky, G. Shakhnovich and Y. Volin. The party was also joined by figures from the Minsk faction of Poale Zion, such as Joseph Goldberg and Hayyah Kagan. In 1902, the party was joined by Heinrich Shayevich (a General Zionist). The total membership of the party probably never went beyond 4,000.

The Bund fiercely opposed the launching of the Independent Jewish Workers Party. When the party held demonstrations, the Bund organized militant counter-manifestations. The party often had to cancel meetings due to Bundist protests. Due to anti-Jewish policies of the Tsarist government, manifested through pogroms, the party failed to take root. In 1903 the Minister of Interior, Vyacheslav von Plehve, ordered that the party disband itself. On February 5, 1903, the party informed its members in Vilno that party activities would temporarily cease. In June, a party conference decided to liquidate the party.
