= Arms shipments from Czechoslovakia to Israel =

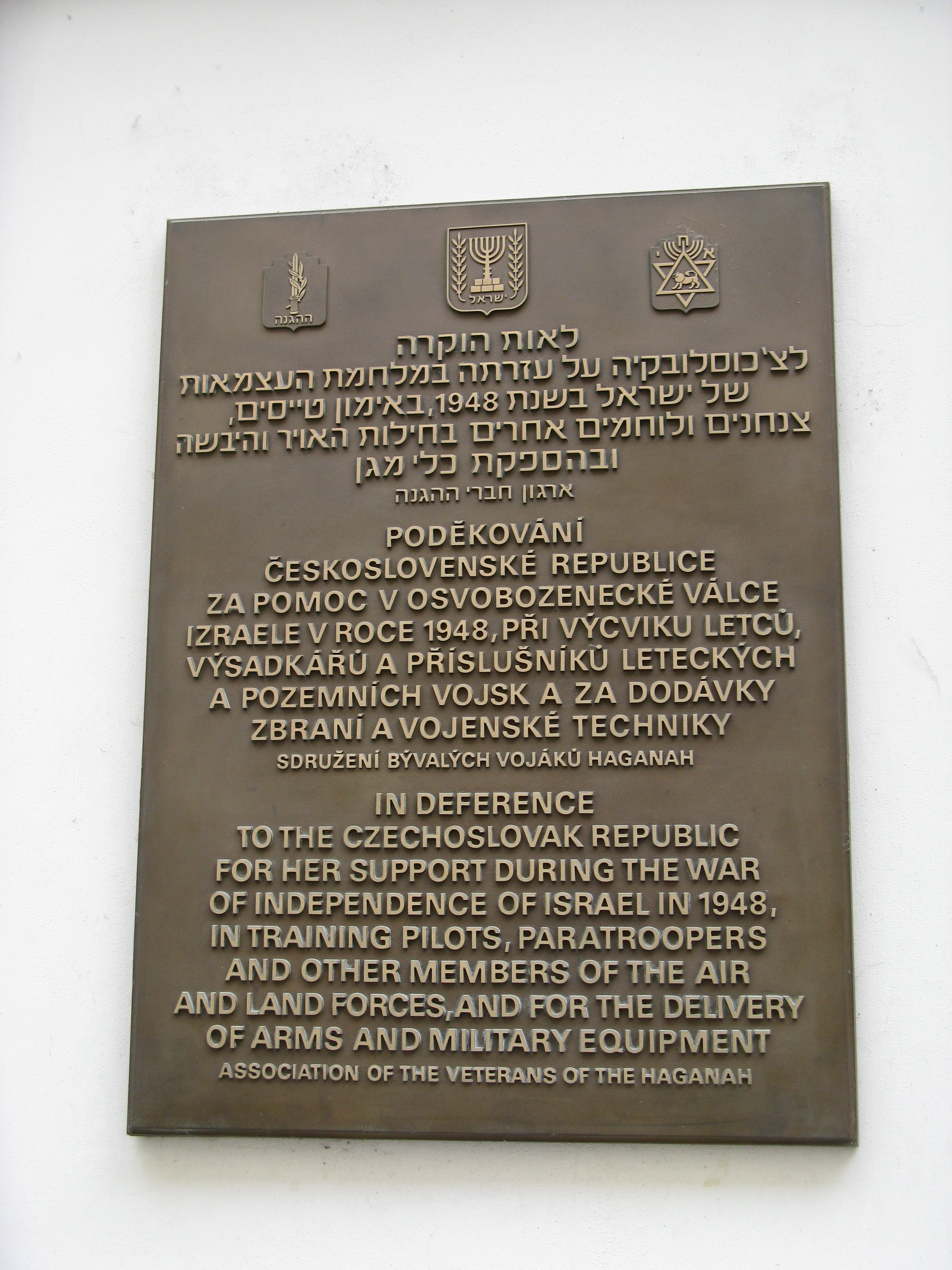
Acknowledgement of the association of the veterans of the Haganah to Czechoslovakia, in Josefov, Prague

Between June 1947 and October 31, 1949, the Jewish agency (later to become the Israeli government) seeking weapons for Operation Balak, made several purchases of weapons in Czechoslovakia, some of them of former German army weapons, captured by the Czechoslovak army on its national territory, or newly produced German weapons from Czechoslovakia's post-war production. In this deal, sale activities of Czechoslovak arms factories were coordinated by a special-purpose department of the Československé závody strojírenské a kovodělné, n.p. (Czechoslovak Metal-Working and Engineering Works, Nat.Ent.) Holding, called Sekretariát D (Secretariat D), headed by Gen. Jan Heřman (ret.).

The deliveries from Czechoslovakia proved important for the establishment of Israel.

== The arms contracts and deliveries ==
The first contract was signed on January 14, 1948, by Jan Masaryk, the Czech foreign minister. Ideology played no role in these initial transaction. They were exclusively commercial. The contract included 200 MG 34 machine guns, 4,500 P 18 rifles and 50,400,000 rounds of ammunition.

Syria bought from Czechoslovakia a quantity of arms for the Arab Liberation Army but the shipment arrived in Israel due to Haganah intervention.

=== Deliveries ===
The first shipment of two hundred rifles, forty MG-34 machine guns, and bullets, secretly landed during the night of 31 March – 1 April at a makeshift airfield at Beit Daras in a Douglas C-54 Skymaster aircraft chartered from American carrier Atlantic Northern Airlines (in many accounts the airline is named as Ocean Trade Airways; as indicated in the article on Atlantic Northern, the two were the same). The second larger shipment, covered with onions and potatoes—of forty-five hundred rifles and two hundred machine guns, with bullets, arrived at Tel Aviv port aboard the Nora on 2 April. (A third shipment of ten thousand rifles, 1,415 machine guns, and bullets, reached the Yishuv by sea on 28 April.) At last, the Haganah command had at hand a stockpile of thousands of weapons that it could freely deploy. The two shipments proved decisive. Without doubt, of all the shipments that subsequently reached the Yishuv, none was to have greater immediate impact or historical significance."

Total deliveries (confirmed until October 1948)
Infantry weapons

- 34,500 P-18 rifles
- 5,515 MG 34 machine guns with 10,000 ammo belts
- 10,000 vz.24 bayonets
- 900 vz. 37 heavy machine guns
- 500 vz. 27 pistols
- 12 ZK-383 submachine guns
- 10 ZK 420 semi-automatic rifles
- 500 vz. 26 light machine guns (shipped, yet delivery not confirmed in Czech sources)

Infantry ammunition

- 91,500,000 7.92×57mm Mauser cartridges
- 15,000,000 9mm Parabellum cartridges
- 375,000 13mm cartridges for MG 131
- 150,000 20mm cartridges for MG 151
- 375,000 7.65mm cartridges for vz. 27 pistol

=== Aircraft ===
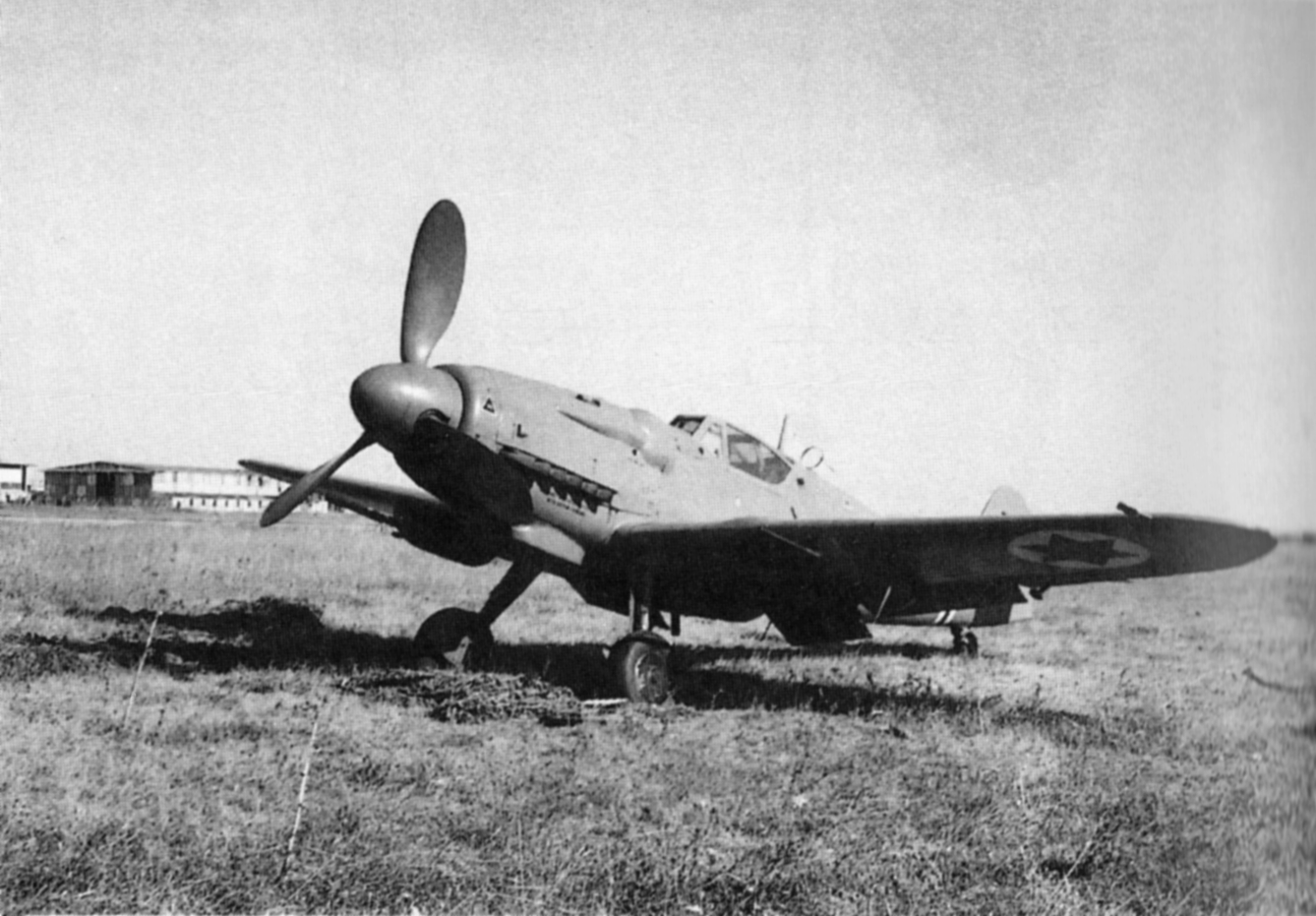
Israeli Avia S-199, 1948

- 25 Avia S-199 fighters
- 61 Supermarine Spitfire Mk. IX fighters

Some of the aircraft were lost en route to Israel. The delivery of aircraft began on May 20, 1948, and was conducted from the Czech airfield near the town of Žatec. Some of Avia fighters were dismantled and flown to Israel in transport airplanes.

Some of the deliveries were not finished until after cessation of hostilities. Only eighteen Spitfires reached Israel prior to end of war by direct flight from Czechoslovakia during Operation Velvetta, including 6 in September and 12 in December 1948, both with a refueling stop in Yugoslavia. During the second run, Spitfires were repainted in Yugoslav Air Force markings for the flight from Kunovice to Nikšić. The rest were shipped in crates, officially declared as scrap iron, along with 12 Merlin 66 engines, and deliveries lasted until the end of April 1950.

== Other defense cooperation ==
Czechoslovakia also trained 81 pilots and 69 ground crew specialists, some of them later forming the first fighter unit of the Israeli Air Force, and on Czechoslovak soil a group of Jewish volunteers the size of approximately a brigade (about 1,300 men and women) were also trained, from August 20 until November 4, 1948. The Czechoslovak Armed Force's codename of the training (mainly) was «DI» (an abbreviation from "Důvěrné Izrael", literally meaning "Classified, Israel"). A Moto-Mechanized Brigade Group of Jewish volunteers trained in Czechoslovakia didn't take part in the 1948 war.

== Sources ==
- Jan Skramoušský: Zbraně pro Izrael, Střelecký Magazín 11/2005
- Arnold Krammer: The Forgotten Friendship - Israel and the Soviet Bloc, 1947–53, University of Illinois Press 1974pp. 54–123.
