= Bar Giora (organization) =

Jewish militia, 1907–1909

- בר גיורא
- Active: 1907–1909
- Country: Palestine, Ottoman Empire
- Type: Paramilitary
- Mottos: "In fire and blood did Judea fall; in blood and fire Judea shall rise."

Bar Giora (Hebrew: בר גיורא) was a secret Zionist organization in Palestine (then part of the Ottoman Empire) from 1907 to 1909. The group was composed primarily of Russian Jewish immigrants of the Second Aliyah. The organization was a precursor of Hashomer, itself a precursor of the Haganah and the Israel Defense Force.

== History ==
Bar Giora's founder, Israel Shochat, immigrated to the Ottoman Mutasarrifate of Jerusalem in 1904 from the Russian Empire as part of the Second Aliyah. He had experience of underground militias during the Tzarist pogroms of 1903-1906 and on his arrival he came under the influence of Michael Halperin, attracted by his talk of an army of Jewish fighters. Shochat established a small group of about 25 loyal followers and in 1906 launched the local branch of Poale Zion with about 60 members. In 1907, Yitzhak Ben-Zvi arrived from Poltava; as leader of Russian Poale Zion he had been on the run from the secret police for a year. Shochat and Ben-Zvi travelled together to the 8th World Zionist Congress in The Hague and on their return established the first incarnation of Bar Giora.

On September 28, 1907, a group met in Ben-Zvi's Jaffa room: Israel Shochat, Yitzhak Ben-Zvi, Alexander Zeid, Mendel Portugali, Israel Giladi, Yehezkel Hankin, Yehezkel Nissanov and Moshe Givoni. They swore themselves to absolute secrecy—on pain of death ("death by snake bite" i.e. sudden execution)—and absolute allegiance to their leader, Israel Shochat. As a motto, they chose a line from Ya'akov Cahan's poem, Habiryonim: "In fire and blood did Judea fall; in blood and fire Judea shall rise."

The organization was named after Simon Bar Giora, one of the leaders of the first century Jewish Revolt against Roman rule. Shabtai Teveth argued that "[t]he society's name attested to its triple objective: to form a Hebrew military force that would organize and implement an armed uprising to bring about its ultimate aim, the creation of an independent Jewish state." The organization focused on replacing Arab guards with Jewish ones in Zionist settlements in the remote colonies in Upper Galilee. In October 1907, Shochat led an expanded group to Sejera, leaving Ben-Zvi in Jaffa as their man inside Poale Zion.

When Hashomer was formed on April 12, 1909, Bar Giora was absorbed into it. David Ben Gurion was not included in this decision, influencing his dealings with Hashomer.

== See also ==
- Kfar Giladi
