= Gdud HaAvoda =

Zionist work group in Mandatory Palestine

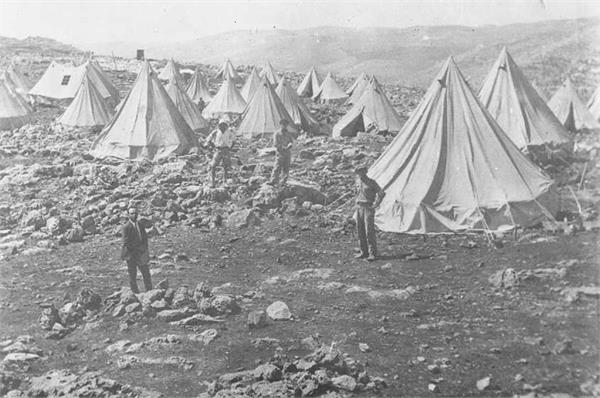
Gdud HaAvoda camp in Rehavia, Jerusalem in 1939

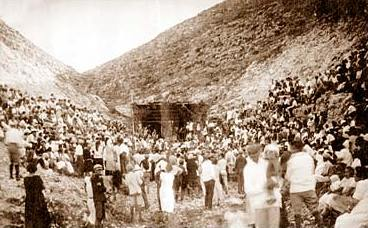
Gdud HaAvoda members gathered for concert by Jasha Heifetz at Ein Harod in 1926

The Labour Battalion or Gdud HaAvoda (Hebrew: גדוד העבודה) was a Labor Zionist work group in Mandatory Palestine.

== History ==
Officially known as the Yosef Trumpeldor Labor and Defense Battalion (Hebrew: גדוד העבודה וההגנה על־שם יוסף טרומפלדור), Gdud HaAvoda was established on 8 August 1920 for the purpose of Jewish labor, settlement and defense. It was named after Joseph Trumpeldor, who was killed at Tel Hai by Lebanese Shia villagers, and was joined by many of Trumpeldor's followers who had made aliyah from Crimea; initial membership was around 80.

The group drained swamps, paved roads, worked in agriculture and construction, establishing several kibbutzim, including Tel Yosef (14 December 1921), Ein Harod (22 September 1921), Kfar Giladi and Ramat Rachel. Many former members left to join the Solel Boneh construction company after learning their trade in the battalion.

In 1923 the battalion split on ideological grounds; the left-wing demanded socialism, whilst the right-wing were more interested in Zionist pioneering. Despite the split, by 1925 the group had over 650 members, including Israel Shochat, Manya Shochat and Yitzhak Sadeh.

In December 1926 a communist faction of the battalion was expelled. Some members of the faction returned to Russia, where they formed a commune named Vojo Nova (Esperanto for "A New Way"), which was later liquidated and turned into a kolkhoz in 1933. The following year Gdud HaAvoda stopped work, and in 1929 it was dissolved after Kfar Giladi, Ramat Rachel, Tel Hai and Tel Yosef formed the HaKibbutz HaMeuhad movement.
