= Yehezkel Nisanov =

One of the founders of Hashomer

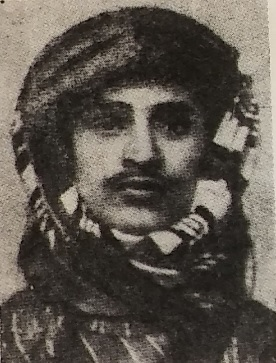
- Born: 1886; Dagestan, Caucasus, Russian Empire
- Died: 1911 (aged 24–25); Ottoman Syria, Ottoman Empire
- Relatives: Shoshana Nisanov (Mother); Shimon Nisanov (Father); Zvi Nisanov (Brother); Yehuda Nisanov (Brother); Ossip Assaf Nisanov (Brother); Nissim Nisanov (Brother)
- Military career
- Allegiance: Hashomer
- Known for: One of the founders of Hashomer

Yehezkel Nisanov (Hebrew: יחזקאל ניסנוב; 1886-1911) was a founding member of Jewish defense organizations in Eretz Israel.

He became involved in the Russian Social Democratic Party and was one of the founders of the Bar Giora group, and Hashomer.

== Life ==
Nisanov was born in 1886 in Tamir-Khan-Shura to a family of Mountain Jews. Growing up in poverty, he began working at a young age and later moved to Baku to study sewing, where he became involved in the Russian Social Democratic Party and eventually the Poalei Zion movement. Because of Zionist aspirations he immigrated to Ottoman Syria in 1906, together with his family. He played a significant role as one of the early founders of the Bar Giora militia and later Hashomer. Settling in the Galilee, he dedicated himself to land guarding and acquisition.

== Death ==
Nisanov was killed by Arab thieves on February 13, 1911, near Yavne'el and Beit Gan (now part of Yavne'el) after refusing to give up his cart and mules. Israel Giladi, one of the leaders of Hashomer, wrote of his death:

Of course, he preferred to be killed rather than to give up his mules to the Arabs. When they stole the animals from some farmer Nisanov would reproach him bitterly: "How is it that you are still alive and your animals are gone? Shame on you!" And now he has shown that he was as good as his word.
