= Sergei Zubatov =

Russian politician (1864–1917)

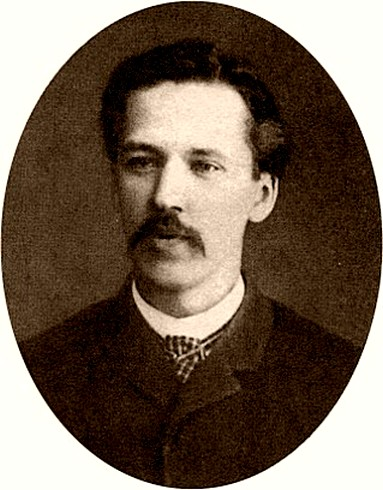
- Born: Sergei Vasilyevich Zubatov; March 26 (O.S.), 1864; Moscow
- Died: March 15 (N.S.), 1917 (aged 52); Moscow, Russia
- Cause of death: Suicide by gunshot
- Occupation: Police agent
- Employer: Okhrana

Sergei Vasilyevich Zubatov (Russian: Серге́й Васи́льевич Зуба́тов, IPA: [zʊˈbatəf]; April 7 [March 26 O.S.], 1864 – March 15, 1917) was a Russian police administrator, best known as the advocate of "police socialism", which included creating legal, police-controlled trade unions.

== Biography ==
Born in Moscow as the son of a police chief, Sergei Zubatov became involved in revolutionary circles as a schoolboy and was expelled at the age of 16 at his father's instigation. His father also made him marry an army officer's daughter, Aleksandra Nikolayevna Mikhina, in the hope that marriage would keep him out of trouble. Instead, the couple ran a bookshop that became a gathering place for revolutionaries. In 1886, if not earlier, he was persuaded by N. S. Berdyaev, the head of the Moscow Okhrana, the department responsible for suppressing the revolutionary movement, to become an informant, under the threat of expulsion from Moscow. Information that he passed to the police led to the closure of three illegal printing-shops and to the arrests of several revolutionaries, including Mikhail Gots. By 1888 rumours about his double life had spread through revolutionary circles, so he stopped acting as a spy, and in 1889 joined the staff of the Okhrana. He systematized security policing in Russia, using the typical methods then prevalent in Europe of plainclothes police-detectives (known in Russia as filyory - Russian: филёры), whose actions he coordinated with the centerpiece of his system, undercover informants (секретные сотрудники). He was a master at interrogating radical activists and occasionally winning them over to his side, arguing that the Russian Empire could do more for the poor than could terrorists and agitators who would only bring down upon the people the heavy hand of reaction.

Despite rumors, Zubatov was never a Colonel (Polkovnik) in the Special Corps of Gendarmes, but he was rapidly promoted so that in 1896, at the age of 32, he was appointed head of the Moscow Okhrana Bureau, making him the official in charge of investigating and suppressing political dissent in Russia's second city.

Despite his deeply-held monarchist convictions, Zubatov earnestly believed that repression alone could not crush the revolutionary movement. Between 1901 and 1903, he also promoted the organization of pro-government trade unions to channel protest away from agitation - a practice revolutionary activists called police socialism or lambasted as Zubatovshchina (Russian: зуба́товщина, IPA: [zʊˈbatəfɕːɪnə]).

In February 1901 the Tsarist authorities brought in Cossacks to suppress mass demonstrations by thousands of students and workers in Moscow. In May 1901 the Moscow Chief of Police, General Dmitri Feodorovich Trepov, allowed the Community of Mutual Help of the Workers in Mechanized Industry (Russian: Общество взаимного вспомоществования рабочих в механическом производстве) to hold its inaugural meeting in Moscow. With Zubatov's support, the society was created by self-educated factory workers, who were paid a stipend by the Okhrana. The new body provoked objections from factory owners (who claimed that it was inciting unrest), and from factory inspectors (who felt that it undermined their authority). The Prime Minister, Count Sergei Witte, backed the objections, but was unable to close down the experiment because Zubatov had the backing of the Tsar's uncle, Grand Duke Sergei Alexandrovich, the Governor-General of Moscow. On 19 February 1902, Zubatov succeeded in orchestrating a loyal demonstration with religious overtones by about 50,000 workers, outside the Kremlin, in honour of the former Emperor Alexander II - despite a call from the Moscow committee of the Russian Social Democratic Labour Party to boycott the ceremony.

In August 1902 the Minister of the Interior, Plehve transferred Zubatov to Saint Petersburg as head of a special police department, but his attempts to introduce 'police socialism' in the capital city were hindered by the greater awareness and suspicion of police agents. Other societies similar to the Moscow model formed in Odessa, and Kiev. In Minsk, Zubatov encouraged the creation of the Jewish Independent Labour Party, to counter the influence of the Marxist General Jewish Labour Bund, and the holding of the first legal Zionist Congress, in 1902. But Zubatov proved unable to persuade the government to enact any actual improvement in labour legislation. In July 1903, thousands of workers took part in a general strike in Odessa which lasted two weeks before being violently repressed by police and Cossacks. A month later, on 19 August 1903, Interior Minister Vyacheslav von Plehve summoned Zubatov, accused him of fomenting strikes and betraying secrets, sacked him, and banned him from living in the Saint Petersburg or Moscow Governorates. The state-sponsored trade unions were disbanded. Many of their members joined the organization of Georgy Gapon, who led a demonstration of workers to present a petition to the Emperor at the Winter Palace which led to the Bloody Sunday massacre of January 1905 and the beginning of the 1905 Russian Revolution. After the assassination of Plehve in July 1904, Zubatov was allowed back into the capital and invited to rejoin the police, but he refused, partly in order to protect the life of his son, whom he feared revolutionary activists might threaten. He retired to private life, living off his state pension.

Zubatov committed suicide during the February Revolution of March 1917 after hearing the news of the Emperor's abdication.
