= Gideon Shochat =

Israeli diplomat (1912–1966)

Gideon "Geda" Shochat
- גדעון "גדע" שוחט
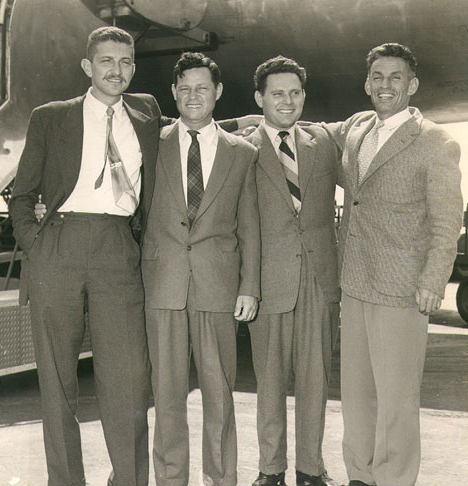
- A delegation of four officers sent by David Ben Gurion to collect funds in the United States in 1956. From left to right: Ezer Weizmann, Yossi Harel, Nachman Karni, and Gideon Shohat.
- Born: December 26, 1912; Haifa, Ottoman Empire
- Died: December 19, 1966 (aged 53); Herzliya, Israel
- Children: Alona Einstein

Gideon (Geda) Shochat (Hebrew: גדעון (גדע) שוחט; 1912–1966) was an Israeli military officer and diplomat. After serving as a pilot in Royal Air Force during World War II, he served in the Israeli Air Force and reached the rank of colonel. He also served as the Israeli ambassador to Malawi. Shochat's daughter Alona was married to Israeli singer Arik Einstein.

== Early life ==
Geda Shochat was born in Haifa, then part of the Ottoman Empire, in 1912 to Jewish parents, Zionist activists and politicians Manya and Israel Shochat. He grew up in Kfar Giladi, a kibbutz founded in part by his parents, and was educated at the Mikveh Israel boarding school near Tel Aviv.

== World War II ==
In 1941, Shochat enlisted in the Royal Air Force and was sent to Asmara, Eritrea, to work as a machinist. After a few months, he returned to Mandatory Palestine. In 1943, he finished pilot training in Rhodesia and served as a pilot in Egypt. Towards the end of World War II, he was deployed to Karachi and served as the commander of a B-24 Liberator.

== Israeli War of Independence ==
Shochat joined the Israeli 103 Squadron in 1948. He was involved in Operation Velvetta to smuggle aircraft to Israel from Czechoslovakia for the Israeli War of Independence.

== Later life ==
In 1964, Shochat was appointed as the Israeli ambassador to Malawi. Shochat committed suicide in 1966 and was given a military funeral at Kiryat Shaul Cemetery.
