= Gur Alroey =

Historian and president of the University of Haifa

- Official portrait, 2024

President of the University of Haifa
- Incumbent
- Assumed office October 2024

Personal details
- Born: September 10, 1968 (age 58) Tel Aviv

Gur Alroey (Hebrew: גור אלרואי; born September 10, 1968) is an Israeli historian specializing in the modern Jewish history, specifically researching Jewish immigration. He is the President of the University of Haifa.

A professor in the Department of Land of Israel Studies at the University of Haifa, he is the founder and head of the Ruderman Program for the Study of American Jewry. He served as Dean of the Faculty of Humanities at the University from October 2016 to October 2019. From April 2021 to October 2024, he served as Rector of the University, and in January 2024, he was elected the President, assuming office in October 2024.

== Early life and education ==
Gur Alroey was born in Tel Aviv-Yafo, Israel and he was raised by his parents with his two brothers in Ramat Eshkol, Jerusalem. His father, Yoash Alroey was the director of the sports department of Israeli television. He completed his high school studies at the Rene Kassin School in Jerusalem. In 1987, he enlisted and served as a soldier, and later an officer, in the Givati Brigade. He was discharged from the IDF in 1991 with the rank of lieutenant. Later on, he joined the IDF's Missing Persons and is still in reserve service and holds the rank of Major. In his service he has solved three cases of missing persons from the Israeli War of Independence.

His academic journey began at the Hebrew University of Jerusalem. He completed his undergraduate studies in 1995 in the Department of Jewish History and the Department of General History. In 1997, he completed his master's degree with distinction at the Avraham Harman Research Institute for Contemporary Jewry at the Hebrew University. His master's thesis dealt with the issue of suicide during the Second and Third Aliyah periods. Alroey continued his doctoral studies at the same research institute and wrote a doctoral thesis on Jewish immigration to the Land of Israel in the early 20th century: the case of the Second Aliyah under the supervision of Prof. Hagit Lavsky and Prof. Gideon Shimoni.

== Academic career ==
In 2002, Alroey was accepted as a lecturer in the Department of Land of Israel Studies at the University of Haifa. Between 2006–2009, he served as Head of the Department of Land of Israel Studies. In 2010, he was appointed Associate Professor. In 2014, he was appointed Full Professor. Between 2009–2011 he served as a visiting professor at New York University and Columbia University. Upon his return to Israel, he was appointed Head of the School of History at the University of Haifa, a position he held until 2016. In 2016, he was elected Dean of the Faculty of Humanities at the University of Haifa.

In 2013, Alroey initiated and established the Ruderman Program for American Jewish Studies, a unique and pioneering program in Israeli academia in partnership with the Ruderman Family Foundation. The Ruderman Program covers a wide range of topics related to Jewish life in the United States, American society, and the long-term and important relationship between the American Jewish community, the State of Israel, and Israeli society.

In 2021, he was appointed as Rector of the University of Haifa, a position he held until he assumed office as the 12th President of the University of Haifa in October 2024.

Professor Alroey has published seven books on Jewish immigration in the early 20th century and on territorial ideology. He has published numerous articles in leading journals in Israel and abroad. He teaches courses at the University of Haifa on a variety of topics, including: "Jewish Immigration to the United States and the Land of Israel," "Zionism and Its Opponents," and "Mandatory Land of Israel." In addition to his prolific research, he served as a consultant to the Red Star Line Museum in Antwerp, Belgium.

== Research ==
Alroey's numerous studies have left their mark on the study of Jewish immigration in general and on the study of Jewish immigration to the Land of Israel in particular. They are considered groundbreaking due to the unique methodology he developed and his original conclusions.

His contributions revolved around four main axes:

The Individual Axis

Alroey's basic premise is that migration is first and foremost an individual experience. It must be examined from the perspective of the migrant in order to determine its nature. In Alroey's research, the individual migrant and his family serve as a central analytical category. Through the analysis of new and primary sources in the Zionist and Jewish historiography of migration research, the manifestations and processes of the Jewish migrant are revealed, from the moment the decision to migrate is made to the moment of arrival in the destination country. In most migration studies, this initial stage is taken for granted and no effort is devoted to analyzing it, while in Alroey's research, this stage is revealed as crucial and essential for understanding the migration process in its entirety.

The Comparative Axis and Multidisciplinarity

In Alroey's research, the comparative perspective was used to examine the composition of immigrants, the waves of immigration, the countries of origin of Jewish immigrants, and more. One of Alroey's main research contributions in this context is the exposure of immigrant groups who arrived in Israel but were not recognized in Zionist historiography.

The Gender Axis

To understand society in general and immigrant society in particular, Alroey examines the gender experience in the context of the active and passive involvement of women in migration processes and investigates negative social phenomena that accompany the migration process, phenomena such as: abandonment of women, rape, prostitution, and trafficking.

The Typological Distinction between Olim and Migrants

In this axis, Alroey's studies embody a typological distinction between Olim and migrants based on a semantic analysis of these terms in Zionist thought. Alroey opposed a common claim in historiography that 'aliyah' is a neutral term. According to him, the term is imbued with a value and ideological content that, on the one hand, attributes a national motivation to every Jew who comes to the Land of Israel, and on the other, obscures, to the point of eliminating, other factors of migration. According to Alroey, this is a clear example of the mobilization of a language for the purposes of a national movement. Therefore, he believes that the historian is not required to accept the national terminology without question and must examine immigration to the Land of Israel using the same standards accepted in the study of general immigration. As a solution and a challenge, Alroey proposes a typological distinction between the two terms that define entry into a new country, whether it is the Land of Israel or another destination country: "aliyah" and "immigration".

== Prizes and awards ==
- 2001: The Lucius N. Littauer Foundation Award
- 2002: The Warburg Prize presented by the Research Institute of Contemporary Jewry
- 2002: The Moshe Davis Prize presented by the Research Institute of Contemporary Jewry
- 2005: The University of Haifa Hecht Prize
- 2013: The Association of Israel Studies (AIS) award for young promising scholar
