= Ilaniya =

Ilaniya: אִילָנִיָּה (Hebrew)
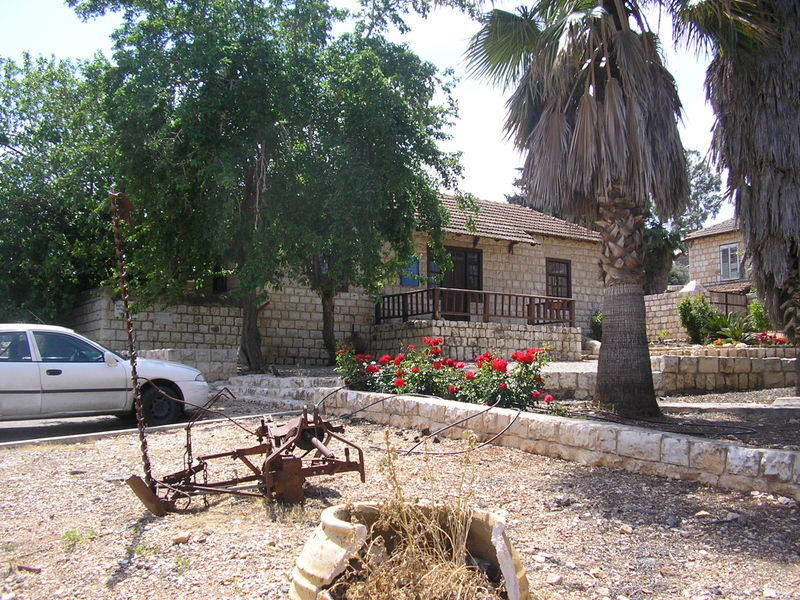

- Location within Northeast Israel
- Coordinates: 32°45′30″N 35°24′7″E
- Country: Israel
- District: Northern
- Subdistrict: Kinneret
- Council: Lower Galilee
- Affiliation: Agricultural Union
- Founded: 1899; 127 years ago
- Founder: Jewish Colonization Association
- Population (2024): 528

Ilaniya (Hebrew: אִילָנִיָּה) is a moshav in northern Israel. Also known as Sejera, after the adjacent Arab village al-Shajara, it was the first Jewish settlement in the Lower Galilee and played an important role in the Jewish settlement of the Galilee from its early years until the 1948 Arab–Israeli War. It falls under the jurisdiction of Lower Galilee Regional Council, and had a population of 528 in 2024.

== History ==
=== Ancient times ===
Near Ilaniya, archaeologists discovered the remains of an ancient Jewish settlement. The Arab village of al-Shajarah was later built on top of the remains. The remains of an ancient public structure documented in the late 19th century contained an inscription in Greek and was originally identified as a church or a temple. However, the structure is now thought to have been an ancient synagogue. This conclusion is based on architectural fragments typical of synagogues, such as those found at Capernaum and Bar'am. In addition, a drainage canal near the ancient well was excavated in 1985, where a coin of King Herod Agrippa was discovered.

An ancient burial cave near Ilaniya displays a red-painted menorah on one wall, with above it, indistinct letters in Jewish script that remain unexamined.

=== Modern Jewish settlements ===
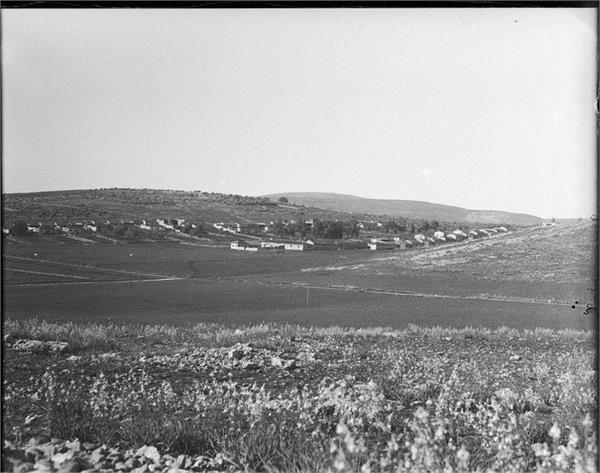
Ilaniya 1937

The agricultural colony of Sejera, later Ilaniya, was established from 1900 to 1902 on land purchased by Baron Edmond James de Rothschild, which was transferred to the management of the Jewish Colonization Association (JCA/ICA) in 1899. That same year, the JCA also bought additional land for its planned colony. The first settlers were residents of Safed, a group of immigrants from Kurdistan, and eight families of Subbotniks (Russian Christians who had converted to Judaism), the Dubrovin family being one of them.

The small settlement founded by JCA had two sections, a sharecroppers' colony for more experienced farmers, and a training farm for unskilled workers. The former consisted of a short street with private houses on both sides with garden plots in front and sheds at the back.

The training farm was located slightly higher up the slope, with a yard enclosed by a wall and single rooms for workers. The overall concept came from JCA official Chaim Margalioth Kalvarisky. The JCA's purpose was to help settle the land with professional Jewish farmers, agriculture being seen as a morally as well as economically sound activity. Unwilling to run their project as a charity organisation in the style of Baron de Rothschild, the JCA leaders in Paris expected the training farm to be self-sufficient and to generate profit. When this did not happen, they replaced Kalvarisky in 1901 with the young agronomist Eliyahu Krause. Since the farm continued losing money, the JCA started in 1906 a process of reducing the administered training farm and gradually transferring its allocated land to the sharecroppers.

Between 1907 and 1908, a socialist commune led by Manya Wilbushewitch and Israel Shochat was contracted to run the farm autonomously for one year, without administrative interference. Wilbushewitch received the support of Yehoshua Hankin, who brought in Eliahu Krause to design an operative plan. The eighteen commune members, young men and women from Sejera and elsewhere in Palestine, aided by a number of sympathisers, managed for the first time to generate a profit and ensure constant employment for all workers of Sejera (with the side effect that outside Arab workers were no longer needed), while also pioneering full equality for women. Along with their work in agriculture there were daily educational meetings where they learned Hebrew from a young man named David Grün (who would go on to become the first prime minister of Israel under the name of David Ben-Gurion), Arabic from an Arab villager, socialist theory from Manya Wilbushewitch, and the latest news from Israel Shochat. Less publicly, the group used Sejera for training the newly constituted Bar-Giora Jewish self-defense organisation, which eventually took over from Circassians and Arabs the guarding duties in Sejera and other nearby Jewish settlements. Manya Wilbushewitch and Israel Shochat married in Sejera in 1908. Ben Gurion worked as a farm hand and later as a guard for 13 months from 1908; at the time Sejera had a population of around 200.

On 12 April 1909 two Jews from Sejera were killed in clashes following the death of a villager from Kfar Kanna, shot in an attempted robbery.

Despite the economic success, JCA did not renew the agreement with the socialist commune at the end of the one-year experiment. By taking what was one of the least profitable ranches in the land and making it profitable, Manya Shochat showed that her ideas for a communal collective could work. This first well-run socialist-Zionist commune in Palestine is counted as an important precursor of the kibbutz movement and one of the nuclei of Jewish rural settlement in Palestine.

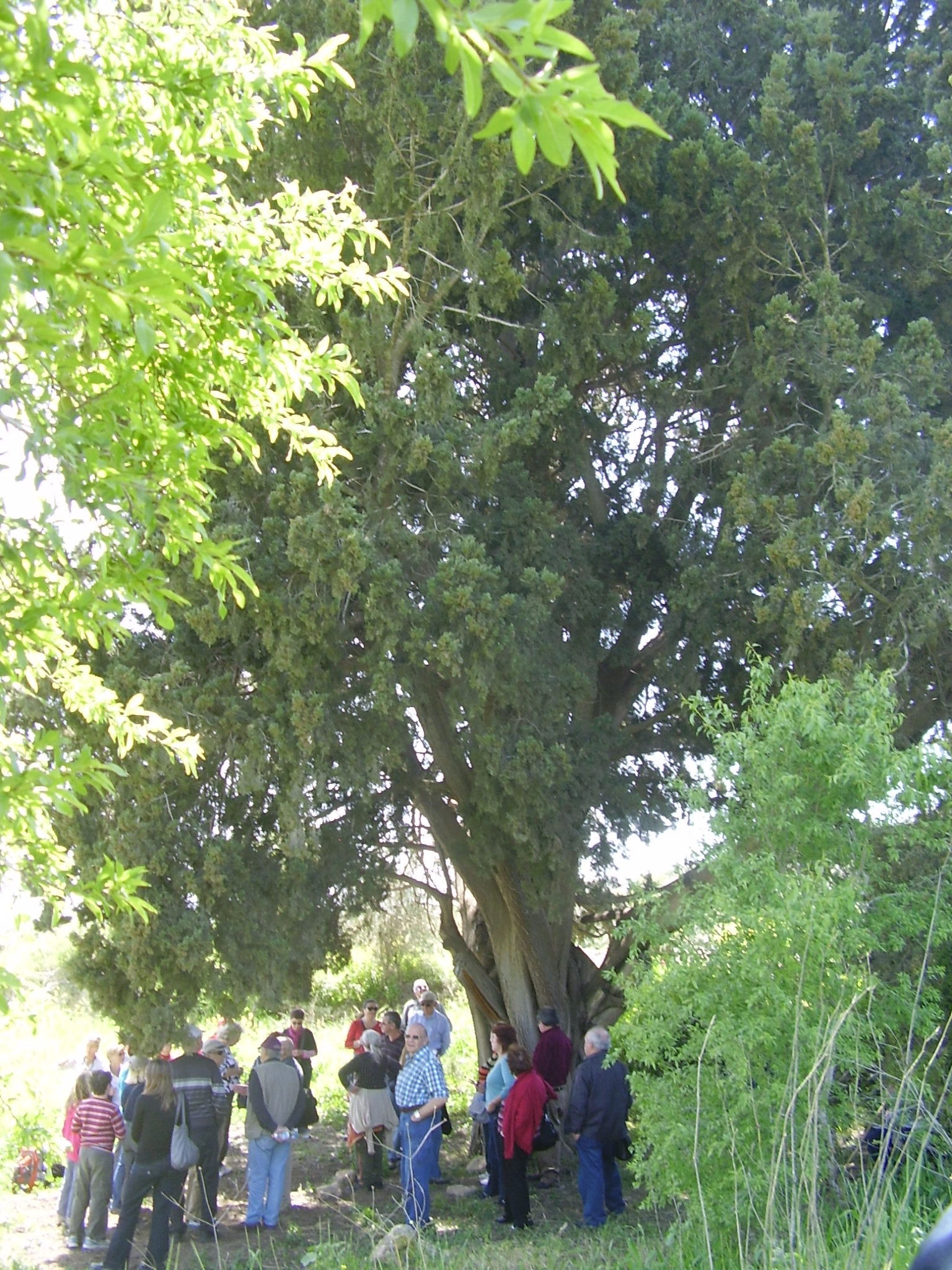
Historic cypress of Sejera

By 1912-1913, the training farm was closed down, its land reallocated to the sharecroppers or sold to a Jewish plantation company. Still, after over a decade of teaching essential skills to agricultural workers, and by bringing together some of the leading pioneers of the First and Second Aliyah who would go on to establish the infrastructure of the pre-state Zionist society, the farm can be said to have played an essential role in the Zionist enterprise.

During the 1948 Arab–Israeli War the village was attacked several times by the Army for the Liberation of Palestine, led by Fawzi al-Qawuqji. Most of the Jewish inhabitants temporarily abandoned the place, while the remaining ones took part in the fighting. By 1949 the settlement expanded near the adjacent Arab village of al-Shajara, which had been depopulated during the war.

At some point Ilaniya became a moshav.

== Landmarks ==
Ilaniya and the Sejera farm are on the list of conserved sites. Some places of note are the old school, founded in 1922; the mikveh tahara in a sepulchral grotto; the house of Naftali Fabrikant, now a library and educational centre; and the ruins of a synagogue from the Byzantine era.

== Notable residents ==
- David Ben Gurion
- Judith Marquet-Krause
