= Second Aliyah =

Period of Jewish immigration to Palestine (1904–1914)

The Second Aliyah (Hebrew: העלייה השנייה, romanized: HaAliyah HaShniya) was an aliyah (Jewish immigration to the Land of Israel) that took place between 1904 and 1914, during which approximately 35,000 Jews, mostly from Russia, with some from Yemen, immigrated into Ottoman Palestine.

The Second Aliyah was a small part of the greater emigration of Jews from Eastern Europe which lasted from the 1870s until the 1920s. During this time, over two million Jews emigrated from Eastern Europe. The majority of these emigrants settled in the United States where there was the greatest economic opportunity. Others settled in South America, Australia, and South Africa.

There are multiple reasons for this mass emigration from Eastern Europe, including the growing antisemitism in Tzarist Russia and the Pale of Settlement. The manifestations of this antisemitism were various pogroms, notably the Kishinev pogrom and the pogroms that attended the 1905 Russian Revolution. The other major factor for emigration was economic hardship. The majority of the Jewish population of Eastern Europe was poor and they left in search of a better life. Jews left Eastern Europe in search of a better economic situation which the majority found in the United States.

The Palestine region on the other hand offered very limited economic incentives for new immigrants, because there was very little industry in the region. Thus, the majority of the Jewish immigrants found a livelihood through working the land. Many of the European Jewish immigrants during the late 19th-early 20th century period gave up after a few months and went back to their country of origin, often suffering from hunger and disease. David Ben-Gurion estimated that "90% of the Second Aliyah despaired of the country and left”.

== Settlement ==
Many of the Second Aliyah immigrants were idealists inspired by the revolutionary ideals then sweeping the Russian Empire and sought to establish agricultural settlements; others were evading conscription into the Tzarist Russian army. In 1906 there were 13 Jewish agricultural settlements established with financial support from the Jewish Colonisation Association, a philanthropic organization founded by Baron Maurice de Hirsch in 1891. In 1907 it is estimated there were 550 active pioneers. The first kibbutz, Degania, was founded in 1909.

Most of those arriving were married, many with children; 40% were women. Few had any resources and many remained destitute. Some of the immigrants, such as Akiva Aryeh Weiss, who preferred to settle in the new district created Ahuzat Bayit near Jaffa, which was later re named as Tel Aviv. In 1914 it had a Jewish population of 2,000.

As opposed to the first Aliyah where almost all Jews were agricultural workers, many Jews found jobs as silversmiths, constructions workers and other professions.

== Wider immigration and Zionism ==
There is a large misconception that Zionism played a major role in the immigration of Jews to Ottoman Syria (later British Palestine) during The Second Aliyah. While Zionism may have had some influence, it cannot be viewed as a substantial factor of influencing emigration to Ottoman Syria when looking at the greater context of Jewish emigration from Eastern Europe. The two major reasons for Jewish emigration were poverty and persecution, and Ottoman Syria did not offer a respite from either. Jews emigrating from Eastern Europe often experienced much hardship on their way to their destinations, especially those going to the Palestine region. Ottoman government had been negative to the migration of Jews ("Yishuv") to Palestine from late 19th century till the end of World War I. One of the reasons was that most of the Jews had foreign citizenship, which curtailed the Empire's ability to deal with them and enforce Ottoman law. Expulsions, deportations, arrests, denial of Ottoman nationality were some of the measures used to contain the Jewish immigration. Among the deportees were David Ben-Gurion and Yitzhak Ben-Zvi.

The idea that the Second Aliyah was a realization of the zionist movement does not take all the hardships endured by the immigrants into account. Because of this, the majority of Jewish emigrants went to the United States where there was much more economic opportunity. Between the years 1907-1914 almost 1.5 million Jews went through Ellis Island, while only about 20,000 immigrated to Palestine.

One of Ben Gurion's biographers states that there were only a few hundred idealists like Ben Gurion, totaling fewer than half the number of Templers living in Palestine at the time.

== Culture ==
During the Second Aliyah, the process of reviving the Hebrew language continued, with the language being used more often in public assemblies and conferences, but not yet in the private sphere. In the early years, many people were still not fluent in Hebrew, and Yiddish plays proved more popular than Hebrew lectures; however, the younger generation made Hebrew into a spoken language. In this period, Ya'acov Ben-Dov became the first filmmaker to work in Hebrew. Also, the first Hebrew high school was established in Israel, the Herzliya Hebrew High School in Tel Aviv.

Prior to the First World War it is estimated that more than 40,000 of the Jews in Palestine held Russian citizenship. This influx of immigration led to an increased presence of Russian culture and Russian political machines in Israel.

== Defense ==
The Second Aliyah created the security organization, HaShomer, which became the precedent for future Jewish defense organizations such as the Haganah, and eventually becoming the Israel Defense Forces.

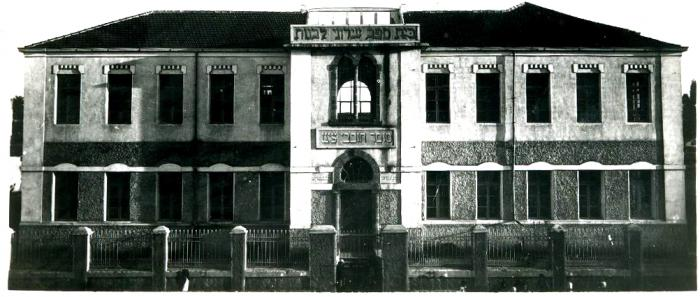
The girls' school in Neve Tzedek, 1909

== Education ==
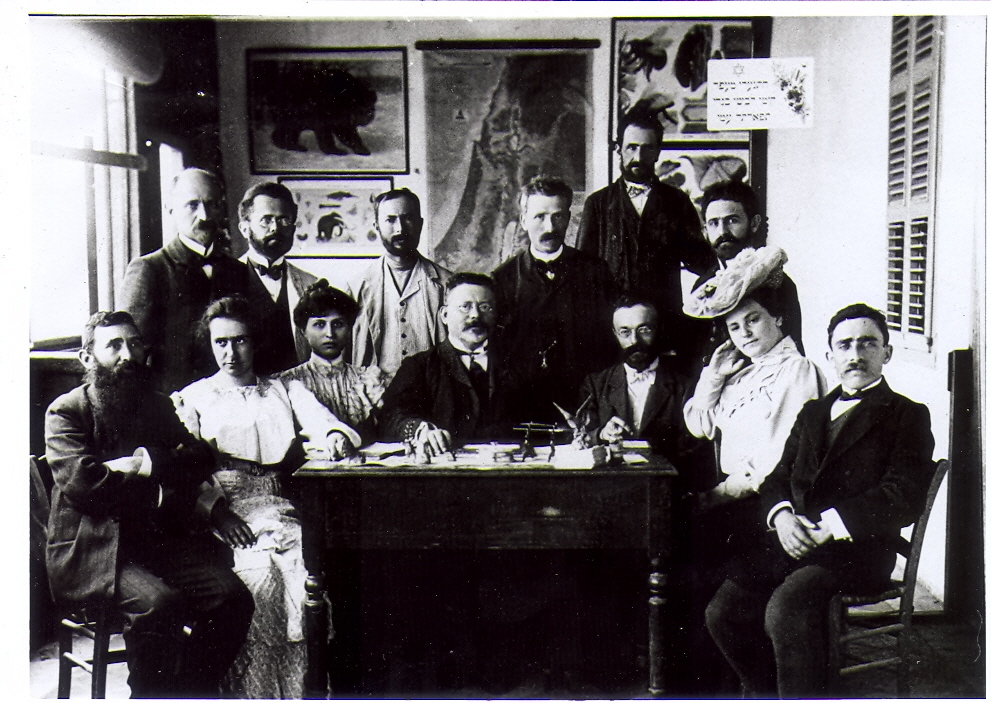
The first staff of the girls school in Neve Tzedek, 1905, including: Tsina Dizengoff, Panchasovitz,Eliezer Hoofien, Mordechai Ezrachi, Eliezer Pepper, S. Ben-Zion, Shechnai, Yehiel Yehieli

The new Jewish settlement embarked on linguistic and cultural independence. The expansion of the Jewish settlement led to the development of the education system and changes in the curricula. New educational institutions were established, from kindergartens to a teachers' seminary, the David Yellin Teachers' College, a Hebrew school for girls established by the Hovevei Zion in Jaffa in 1909, and the Reali School in Haifa. Some of the new institutions received support from the "Kol Yisrael Chaverim" and "Ezra" societies. Hebrew education and education for national values also developed under the influence of Ahad Ha'Am and the Hovevei Zion. At the end of the "Language War" – the debate over the language of instruction following the decision to teach in German at the Technion – Hebrew emerged victorious as the everyday spoken language, as well as the language of academia. As a result, a network of Hebrew education developed under the auspices of a public committee with national-Zionist values. In the struggle for the Hebrew language, the "Hebrew Union" was established, whose founders championed the principle of the "naturalness" of Hebrew in the Land of Israel and the imperative of its "revival".

== See also ==
- First Aliyah, 1881–1903
- Third Aliyah, 1919–1923 (after the First World War and until the 1923 economic crisis)
