= The Roaring Lion (sculpture) =

Memorial sculpture in northern Israel

- האריה השואג (Hebrew)
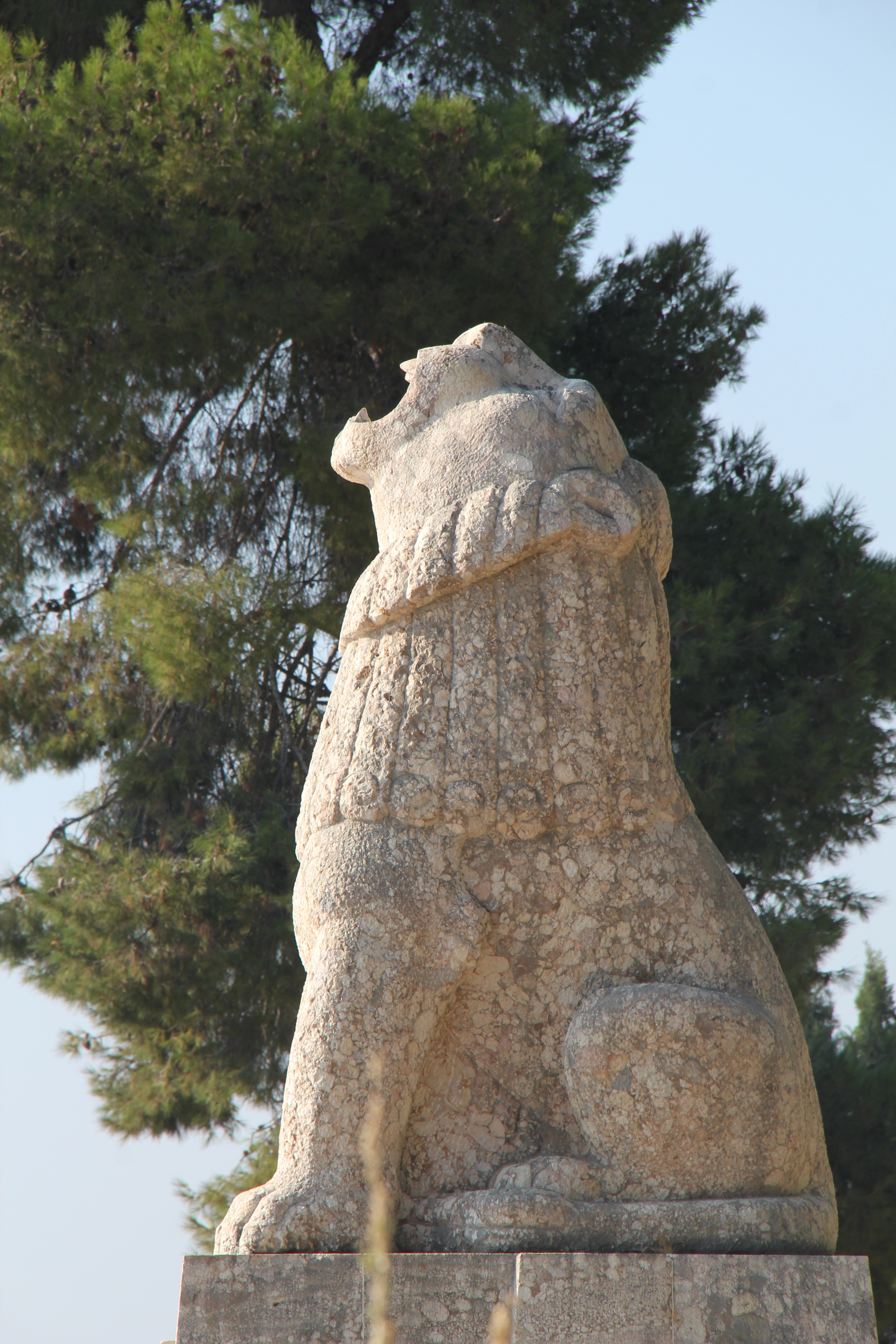
- Artist: Avraham Melnikov
- Completion date: 23 February 1934
- Medium: Sculpture
- Location: Kfar Giladi–Tel Hai Cemetery; 33°14′19″N 35°34′36″E

The Roaring Lion (Hebrew: האריה השואג, romanized: ha'Arye haSho'eg) is a sculpture at the Kfar Giladi–Tel Hai Cemetery in the Upper Galilee region of northern Israel. It is an official symbol of the Tel-Hai University of Kiryat Shmona in the Galilee.

== Background ==
=== Commissioning ===
The sculpture, commissioned by Alfred Mond as a memorial to the Jewish defenders of the Battle of Tel Hai, was designed by Avraham Melnikov.

== Design and history ==
The statue was unveiled at a ceremony on 23 February 1934 attended by community leaders from the Yishuv and members of the neighbouring kibbutz Kfar Giladi.

In 2024, fires caused by Hezbollah rocket attacks scorched the fields surrounding the statue, but it was undamaged.

== Depictions ==
The Roaring Lion has appeared on Israeli stamps, coins, and posters.

== See also ==
- Lion of Judah
- Arat Kilo Monument
- Monument to the Lion of Judah
