= Avraham Melnikov =

Israeli sculptor (1892 – 1960)

Avraham Melnikov אברהם מלניקוב
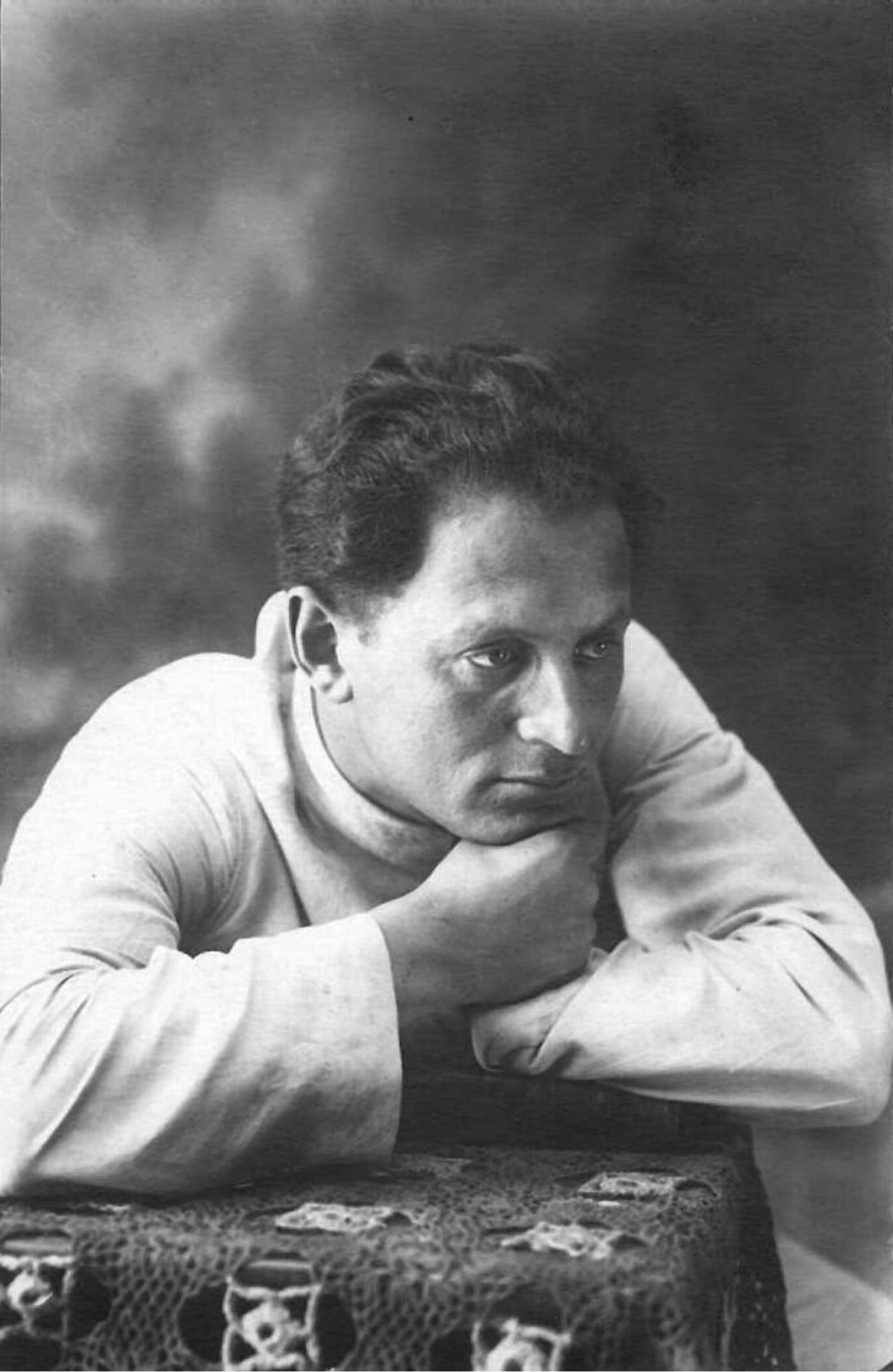
- Born: June 16, 1892; Sokyriany, Bessarabia Governorate, Russian Empire
- Died: August 27, 1960 (aged 68); Haifa, Israel
- Known for: Sculpture
- Notable work: Roaring Lion, Kfar Giladi Cemetery
- Movement: Land of Israel movement

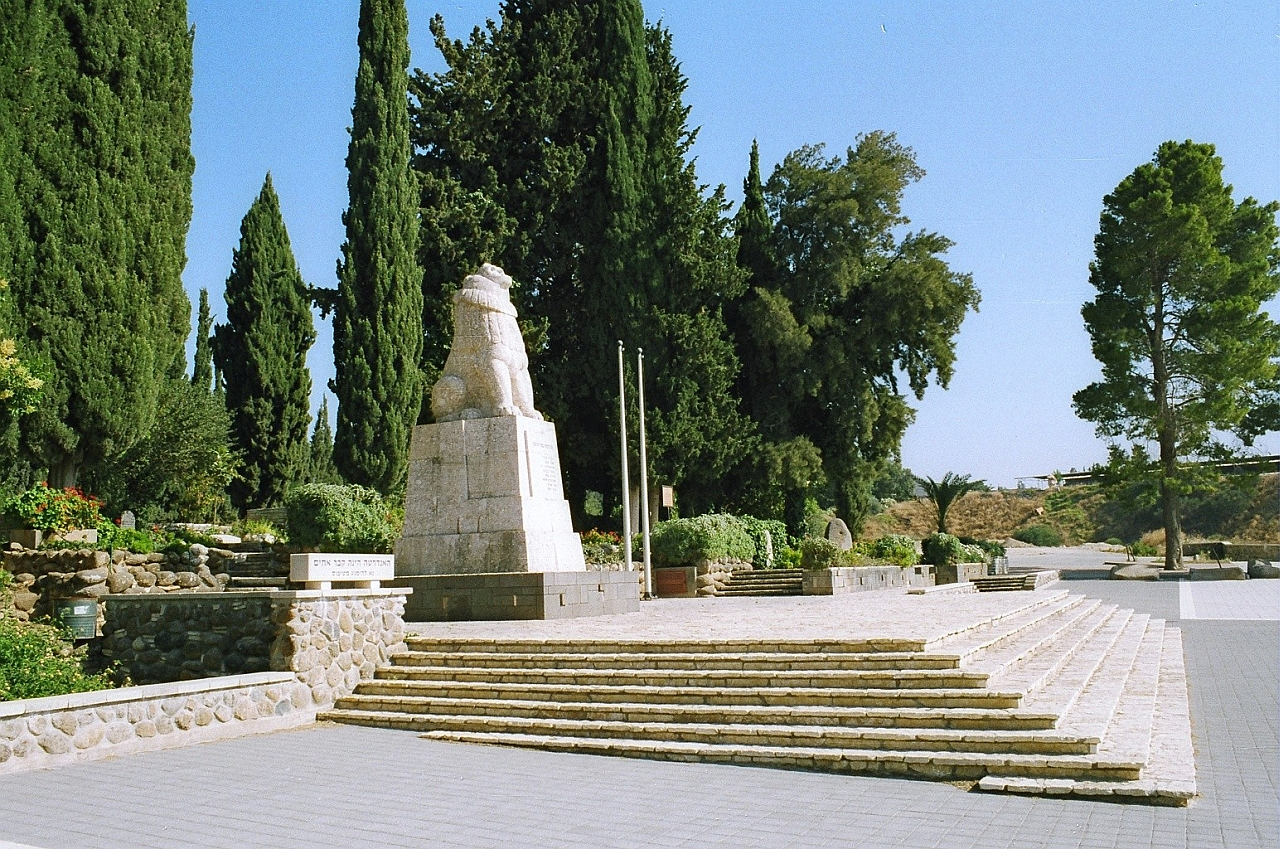
Roaring Lion, Kfar Giladi Cemetery

Avraham Melnikov (Hebrew: אברהם מלניקוב; June 16, 1892 – August 27, 1960) was a sculptor especially notable during the period of the Yishuv. His most famous work is the monument "The Roaring Lion" at the Kfar Giladi Cemetery in Tel Hai.

== Biography ==
=== Early life ===
He was born in Bessarabia in 1892. He immigrated to Palestine in 1918 as a soldier in the Jewish Legion. He began engaging with the art of sculpture from a young age. Following the British capture of Beersheba, he created a statue of General Edmund Allenby, which was placed in a municipal garden in Beersheba. The statue was destroyed during the 1936–1939 Arab revolt in Palestine.

=== Art style ===
Melnikov participated in the Tower of David exhibitions, which took place annually in the 1920s and expressed the spirit of Hebrew art emerging in the Land of Israel. He created a unique style that combined a connection to the roots of the Jewish people with a primitive primordiality, distant from the European heritage, influenced by ancient Assyrian sculpture. This was in contrast with the modern art trends of the Ecole de Paris-influenced art, brought by Isaac Frenkel Frenel.

=== Artistic career in Eretz Israel ===
Melnikov was elected to the first committee of the Association of Painters and Sculptors in the Land of Israel, alongside Joseph Zaritsky and Reuven Rubin.

In 1925, Melnikov arrived in the Galilee and met with members of the Haganah under the leadership of Yitzhak Sadeh. When he saw the unmarked and exposed graves of the fallen from the 1920 Battle of Tel Hai, he proposed erecting a large-scale sculpture as a memorial. The workers of the Haganah carved a massive stone and dragged it to the burial site. Boris Schatz, the founder of "Bezalel", organized fundraising that helped Melnikov with the costs of creating the monument. For several years, Melnikov labored on the sculpture and created the Roaring Lion monument, which became a national symbol. The monument was officially inaugurated in a ceremony on the 7th of Adar, 22 February 1934.

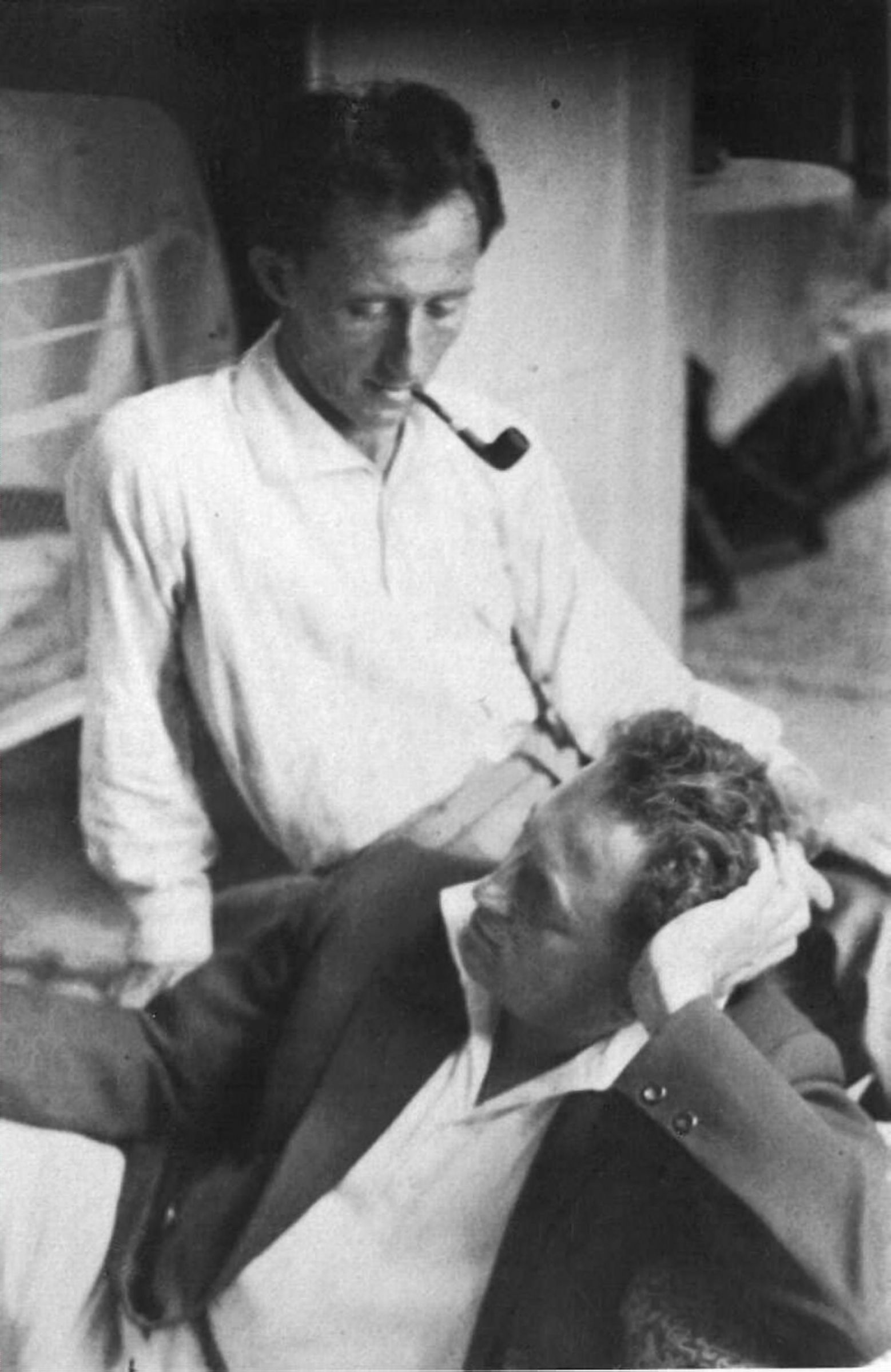
Abraham Melnikov with expressionist poet Uri Zvi Greenberg

=== England ===
In the 1930s, Melnikov left the Land of Israel for England, however, he did not achieve success and recognition for his art. In London, he sculpted famous personalities, including Arturo Toscanini, Lady Melchett and her son, the statesmen Ernest Bevin and Winston Churchill, Lord Conway of Allington, Sarah Churchill, the writer Gilbert Murray, and others. Most of his "English" sculptures (around two hundred) were destroyed in an air raid by the German Luftwaffe during World War II in 1940–41. Only a photograph remains of the sculpture "The Ethiopian Jesus" (plaster, 1949–48), as well as the terracotta sculpture "The Beggar" (date unknown) and the bust of the Yiddish poet Malka Locker (plaster, 1936).

In 1959, he returned to Israel and died in Haifa a year later, aged 68. He was buried alongside his wife, Charlotte Leib Neusenholz (who died in 1949), in Kfar Giladi, near the base of his famous creation, the Roaring Lion monument. He was survived by his daughter.

His statue, "Judah Arising" is in Ramat Gan National Park.

His archive is stored in the National Library of Israel.

== Gallery ==
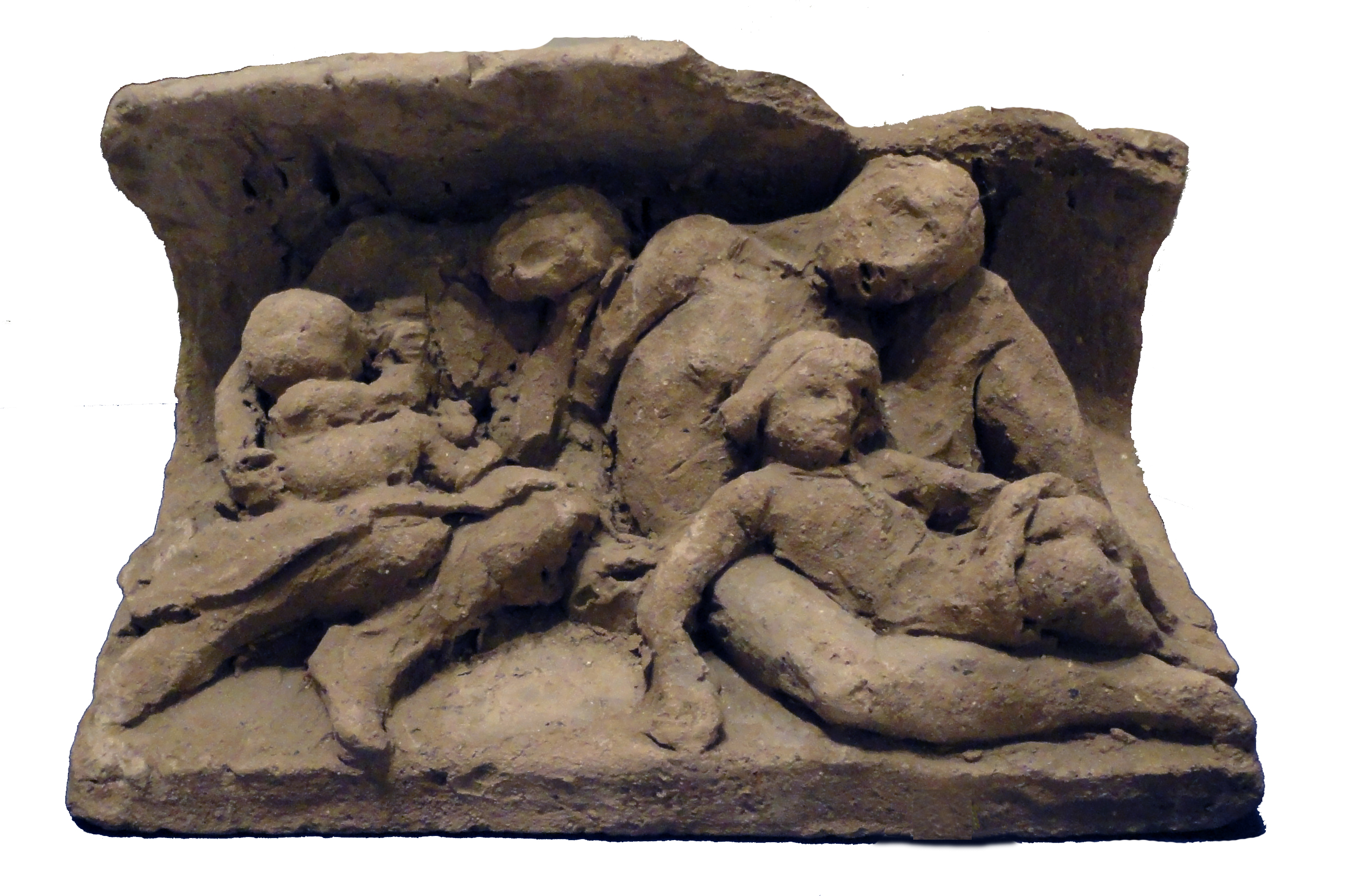
Kedem, people hiding in the underground

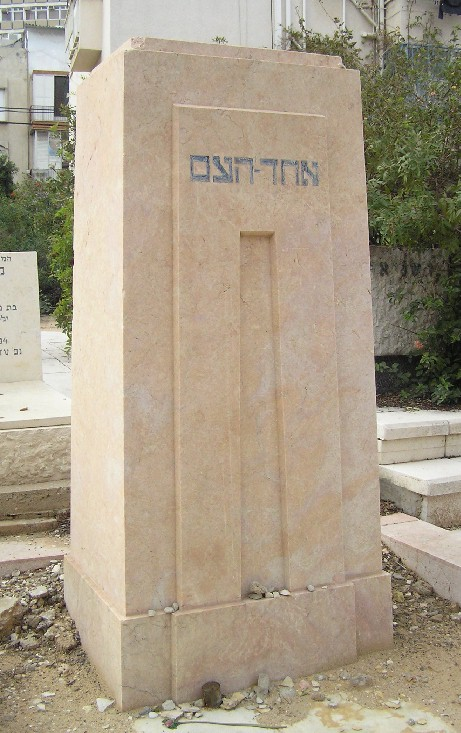
Ahad Ha'am tomb, Trumpeldor Cemetery

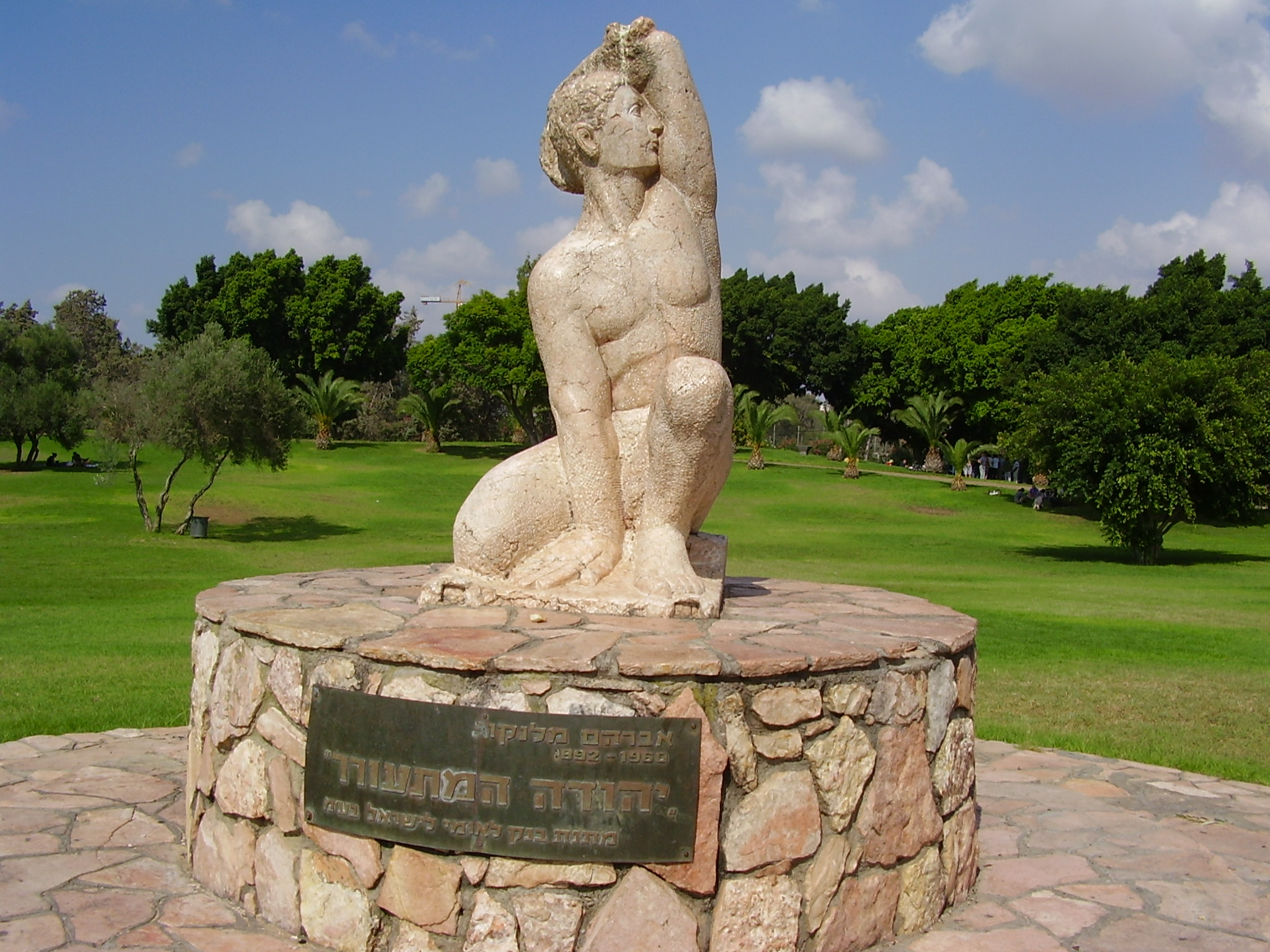
"Judah Arising", Ramat Gan National Park

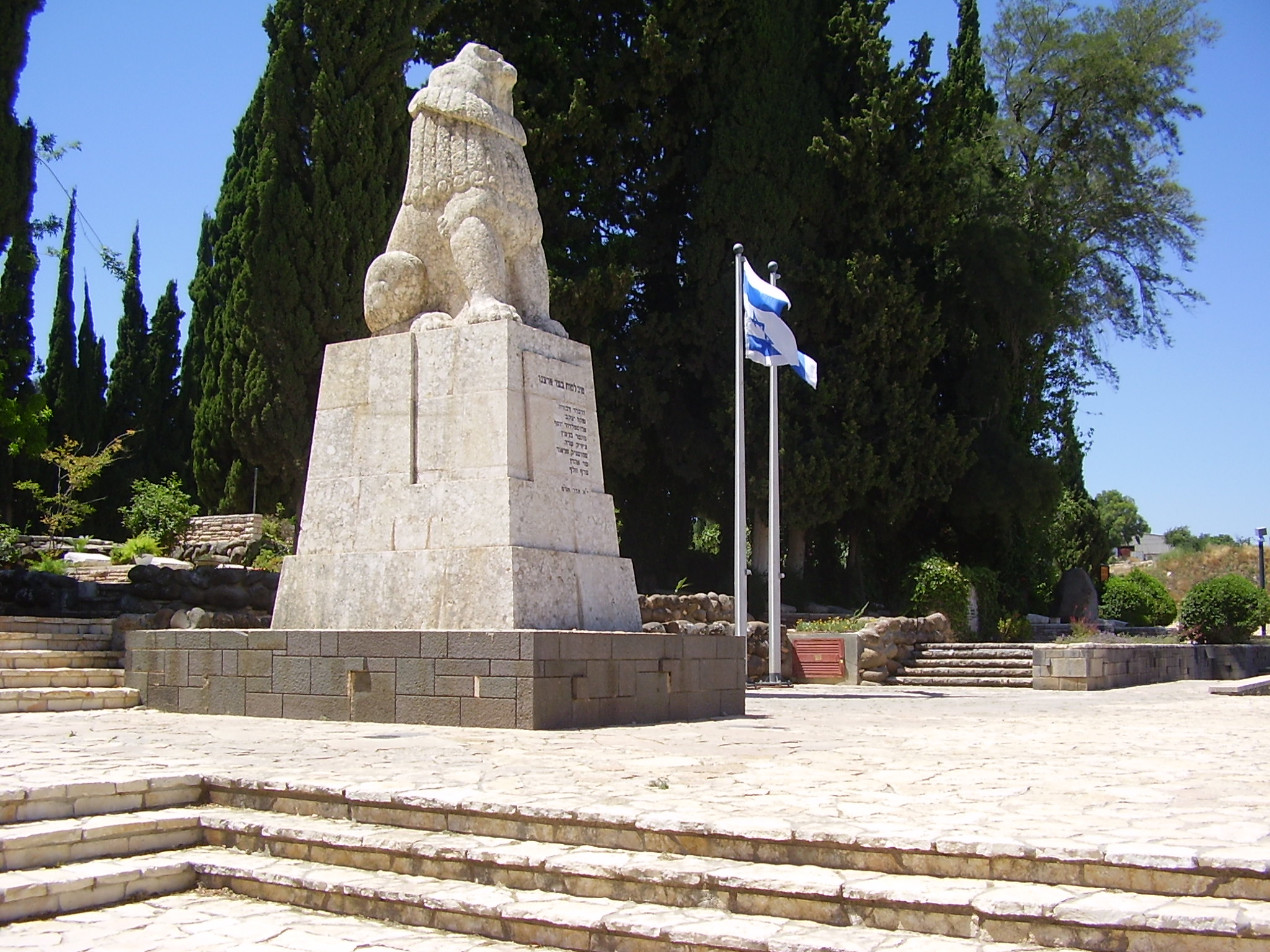
The Roaring Lion, Kfar Giladi
