= Battle of Tel Hai =

1920 battle

- Part of the intercommunal conflict in Mandatory Palestine and the Franco-Syrian War
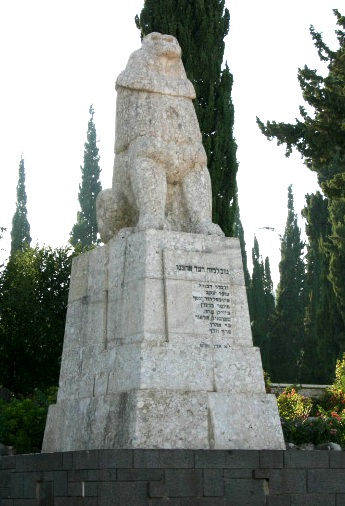
- The Lion of Judah, by Avraham Melnikov - Joseph Trumpeldor's memorial in Tel Hai
Date	March 1, 1920
Location	Tel Hai, Occupied Enemy Territory Administration (modern-day Kfar Giladi, Israel)
Result	Arab victory

Belligerents
Yishuv militia	Syrian Arab Kingdom; Arab Shia militia

Commanders and leaders
Joseph Trumpeldor †	Kamil Husayn Effendi

Strength
Dozens	Hundreds

Casualties and losses
8 killed (including two killed in a previous probing attack)	5 killed

The Battle of Tel Hai was fought on 1 March 1920 between Arab and Jewish forces at the village of Tel Hai in Northern Galilee. In the course of the event, a Shiite Arab militia, accompanied by Bedouin from a nearby village, entered the Jewish agricultural locality of Tel Hai in search of French soldiers, believing that the Jews were allied with the French and protecting their forces. Confusion over the presence of the militias subsequently led to shots being fired and a firefight breaking out. In the aftermath of the fighting, eight Jews and five Arabs were killed. Joseph Trumpeldor, the commander of Jewish defenders of Tel Hai, was shot in the hand and stomach, and died while being evacuated to Kfar Giladi that evening. Tel Hai was eventually abandoned by the Jews and burned by the Arab militia.

The event is perceived by some scholars as part of the Franco-Syrian War and by some as an outbreak of violence in the later developing intercommunal conflict in Mandatory Palestine.

== Background ==
Tel Hai had been established in 1905 as part of the Jewish community of Metulla and was permanently settled as a Jewish border outpost and small kibbutz in 1918 by the Hashomer organization, following the defeat of the Ottoman Empire in World War I. The area was subsequently subject to intermittent border adjustments between the British and the French. The Franco-Syrian War took place in early 1920 between Syrian Arab nationalists, under the Hashemite King, and France. Gangs ( 'isabat) of clan-based border peasants, combining politics and banditry, were active in the area of the loosely defined border between the soon to be established Mandatory Palestine and the French-controlled Mandate for Syria and the Lebanon.

Joseph Trumpeldor had served as an officer in the Russian Army during the Russian-Japanese War of 1905, being one of the few Russian Jews to gain a commission under the Tsar. He had also commanded a Jewish auxiliary unit fighting together with the British Army during the Gallipoli Campaign of the First World War. As such, he was a well experienced military man, whom the Zionist movement could send to command the threatened outpost.

== Timeline ==
=== Franco-Syrian War ===
At the beginning of the Franco-Syrian War, the Upper Galilee was populated by several semi-nomadic Bedouin Arab tribes, the largest residing in Halasa, and four tiny Jewish settlements, including Metula, Kfar Giladi, Tel Hai and Hamra. While the Arab villages and Bedouin allied with the Arab Kingdom of Syria, the Jewish residents chose to remain neutral during the Arab conflict with the French.

Early in the war, a Kfar Giladi resident was killed by armed Bedouin, greatly increasing tension in the region. Jewish villages were regularly pillaged by the pro-Syrian Bedouin on the pretext of searching for French spies and soldiers. In one incident, Trumpeldor and other Jews were stripped of their clothes as a public insult by an Arab Bedouin militia.

=== Battle ===
On March 1, 1920, several hundred Shiite Arabs from the village of Jabal Amil in southern Lebanon marched to the gates of Tel Hai together with Bedouin from Al-Khalisa and their Mukhtar, Kamal Affendi. They demanded to search Tel Hai for French soldiers, which the residents of Tel Hai believed was a ruse to get them to abandon the community. One of the farmers fired a shot into the air, a signal for reinforcements from nearby Kfar Giladi, which brought ten men led by Trumpeldor, who had been posted by Hashomer to organize defense. Joseph Trumpeldor and his ten men attempted to negotiate and convince the Shiites and roving village militias to leave.

Kamal Affendi was allowed to enter the village to search for French soldiers. He encountered one of the female Jewish residents named Deborah who pointed a pistol at Kamal, apparently surprised to see an armed Bedouin in the village. A shot was discharged during the struggle (unclear whether from the pistol or by another weapon) and a major firefight erupted, in which Trumpeldor was shot and seriously wounded. Afterwards, the sides barricaded themselves in the village. Kamal Affendi asked to leave, saying it was all a misunderstanding, and the Jewish force approved the cease-fire. During the Arab retreat, one of the Jewish defenders, unaware of the agreements by his comrades and hearing-impaired by the previous firefight, shot at the Arab party, and the exchange of fire recommenced.

Six Jews and five Arabs were killed in the fighting, among them two American volunteers who had fought with the Jewish Legion on behalf of British Army during World War I. Trumpeldor was shot in the hand and stomach and died while being evacuated to Kfar Giladi that evening. The survivors of Tel Hai found their position untenable and had no choice but to withdraw, whereupon the Arabs set fire to the village.

== Aftermath ==
The eight Jews killed at Tel Hai (this number including two killed in a previous probing attack in January 1920) were buried in two common graves in Kfar Giladi, and both locations were abandoned for a time.

On 3 March, Kfar Giladi was also attacked by a large group of Bedouin. The defenders abandoned the position and retreated to the Shia village of Taibe where they were given shelter and an escort to Ayelet Hashahar, which was under British control.

The Franco-Syrian War entered its last stages in July 1920, with the defeat of Hashemite loyalists in the Battle of Maysalun. The border in the area of Upper Galilee was finally agreed between the British and the French, and this area was to be included in Mandatory Palestine. It was thus possible for Tel Hai to be resettled in 1921, though it did not become a viable independent community and in 1926 was absorbed into the kibbutz of Kfar Giladi.

With a national monument in Upper Galilee, Israel commemorates the deaths of eight Jews, six men and two women, including Joseph Trumpeldor. The memorial is best known for an emblematic statue of a roaring lion representing Trumpeldor and his comrades. The city of Kiryat Shemona, literally Town of the Eight was named after them.

The man who had led the attack, Kemal Hussein, later represented the Jewish National Fund when it purchased land for Kibbutz Dafna in 1939.

== Significance ==
Idith Zertal has written that it marked 'the dramatic initiation of the violent conflict over Palestine.'

=== Trumpeldor's heritage ===
Trumpeldor was severely wounded in the battle, and died within several hours. According to Zionist folklore, his last words were "Doesn't matter, it is good to die (tov lamut) for our country" ("אין דבר, טוב למות בעד ארצנו"). The phrase is still closely associated both with Trumpeldor as an individual as well as with the Battle Tel Hai. However, in the 1990s a different theory has emerged, arguing that Trumpeldor's last words were, in fact, a pungent curse in his mother-tongue Russian, reflecting frustration with his bad luck, namely 'Fuck your mother' ((Yob tvoyú mat'),:ёб твою мать!).

The phrase that has been attributed to Trumpeldor as his last words is a variant of the well known saying "Dulce et decorum est pro patria mori" ("It is sweet and fitting to die for one's country"), derived from the Odes of the Roman poet Horace. It is a quotation with which Trumpeldor, as other educated Europeans of the time, may have been familiar.

== See also ==
- 1920 Nebi Musa riots
- 1929 Palestine riots
- 1933 Palestine riots
- 1936–39 Arab revolt in Palestine
- 1938 Tiberias massacre
- Jaffa riots
- Sykes–Picot Agreement
