= Lion of Judah =

Jewish national and cultural symbol

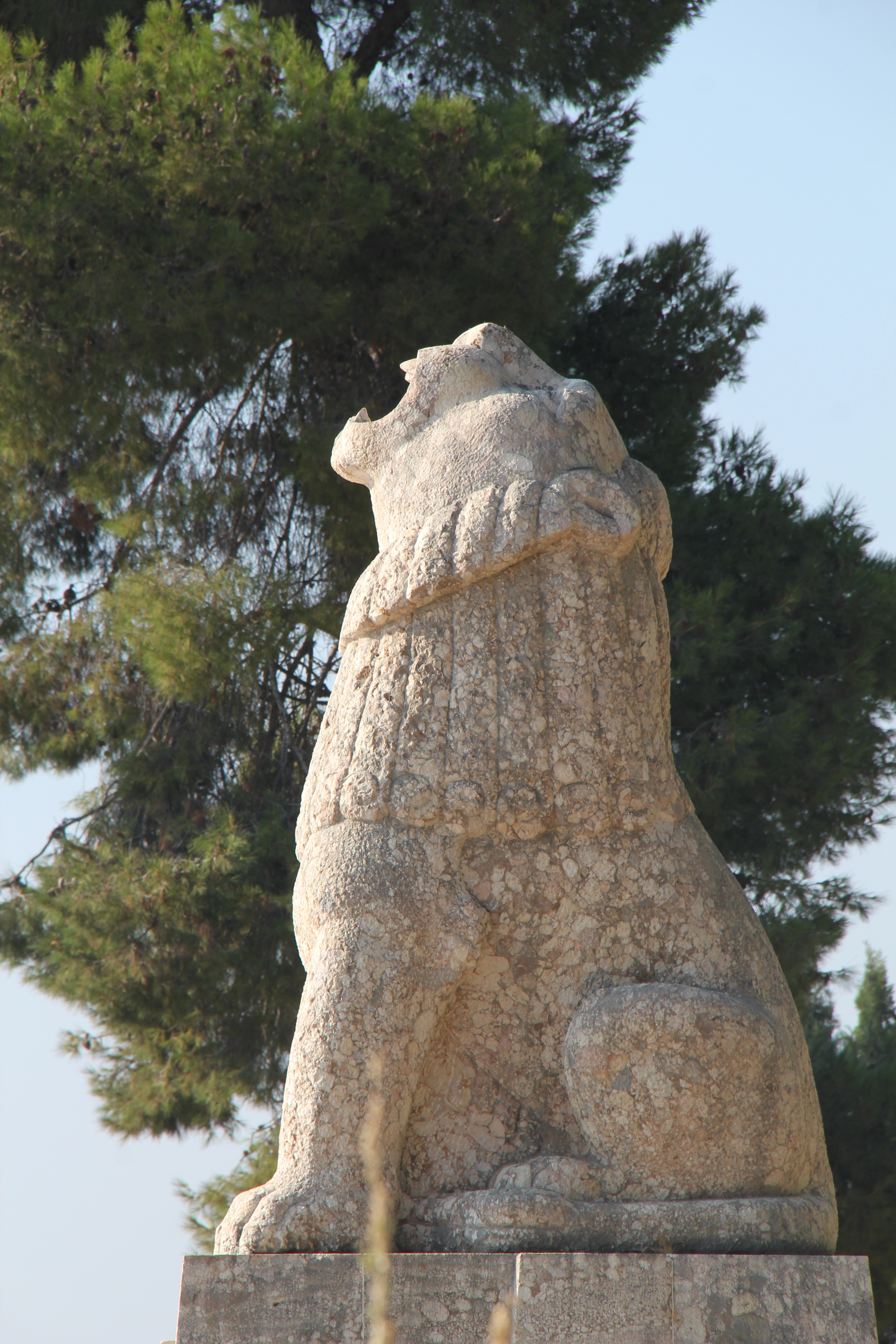
The Roaring Lion sculpture in Israel

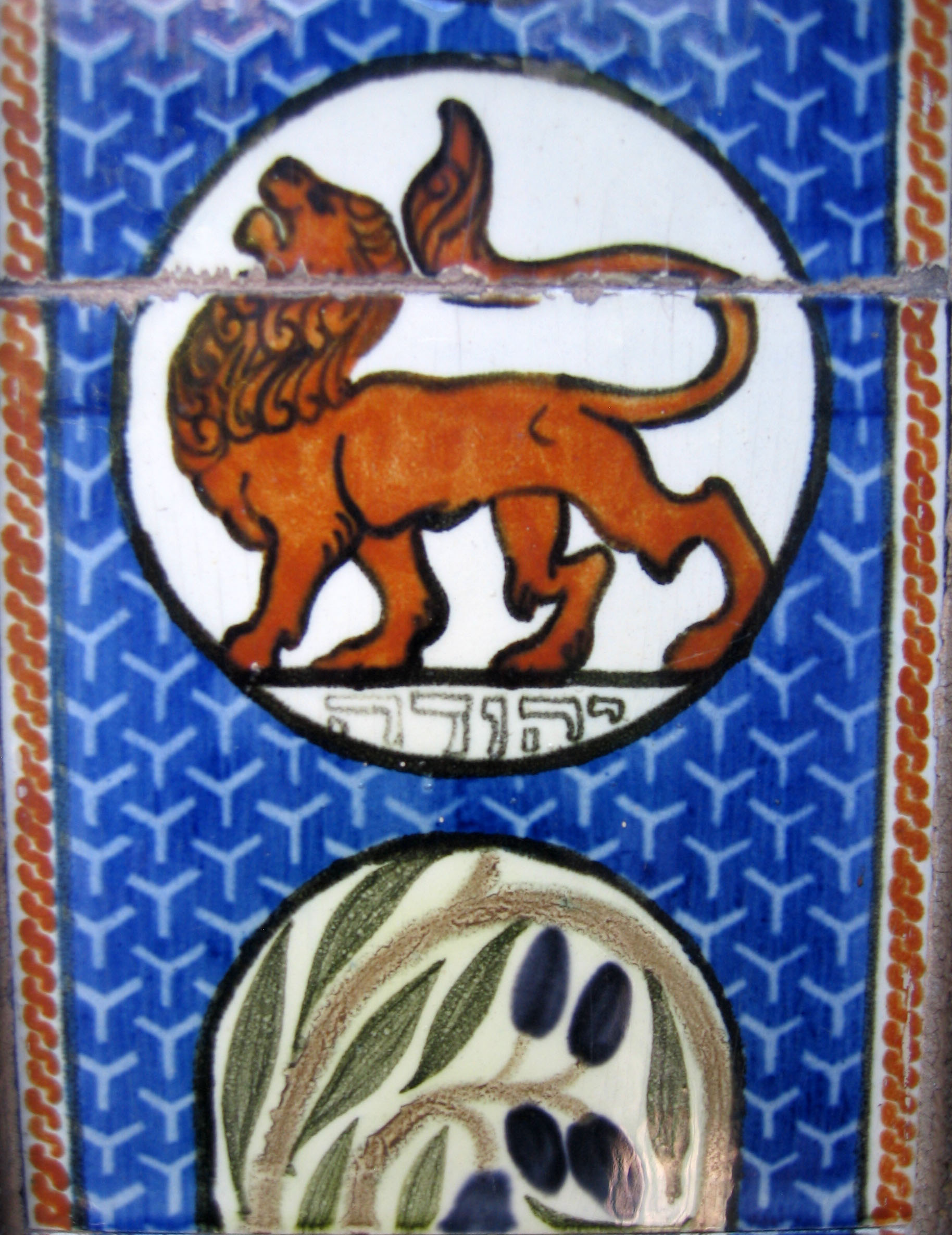
The Lion of Judah on a Bezalel ceramic tile

The Lion of Judah (Hebrew: אריה יהודה, romanized: Aryeh Yehudah; Greek: Λιοντάρι του Ιούδα, romanized: Liontári tou Ioúda; Latin: Leo Iuda; Amharic: የይሁዳ አንበሳ, romanized: Yeyihuda Ānibesa) is a Jewish national and cultural symbol, traditionally regarded as the symbol of the tribe of Judah. The association between the Judahites and the lion can first be found in the blessing given by Jacob to his fourth son, Judah, in the Book of Genesis of the Hebrew Bible.

It is also mentioned in the Book of Revelation of the New Testament as a term representing Jesus of Nazareth, according to Christian theology. The Lion of Judah was also one of the titles used by Ethiopian emperors from the Solomonic dynasty.

== History ==
=== Judaism ===
Emblem of Jerusalem

The biblical Judah (in Hebrew: Yehuda) is the eponymous ancestor of the Tribe of Judah, which is traditionally symbolized by a lion. In Genesis, the patriarch Jacob ("Israel") gave that symbol to this tribe when he refers to his son Judah as a Gur Aryeh' גּוּר אַרְיֵה יְהוּדָה, "Young Lion" (Genesis 49:9) when blessing him. In Jewish naming tradition the Hebrew name and the substitute name are often combined as a pair, as in this case. The Lion of Judah was used as a Jewish symbol for many years, and as Jerusalem was the capital of the Kingdom of Judah, in 1950 it was included in the Emblem of Jerusalem.

=== Christianity ===
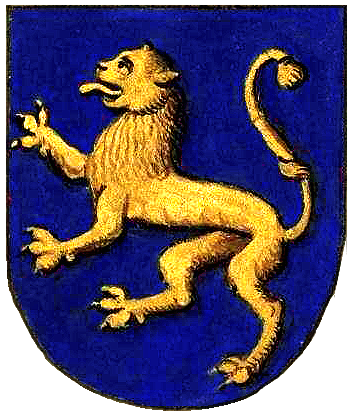
Lion of Judah ("Thesouro de Nobreza", 1675)

The phrase appears in the New Testament in Revelation 5:5:

Then one of the elders said to me, "Do not weep. See, the Lion of the tribe of Judah, the Root of David, has conquered, so that he can open the scroll and its seven seals."

This is widely regarded as a reference to the Second Coming among Christians.

Many Christian organizations and ministries use the lion of Judah as their emblem or even as their names.

=== Ethiopia ===
Imperial Flag of Haile Selassie of Ethiopia with the Lion of Judah, cross scepter, 36 Stars of David and the words "Conquering Lion of the Tribe of Judah" in Amharic

It was depicted on a map of the Upper Nile published in 1683 by the German Hiob Ludolf describing the Lion of Judah symbol as the royal insignia of the Ethiopian Empire. The Solomonic dynasty of Ethiopia claims to have its patrilineal origin in the Israelite Royal House of Judah. The Lion of Judah served as the hereditary title of the Solomonic Ethiopian emperors and nobles including Sabagadis Woldu, Kenfu Hailu, Wube Haile Mariam, Tewodros II, Yohannes IV, Menelik, and Haile Selassie and was depicted on the flag of Ethiopia from 1897 to 1974. Due to its association with Haile Selassie, it continues to be an important symbol among members of the Rastafari movement.

The Lion of Judah motif figured prominently on the old imperial flag, currency, stamps, etc. and may still be seen gracing the terrace of the capital as a national symbol. After the collapse of the Derg in 1990, a minor political party bearing the name Mo'a Anbessa' made its appearance.

==== Kebra Nagast ====
Ethiopia's history as recorded and elaborated in a 13th-century treatise, the Kebra Nagast, asserts descent from a retinue of Israelites who returned with Makeda, the Queen of Sheba from her visit to King Solomon in Jerusalem, by whom she had conceived the Solomonic dynasty's founder Menelik I. As Solomon was of the tribe of Judah, his son Menelik I would continue the line, which according to Ethiopian history was passed directly down from king to king until Emperor Haile Selassie I (ostensibly the 225th king from King David) was deposed in 1974.

Both Christian and Jewish Ethiopian history have it that there were also immigrants of the Tribes of Dan and Judah that accompanied Makeda back from her visit to Solomon; hence the Ge'ez motto Mo`a 'Anbessa Ze'imnegede Yihuda ("The Lion of Judah has conquered"), included among the titles of the Emperor throughout the Solomonic Dynasty.

=== Rastafari ===
The Lion of Judah is a prominent symbol in the Rastafari movement. It represents Emperor Haile Selassie I as well as being a symbol of strength, kingship, pride and African sovereignty. Rastafari consider the mention of "The Lion of Judah" in Genesis 49:9 and Revelation 5:5 of the Bible to refer to Emperor Haile Selassie I. Rastafari hail Haile Selassie I with the titles "King of kings, lord of lords, conquering Lion of Judah, elect of God, the light of the world".

== In literature ==
Inspired by the Lion of Judah, C. S. Lewis used a lion named Aslan to represent Jesus in The Chronicles of Narnia.

== See also ==
- Monument to the Lion of Judah, a historic statue in Ethiopia
