= Kfar Giladi–Tel Hai Cemetery =

- בית הקברות כפר גלעדי–תל חי
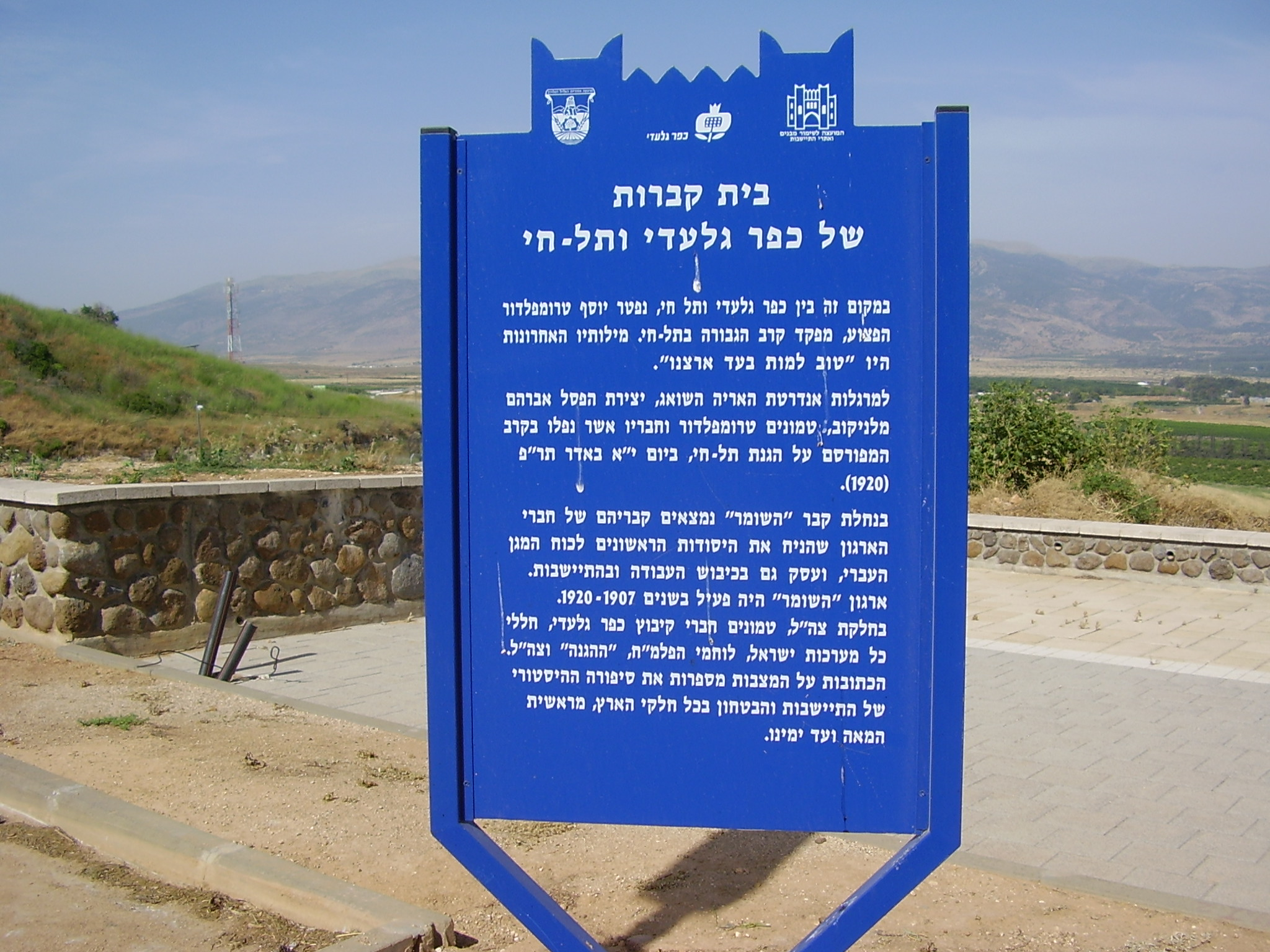
- Interactive map of Kfar Giladi–Tel Hai Cemetery

Details
- Established: 1920
- Country: Israel
- Coordinates: 33°14′19″N 35°34′35″E
- Type: Jewish

The Kfar Giladi–Tel Hai Cemetery is located near the Kfar Giladi kibbutz and close to the Tel Hai site in the Galilee panhandle, in northern Israel. This historic cemetery is the final resting place for many pioneers of settlement and defense in the Land of Israel. It is especially known for the Roaring Lion statue and the section dedicated to members of the Hashomer organization located within it.

The Israel National Trail passes near the cemetery, and since 2021, it starts there.

== Cemetery ==
The cemetery was founded in 1920, four years after the establishment of the Kfar Giladi and Tel Hai. Two Tel Hai members who fell in battle, Shneur Shapushnik and Aharon Sher, were buried there. Israel Giladi proposed the cemetery's location. In 1924, the first civilian was buried in the cemetery. The kibbutz members' plots are situated in the western and southwestern parts of the cemetery grounds. The entire area is surrounded by rows of trees on three sides, except the east.

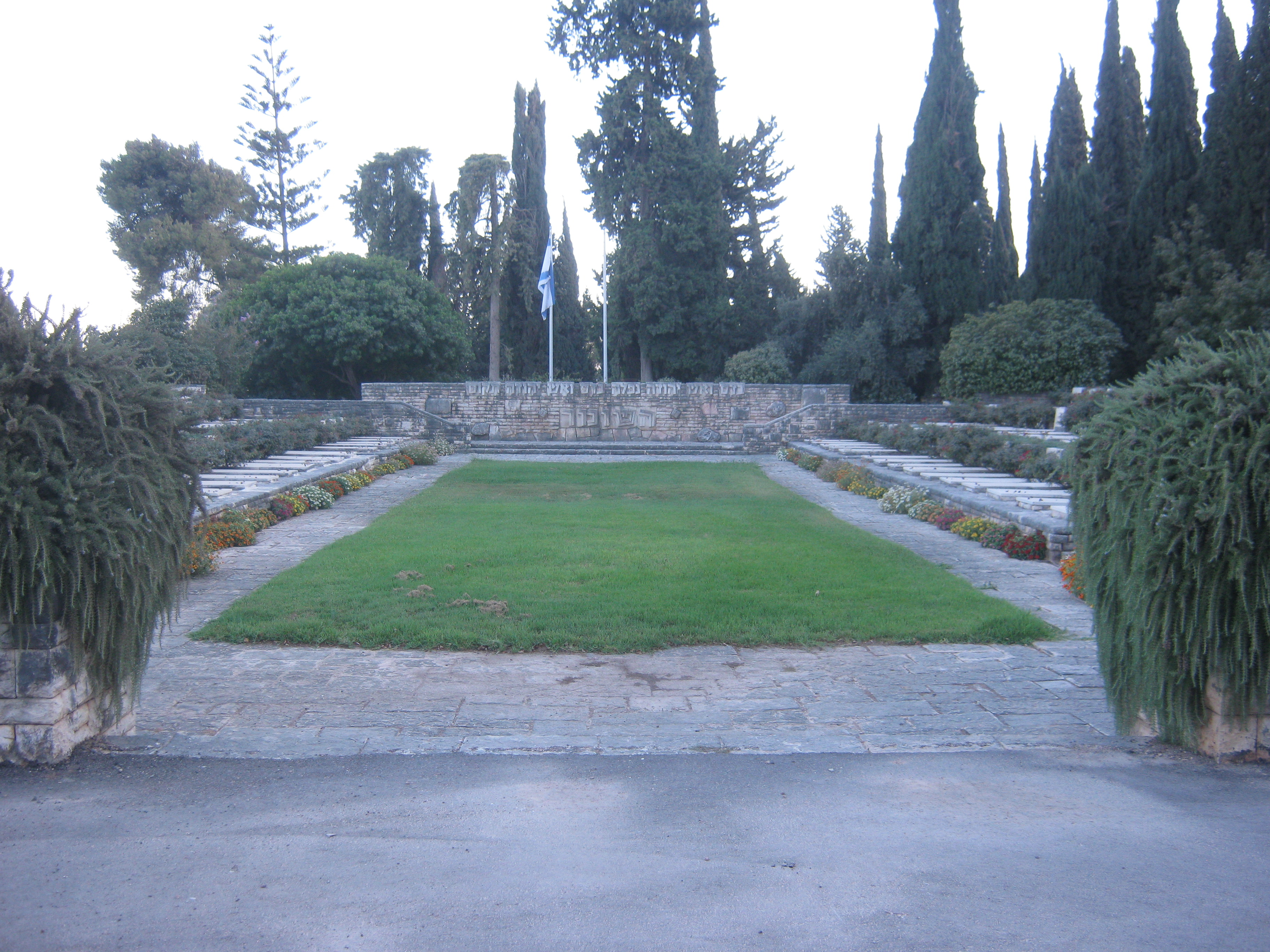
HaShomer plot, Kfar Giladi-Tel Hai cemetery

=== Hashomer section ===
The section for members of the Hashomer organization is the largest in the site and serves as a pantheon for the organization's members. It was established on the initiative of Nahum Horowitz and Yosef Nehmani. Initially, six members of the Hashomer, previously buried in different locations in the Galilee, were reburied there in the early 1930s. The section was officially established in 1950. Today, 118 members of the Hashomer, both men and women, are buried there. In one corner of the section, there are memorial plaques for about fifty Hashomer members buried elsewhere in the country, each noting their date of death and burial location.

The section spans a rectangular area, with a grass plot extending from south to north in the center, surrounded by paved paths. The graves and headstones, designed uniformly, are set on three steps on either side of the lawn. At the southern end of the lawn stands a wall with the inscription "In blood and fire, Judah fell; in blood and fire, Judah will rise - Hashomer." Steps ascending from the corner of the section lead to the Roaring Lion statue.

The section was designed by architect Uriel Schiller, who also designed the Hashomer Museum in Kfar Giladi. It was funded jointly by the families of Hashomer members, the Ministry of Defense, the Histadrut executive committee, the Upper Galilee Regional Council, the Jewish Agency, and Kfar Giladi.

An annual memorial ceremony for members of the Hashomer organization is held in the section during the intermediate days of Sukkot.

=== Tel Hai members' section ===
The Tel Hai members' section is a row of graves located south of and adjacent to the Roaring Lion statue. The headstones are uniformly designed. Above the section is a stone inscription: "Members and Defenders of Tel Hai."

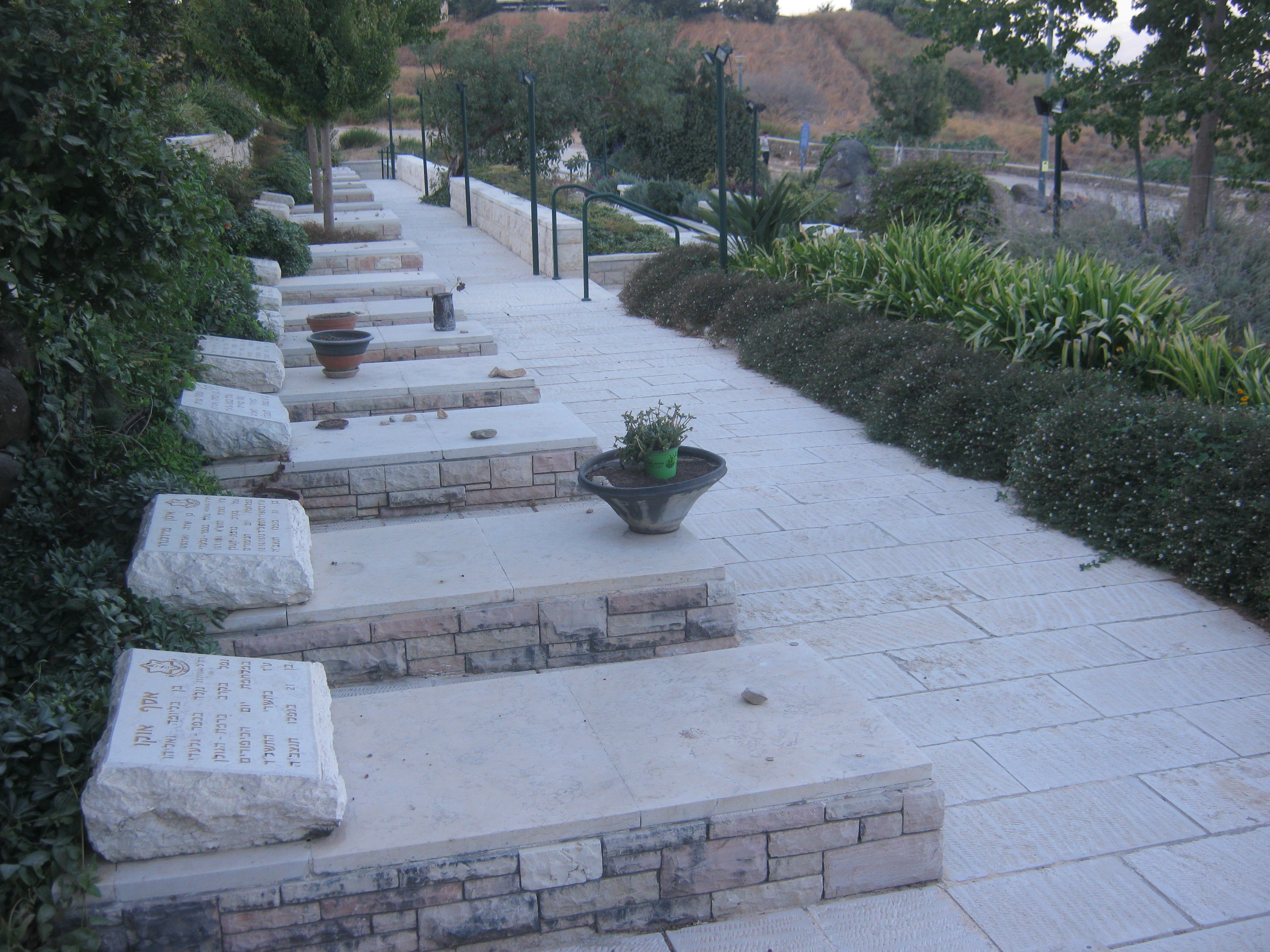
The Military Section

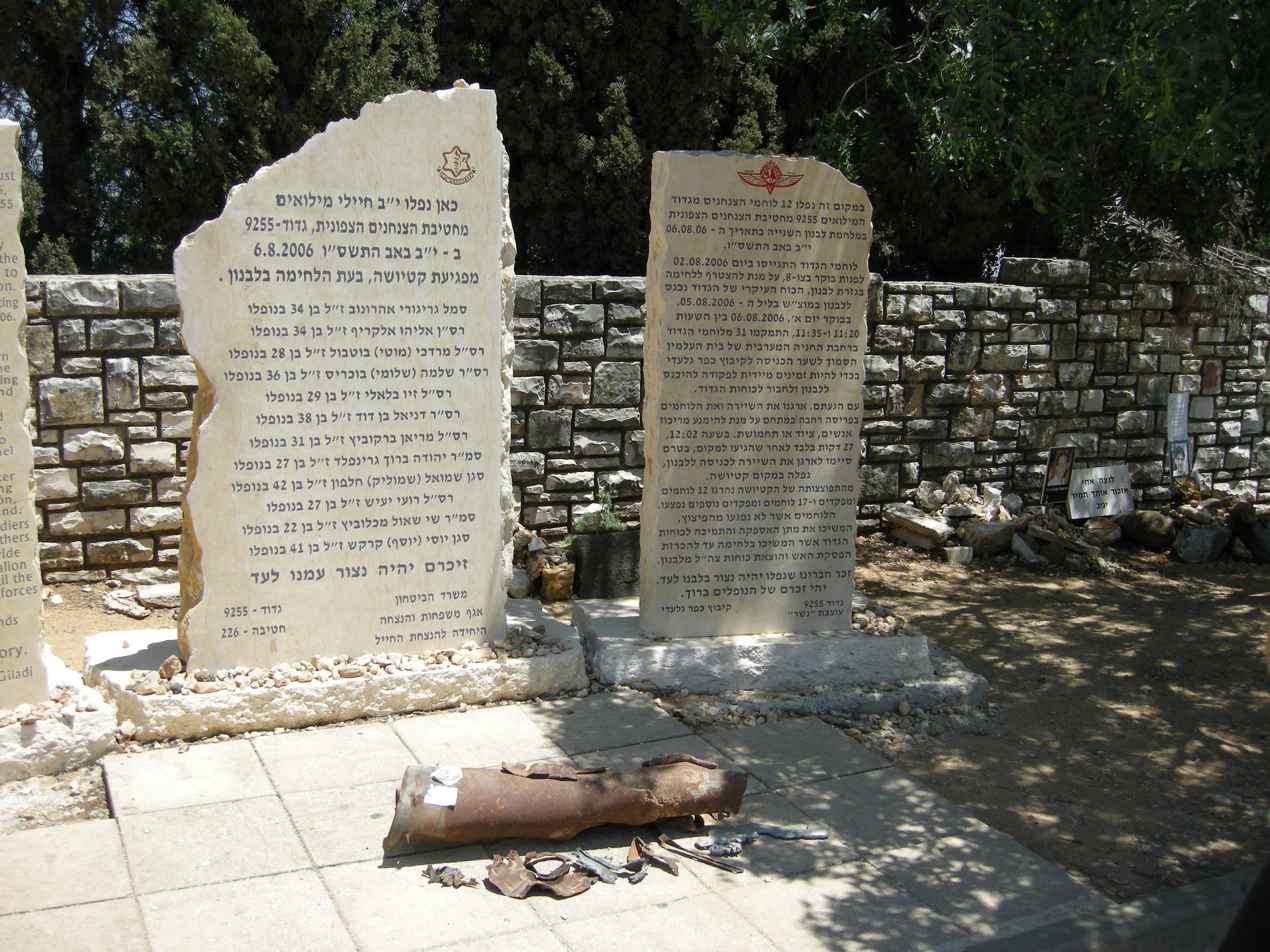
The 9255 Battalion Disaster Memorial

=== 9255 Battalion Disaster Memorial ===
On August 6, 2006, during the Second Lebanon War, reservists from the 9255 Battalion of the 226th Brigade were preparing for action in a parking lot adjacent to the cemetery. A Katyusha rocket fired from Lebanon by Hezbollah landed among them, killing 12 and wounding 17. This event is remembered as one of the greatest tragedies of the war.

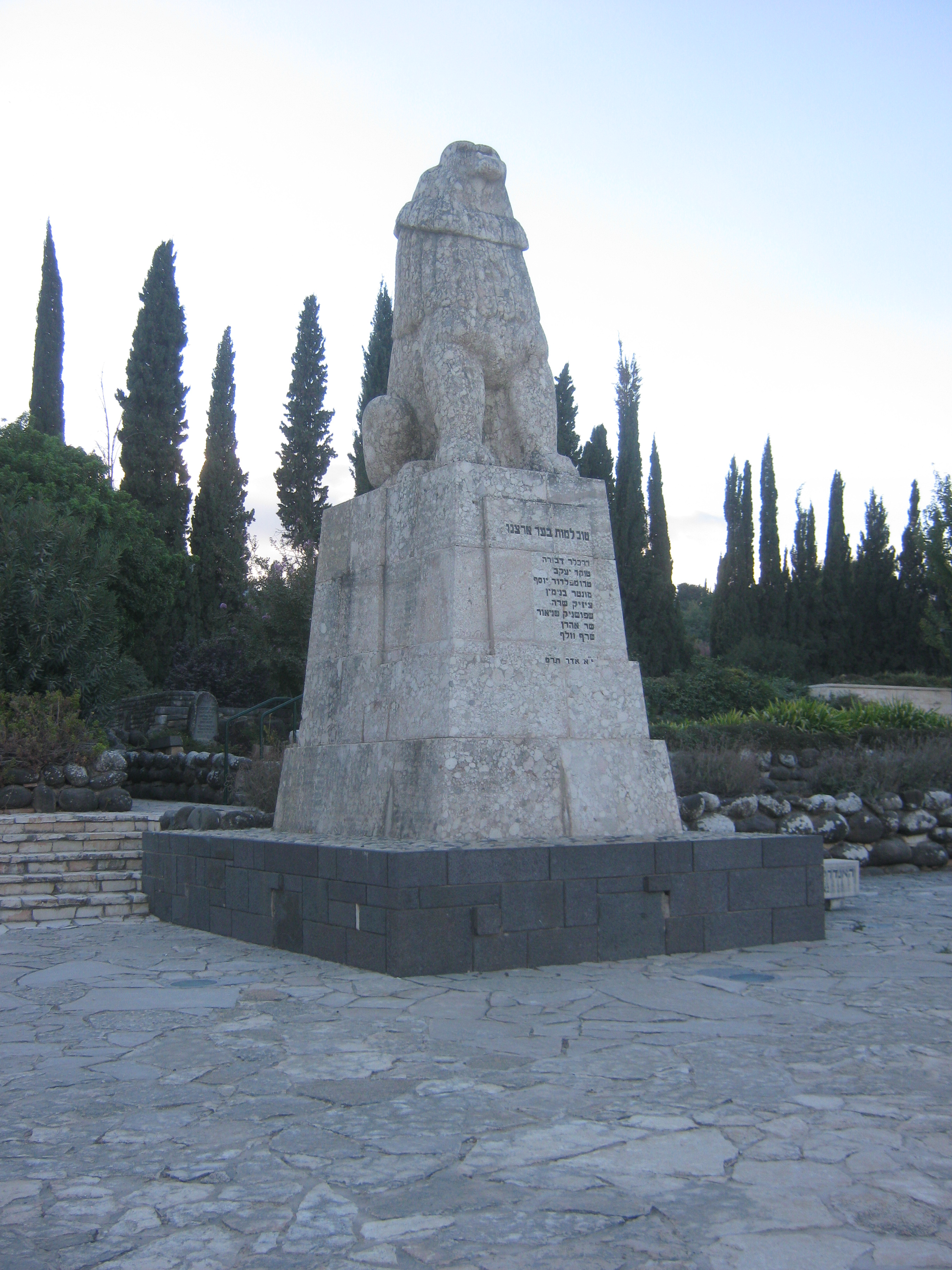
The Roaring Lion Statue

== Roaring Lion ==
The Roaring Lion statue, created by sculptor Avraham Melnikov, was erected in 1934. It overlooks the Hula Valley and the Golan Heights.

Near the statue is the grave of Avraham Melnikov and his wife, Charlotte, who requested to be buried there.
