= Keeping the Kibbutz =

- Film poster
- Directed by: Ben Crosbie; Tessa Moran
- Written by: Eidolon Films
- Edited by: Ben Crosbie; Tessa Moran
- Music by: Preston Hart
- Distributed by: Garden Thieves Pictures
- Release date: August 11, 2010 (Flagstaff)
- Running time: 54 minutes
- Countries: United States; Israel
- Languages: Hebrew; English

Keeping the Kibbutz is a 2010 American documentary film co-directed by Ben Crosbie and Tessa Moran about the Israeli kibbutz, which explores the background and history of the kibbutz movement and how the movement has changed to meet economic needs. The film is Eidolon Film's first feature production, and received a 2012 Telly Award.

== Background ==
The project was filmed during the summer of 2007 in Kfar Giladi, where Crosbie was born, the film chronicles the difficult transition from the kibbutz's original socialist economy to a capitalist model characterized, among other things, by market-determined differential wages and the hiring of outside labourers. The directors interweave rare archival footage with the stories of four kibbutzniks who speak candidly about their feelings, their nostalgia, and their hopes for the future.

According to Tessa Morgan, "The experience on the kibbutz represented a universal human desire to identify oneself through community. The question at the center of the story is: what happens when that community changes?"

== Themes ==
University of Victoria professor and blogger, David Leach, has compared the film to other recent kibbutz documentaries in terms of the five stages of grief each appears to represent: whereas Degania: The First Kibbutz Fights Its Last Battle (2008) documents anger and bargaining, and Kibbutz (2005) depression, "[i]n Keeping the Kibbutz, we get to see kibbutzniks who have reached that fifth and final stage—who have accepted, however reluctantly, the changes that have overtaken their community but still look back with fondness and nostalgia at the unique communal society from which they all emerged."

== Release ==
Keeping the Kibbutz was the Official Selection at several film festivals, including the Flagstaff International Film Festival, where it premiered, the Rhode Island International Film Festival, the DOCUTAH Film Festival, the Orlando Film Festival, the Appalachian Film Festival, the Utopia Film Festival, and the Downtown Boca Film Festival.

In the fall of 2011, the film was broadcast nationally on World Channel and over 75 PBS stations, and continues to air on individual PBS stations. It was released on DVD on October 11, 2011.

== Accolades ==
- 2012, Ben Crosbie chosen as June 2012 Filmmaker of the Month.
