= Tel Hai =

Human settlement in Israel

Coordinates: 33°14′06″N 35°34′42″E

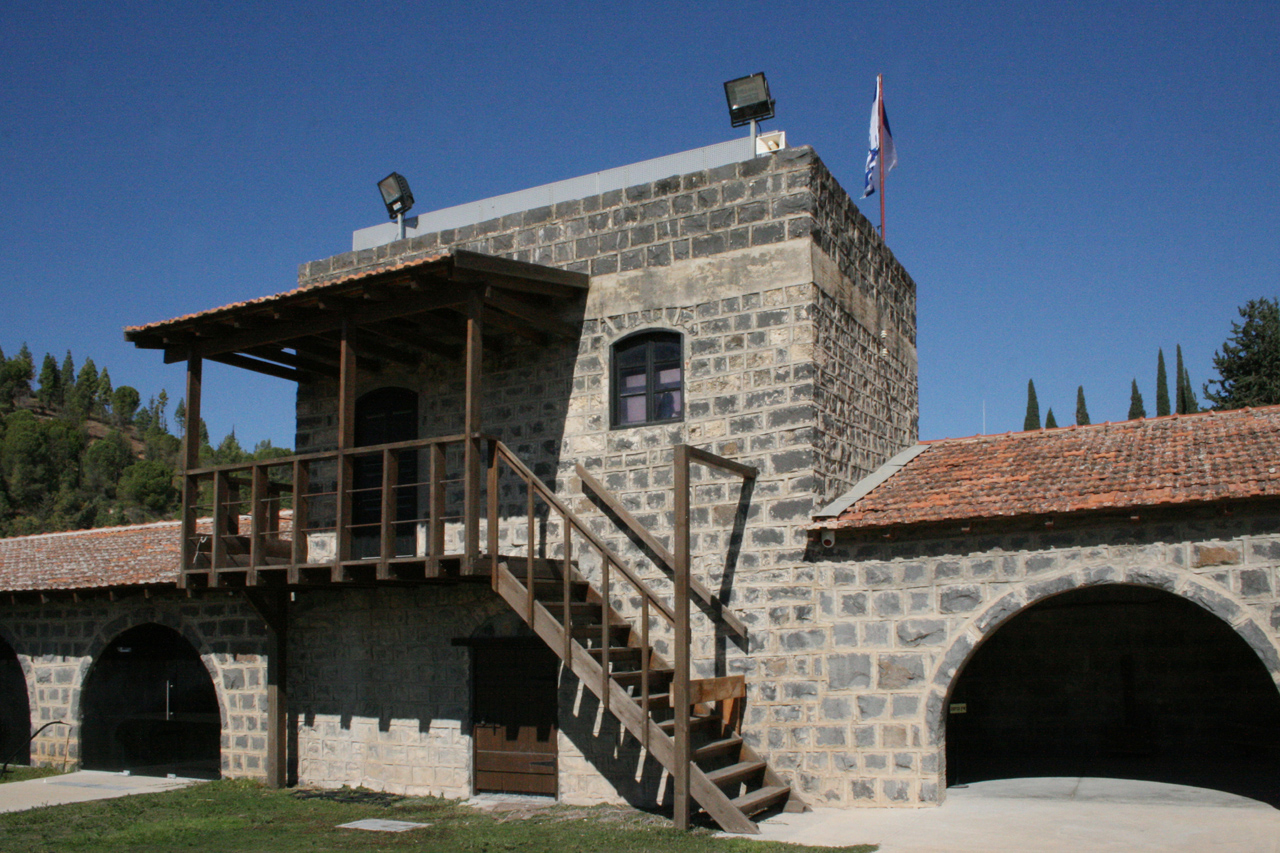
Tel Hai historic courtyard

Tel Hai (Hebrew: תֵּל חַי [tel χai], "Hill of Life") is a name of the former Jewish settlement in northern Galilee, the site of an early battle between Jews and Arabs heralding the growing civil conflict, and of a monument, tourist attraction, and a college. It is currently part of kibbutz Kfar Giladi.

The Battle of Tel Hai on 1 March 1920, which gave Tel Hai its fame, was significant, from a Jewish perspective, far beyond the small number of civil combatants on either side – mainly due to its influence on Israeli culture, both inspiring an enduring national myth and profoundly influencing the military of the Yishuv and political strategies over several decades.

In retrospect, it can be regarded as the first military engagement between Jews and Arabs, though at the time neither combatant side recognized it as such.

== History ==
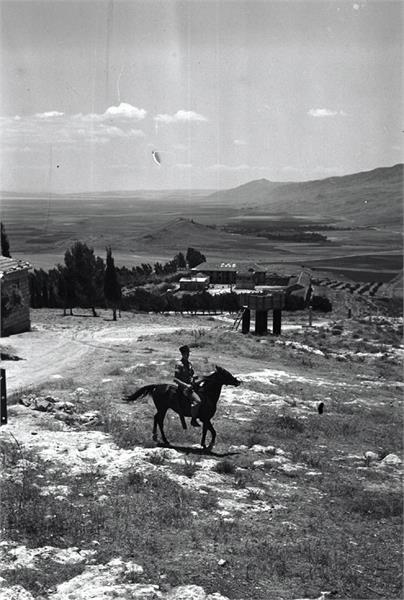
Tel Hai in 1937

Tel Hai, initially named Talha (Arabic: طلحة), was first settled in 1905 as an agricultural courtyard for six workers from a northern colony El Mutallah (Metula). The land for the outpost was purchased by Haim Kalvarisky, a clerk of the Jewish Colonization Association. In 1918, following the defeat of the Ottoman Empire, Tel Hai was given its Hebrew name, and became a border outpost and kibbutz. The area was subsequently subject to intermittent border adjustments among the British and French colonial powers.

In 1919, the British relinquished the northern section of Upper Galilee containing Tel Hai, Metulla, Hamrah, and Kfar Giladi to French jurisdiction. The Zionist movement was greatly displeased with this, since it would have left the sources of the Jordan River outside the borders of British Mandatory Palestine, where the Zionist state they envisaged was to be established. Therefore, the few isolated settlements in this territory assumed a strategic value from the Zionist point of view. Still, there was a fierce debate among factions and leaders of the Yishuv, some of whom advocated letting Tel Hai and the other outposts hang on at all costs, while others regarded their situation as untenable and advocated withdrawing from them.

Arabs in this area at the time were not primarily involved in activities against the early Jewish militias, but rather in strongly opposing the imposition of the French Mandate of Syria, which they regarded as betrayal of the McMahon–Hussein Correspondence made during the Arab Revolt against Ottoman rule. In a letter dated 24 October 1915, Sir Henry McMahon, then His Majesty's High Commissioner in Egypt, promises the Sharif of Mecca, Husayn ibn Ali, to "recognize and support the independence of the Arabs within the territories proposed by him (Sharif of Mecca), the exact extent of which became a matter of dispute."

The Zionist militias in Tel Hai, headed by the Russian-born Jewish commander Joseph Trumpeldor wanted the area to be restored to British control which they hoped would eventually lead to its becoming part of a future Jewish state. However, as newcomers to the area recently arrived from Europe, they were suspected of being pro-French, which ultimately led to armed clashes.

In one notable exchange, on March 1, 1920, Shi'ite Arabs from Jabal Amil in southern Lebanon sought to search Tel Hai, however the Jews called for reinforcements from the kibbutz Kfar Giladi. Joseph Trumpeldor and ten men attempted to drive the Shi'ite men away.

At the end of a verbal dispute, an armed confrontation did break out, in which six of the Tel Hai Jews were killed and the remaining Jews retreated, whereupon the place was burned. The total number of killed was 13 (5 Muslims and 8 Jews). The British and the French, at the behest of the Zionists, ultimately agreed this area of Upper Galilee was to be included in Mandatory Palestine. It was thus possible for Tel Hai to be resettled in 1921, though it did not become a viable independent community and in 1926 it was absorbed into the kibbutz of Kfar Giladi.

== Tel Hai monument ==
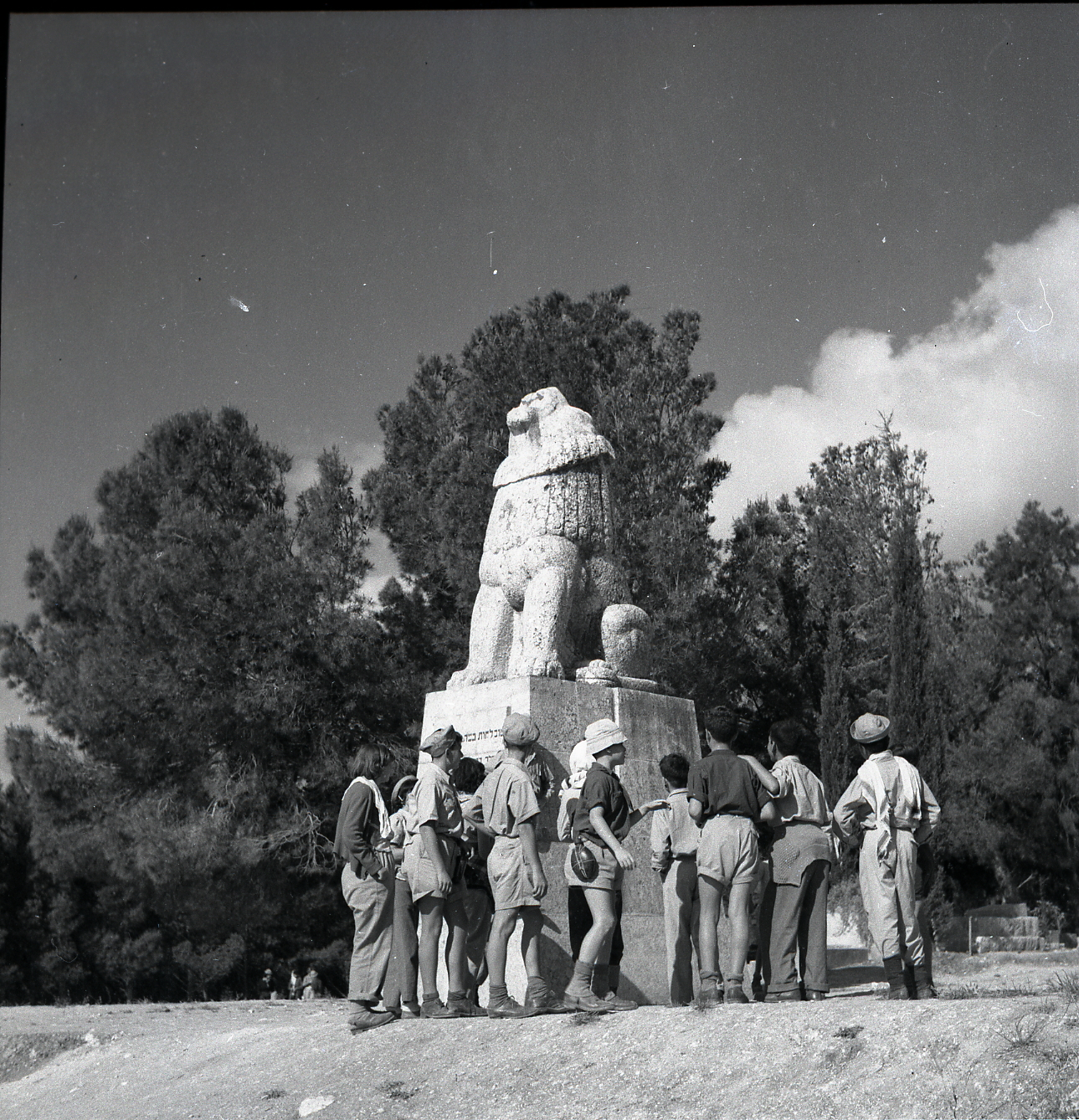
Trumpeldor monument by Avraham Melnikov in Tel Hai, c. 1953. Photo by Beno Rothenberg.

A Jewish national monument in Upper Galilee, Israel, commemorates the deaths of the eight Jews (six men and two women), among them the Russian-born Jewish commander Joseph Trumpeldor, who fell in the above-detailed engagement on 1 March 1920. The resolute actions of Trumpeldor and his colleagues against a much larger Arab force inspired the Jews of Jerusalem. The memorial is known for a statue of a defiant lion representing Trumpeldor and his comrades. The city of Kiryat Shmona, literally Town of the Eight was named after them.

== Gallery ==
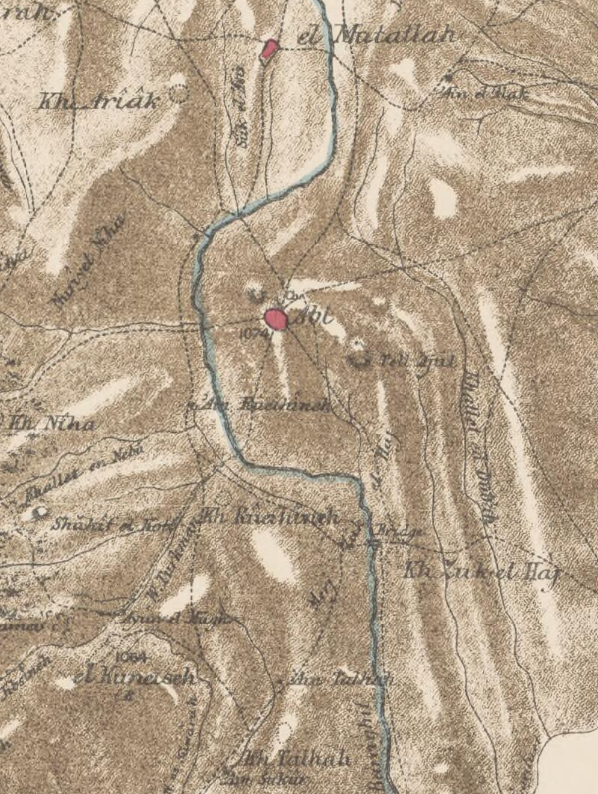
Talhah in 1878

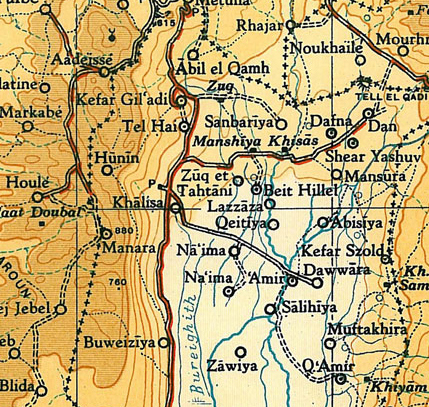
Tel Hai in 1946

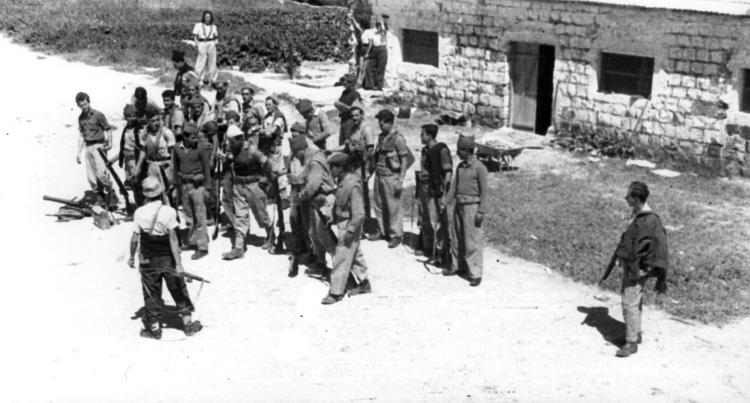
Members from Yiftach Brigade assembling at Tel Hai prior to the attack on Al-Nabi Yusha' in 1948

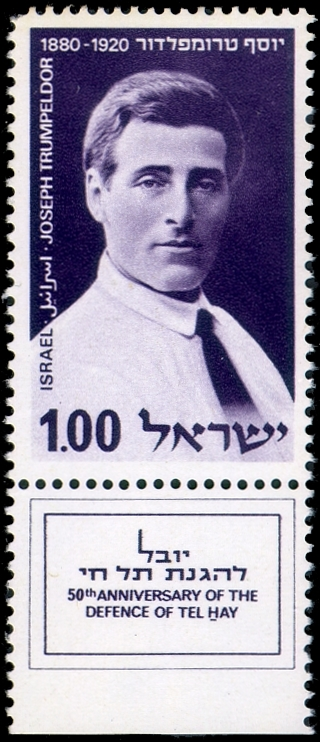
A commemorative stamp for 50th anniversary of the defense of Tel Hai with a Trumpeldor picture

== See also ==
- Killing of Moshe Barsky
- Riots in Palestine of 1920
- Sykes-Picot Agreement
- Tel-Hai Academic College
