= Al-Hamra' =

Al-Hamra' الحمراء
- Village
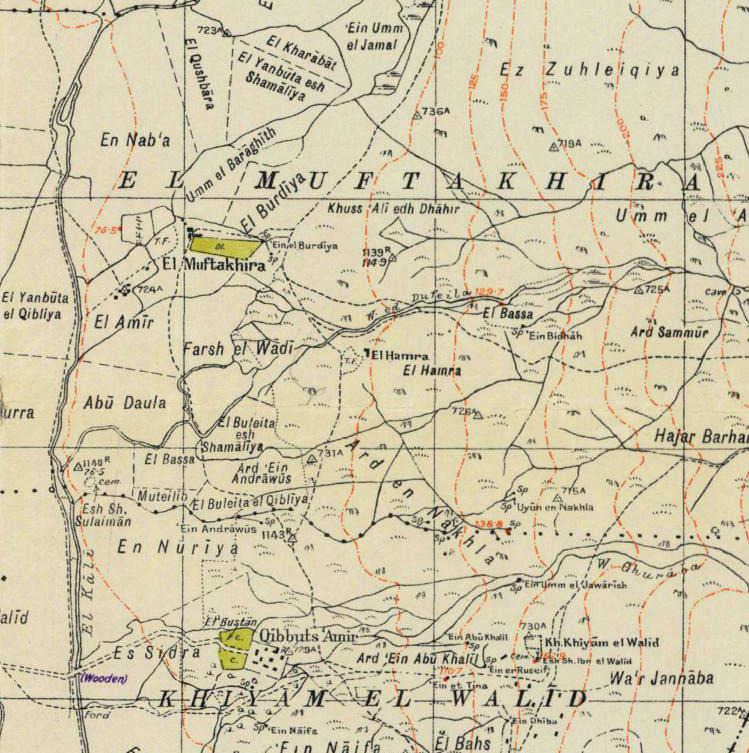
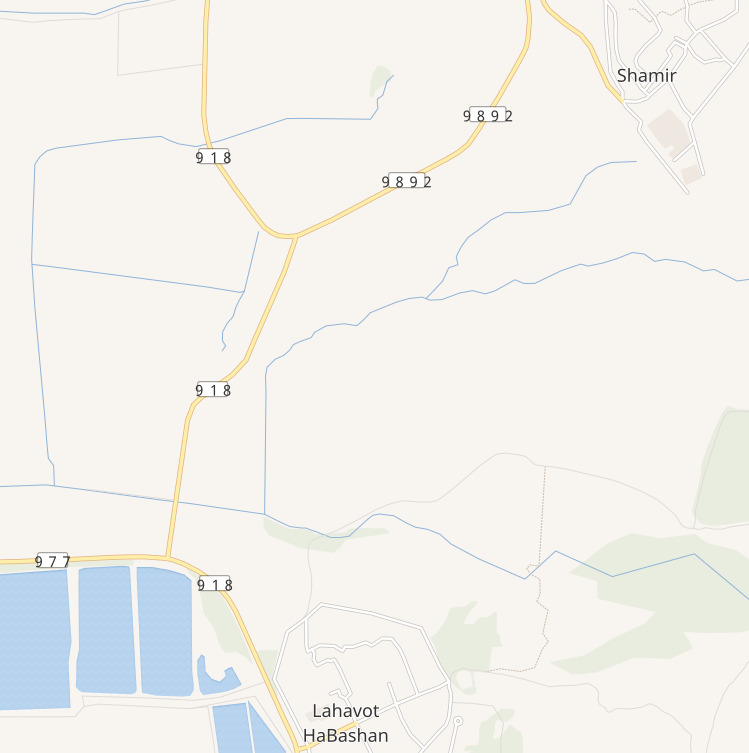
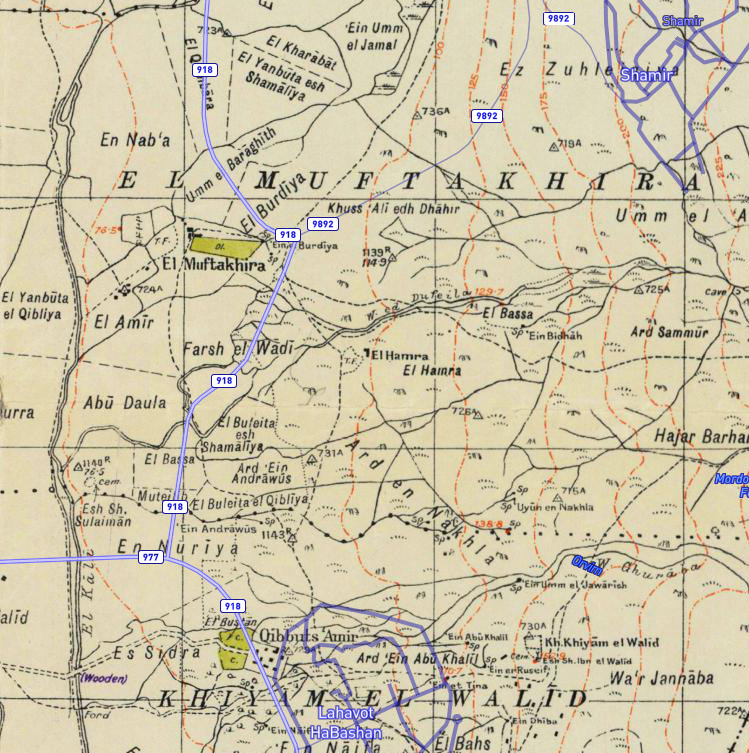
- 1940s map modern map 1940s with modern overlay map A series of historical maps of the area around Al-Hamra' (click the buttons)

- Location within Mandatory Palestine
- Coordinates: 33°09′11″N 35°38′51″E
- Palestine grid: 210/284
- Geopolitical entity: Mandatory Palestine
- Subdistrict: Safad
- Date of depopulation: May 1, 1948
- Cause(s) of depopulation: Fear of being caught up in the fighting
- Secondary cause: Military assault by Yishuv forces

Al-Hamra' (Arabic: الحمراء) was a Palestinian Arab village in the Safad Subdistrict. It was depopulated during the 1947–1948 Civil War in Mandatory Palestine on May 1, 1948, by the Palmach's First Battalion of Operation Yiftach. It was located 24.5 km northeast of Safad, 1 km northwest of Wadi al-Dufayla.

== History ==
During the British Mandate for Palestine, Al-Hamra' was noted as a village in the Palestine index Gazetteer.

In 1944, Shamir was established about 2 km northeast of the village site.

== Bibliography ==
- Khalidi, W. (1992). All That Remains: The Palestinian Villages Occupied and Depopulated by Israel in 1948. Washington D.C.: Institute for Palestine Studies. ISBN 0-88728-224-5.
- Morris, B. (2004). The Birth of the Palestinian Refugee Problem Revisited. Cambridge University Press. ISBN 978-0-521-00967-6.
