= Kfar Giladi =

Kibbutz in northern Israel

Kfar Giladi: כפר גלעדי (Hebrew)
- Kibbutz
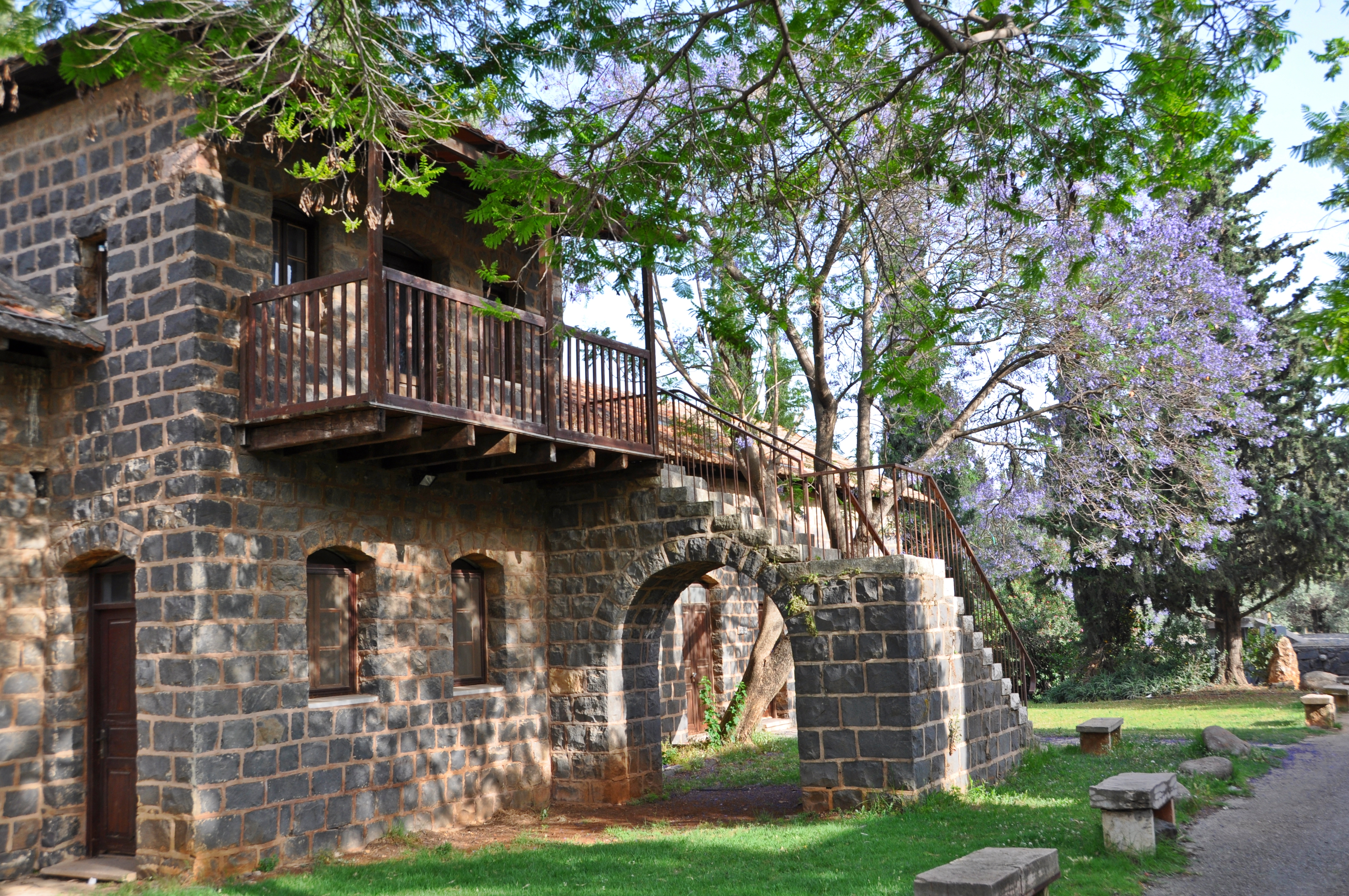
- Founders' house

- Location within Northeast Israel Location within Israel
- Coordinates: 33°14′33″N 35°34′30″E
- Country: Israel
- District: Northern
- Subdistrict: Safed
- Council: Upper Galilee
- Affiliation: Kibbutz Movement
- Founded: 1916
- Founder: Hashomer members
- Population (2024): 798
- Website: www.kfar-giladi.org.il

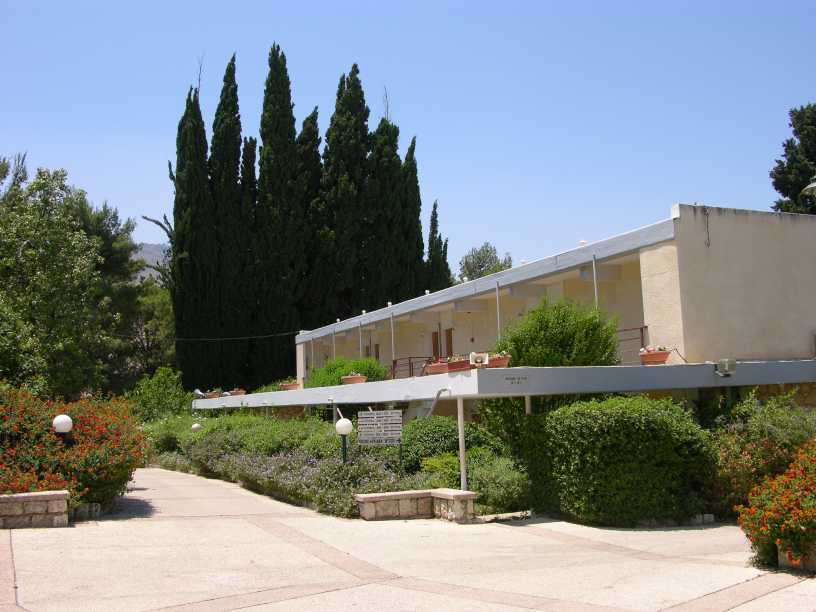
Guest house

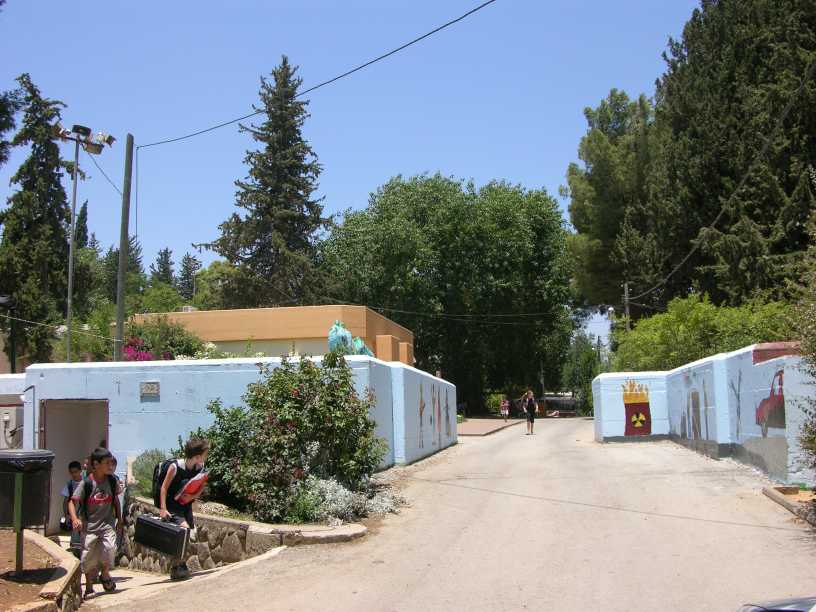
Kfar Giladi bomb shelters

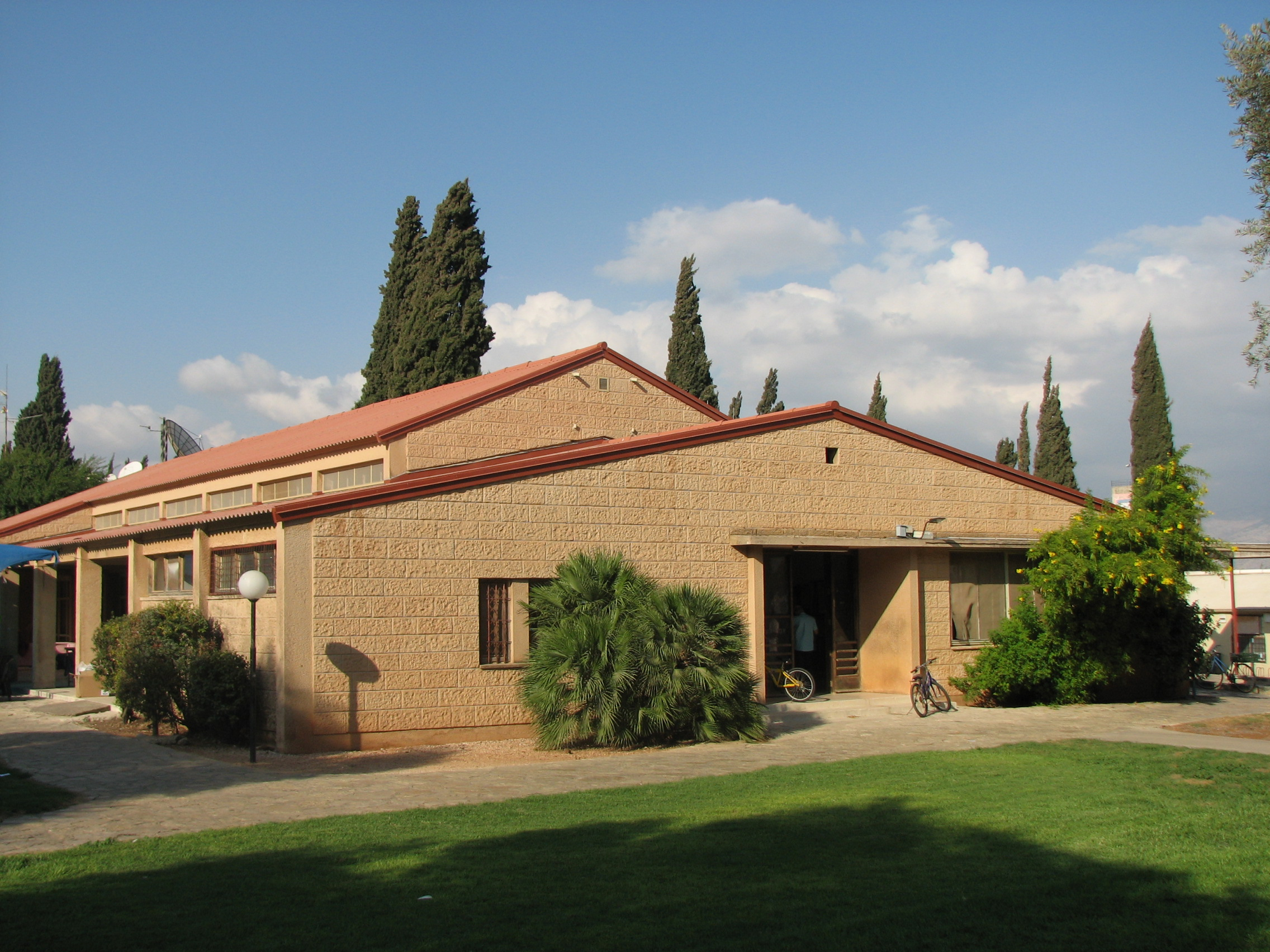
Old dining room

Kfar Giladi (Hebrew: כפר גלעדי, lit. 'Giladi Village') is a kibbutz in the Galilee Panhandle of northern Israel. Located south of Metula on the Naftali Mountains above the Hula Valley and along the Lebanese border, it falls under the jurisdiction of Upper Galilee Regional Council. In 2024, it had a population of 798.

== History ==
=== Archaeology ===
Kfar Giladi is also notable for archaeological discoveries such as Neolithic and Chalcolithic findings as well as the remains of a Jewish mausoleum dating from Roman times.

A Greek boundary stone from the reign of Diocletian (284–305 CE) was discovered in the vicinity of Kfar Giladi, forming part of the corpus of Diocletianic territorial markers associated with Paneas (Banias) in the northern Hula Valley. Marom proposes that one of the villages named in this boundary-stone corpus, Mamsia, is preserved in the local toponym Marsīna (مرصينة) around Kfar Giladi.

=== Establishment ===
Kfar Giladi was founded in 1916 by members of Hashomer on land owned by the Jewish Colonisation Association. It was named after Israel Giladi, one of the founders of the Hashomer movement. The area was subject to intermittent border adjustments between the British and the French, and in 1919, the British relinquished the northern section of the Upper Galilee containing Tel Hai, Metula, Hamra, and Kfar Giladi to the French jurisdiction. After the Arab attack on Tel Hai in 1920, it was temporarily abandoned. Ten months later, the settlers returned. Several older buildings stand on the kibbutz that memorialize previous battles on the site, before and during the 1948 Arab–Israeli War.

In 1921 a top secret arms store was dug 10 metres into the hillside. Measuring 5 by 5 metres square and 2 metres high its entrance was concealed in a stable. It was never discovered by the Mandate authorities.

Between 1916 and 1932, the population totaled 40–70. In 1932, the kibbutz absorbed 100 newcomers, mainly young immigrants. From 1922 to 1948, between 8,000 and 10,000 Jewish immigrants were smuggled into Palestine through Kibbutz Giladi, circumventing the Mandatory ban on Jewish immigration. The immigrants came from Syria, Lebanon, Turkey, Iraq, Afghanistan and Eastern Europe.

In an operation known as Mivtzah HaElef, 1,300 Jewish children were smuggled out of Syria between 1945 and 1948. At the kibbutz, the children were dressed in work clothes and hidden in the kibbutz chicken coops and cowsheds.

In August 2006, during the 2006 Lebanon War, twelve reserve IDF soldiers were killed after being hit by a Katyusha rocket launched by Hezbollah from Southern Lebanon. The group of artillery gunners were gathering on the kibbutz in preparation for action in the conflict.

=== Gaza war ===
During the Gaza war, northern Israeli border communities, including Kfar Giladi, faced targeted attacks by Hezbollah and Palestinian factions based in Lebanon, and were evacuated.

==== 2024 Israeli invasion of Lebanon ====
On 30 September 2024, the Israeli Defense Forces (IDF) launched a limited ground invasion into Southern Lebanon. On that same day, the IDF declared that Kfar Giladi became a closed military area.

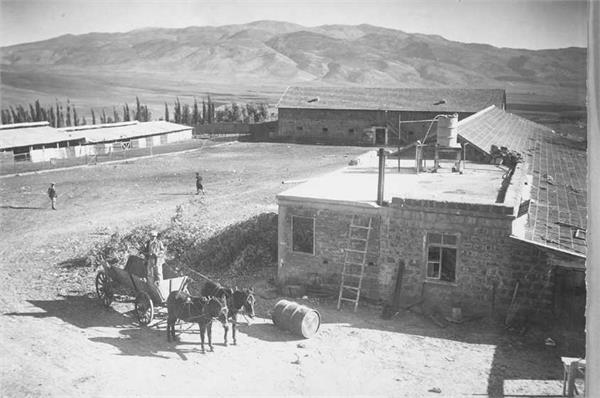
Kfar Giladi 1930

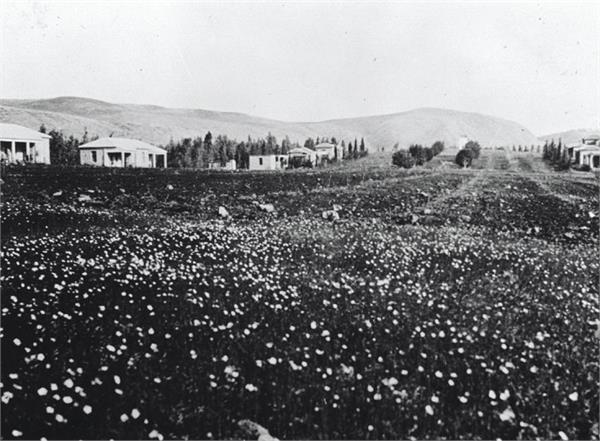
Kfar Giladi 1930

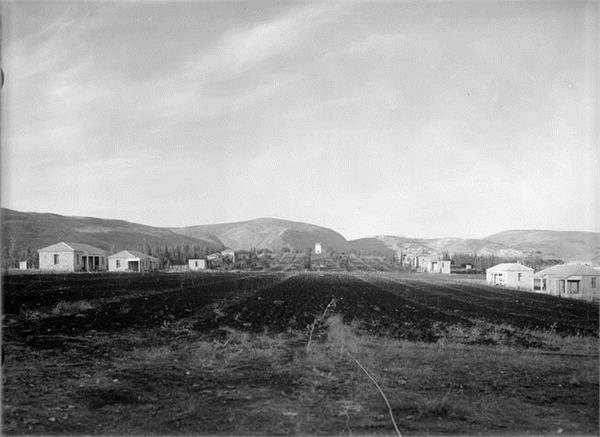
Kfar Giladi 1934

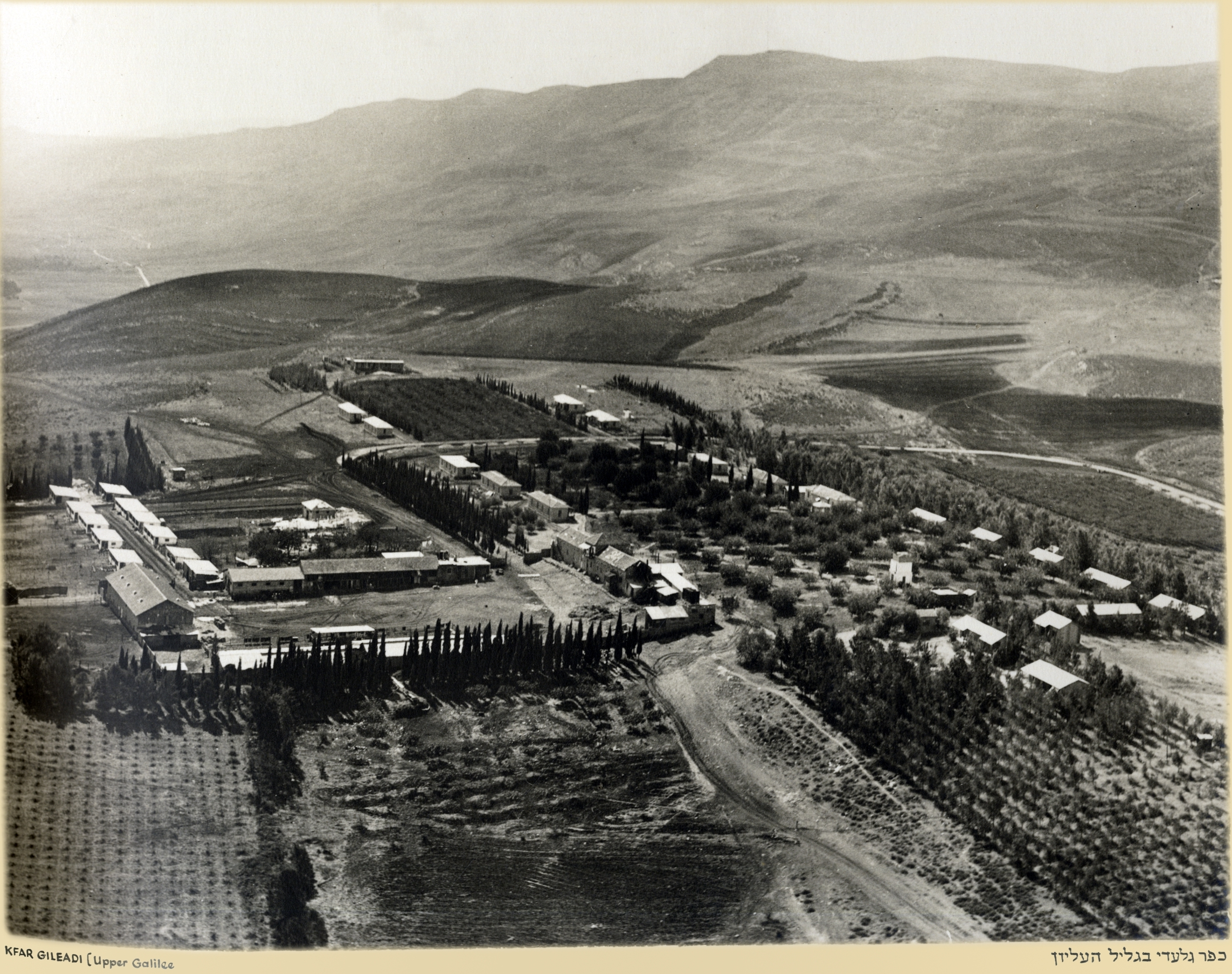
Kfar Giladi 1937

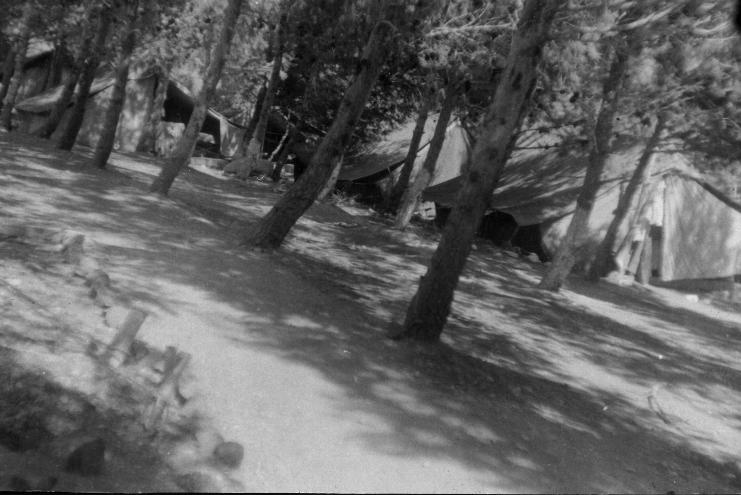
Palmach camp at Kfar Giladi. 1948

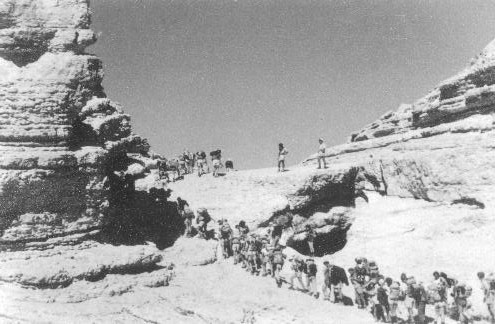
Members of the Palmach from Kfar Giladi on exercise. c. 1947

== Landmarks ==
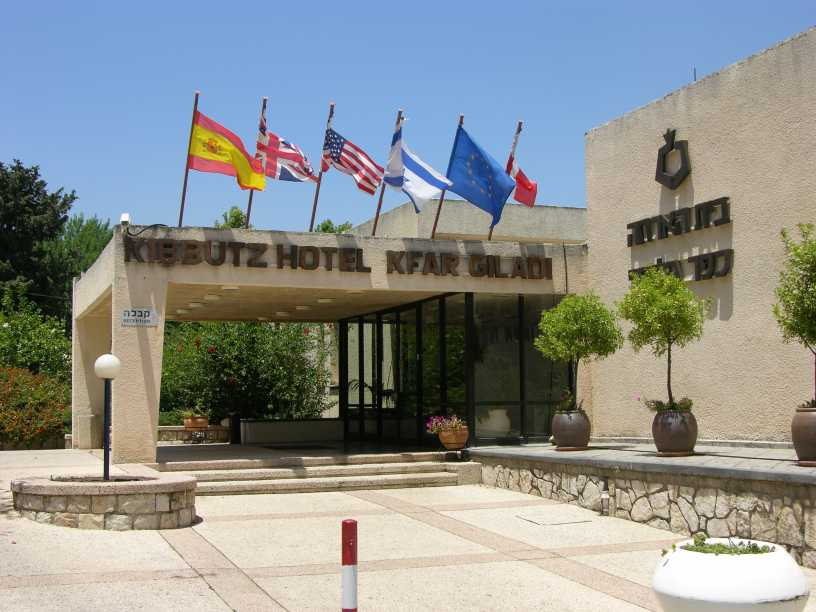
Kfar Giladi guesthouse

Eight historic buildings built in 1922 are being preserved and restored. Built of Galilee stone and materials imported from Lebanon, they are among the few remaining vestiges of early kibbutz housing.

== Economy ==
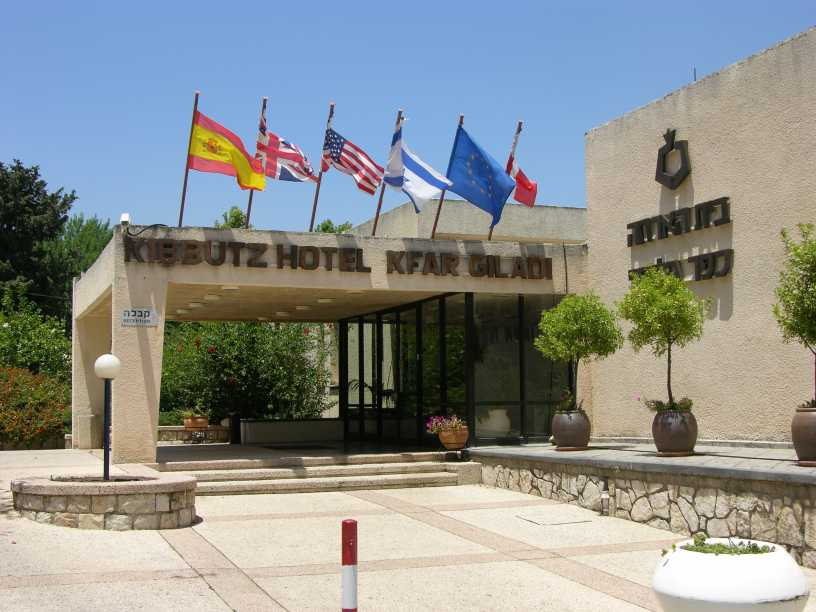
Kibbutz Giladi guesthouse

The economy of Kfar Giladi is based on agriculture, a quarry, nurseries, an eyewear factory (Galilee Optics, which closed in 2005) and a hotel. The kibbutz grows apples and avocados, utilizing volunteers to help pick fruit during the harvest. Other crops include lychees, corn, cotton, wheat and potatoes. The kibbutz also raises chickens and dairy cows, and operates fish ponds.

== Archaeology ==
=== Neolithic and Chalcolithic remains ===
An archaeological site at Kfar Giladi was excavated in 1957 and 1962. It revealed remains four stages of occupation in different periods. An early Neolithic stage was suggested to date between 6400 and 5800 BC. Finds included Dark faced burnished ware with incisions and rope patterns. Flints included axes, adzes, arrowheads and denticulated sickle blade elements. Similar finds were located in a later neolithic stage including a female clay figurine dating between 5800 and 5400 BC. Two later periods of occupation were attributed to Chalcolithic occupations similar to Wadi Rabah.

Another nearby Neolithic site was excavated in 1973. They found Byblos points and tips of Jericho points and Amuq points, polished cutting axes, chisels and fine-toothed sickles. Finds were similar to Tell Ramad.

=== Mausoleum Yad Hezekiah – Giv'at ha-Shoqet ===
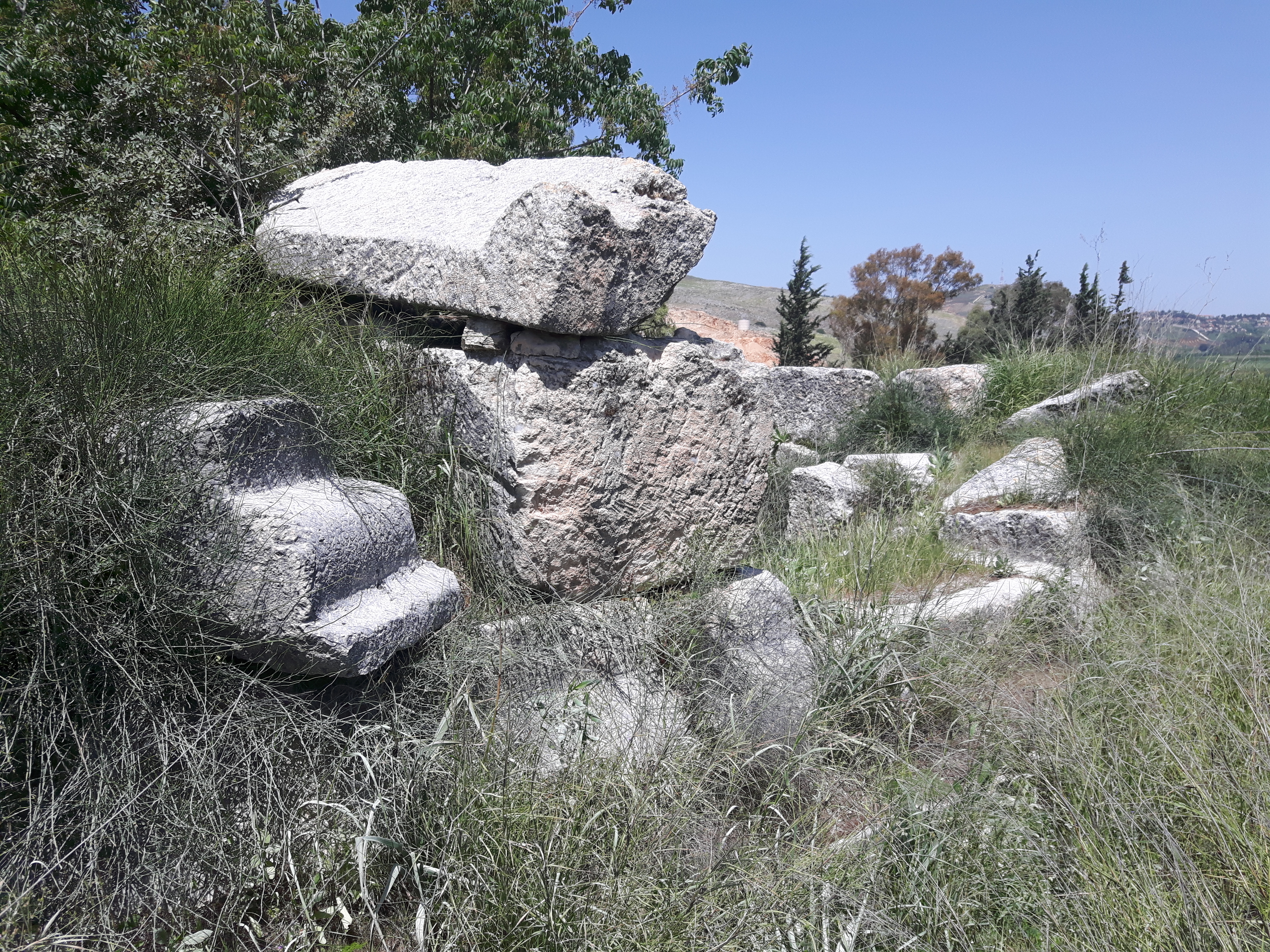
The upper level of the mausoleum

In 1961, J. Kaplan conducted an excavation at Giv'at ha-Shoqet, a hill located southwest of the built area of Kfar Giladi, and revealed a mausoleum with three burial levels. The uppermost level, Stratum I, contained an empty sarcophagus inscribed with the Hebrew name Hezekiah, indicating it belonged to a Jewish individual. Kaplan proposed that the mausoleum was built to house this sarcophagus.

The layer below, Stratum II, situated beneath the mausoleum floor, contained seven rectangular graves, some featuring lead coffins adorned with depictions such as Hercules; one of them had a gold diadem and bracelet adorned with semi-precious stones. The lowest stratum (stratum III) included a marble sarcophagus belonging to Heracleides.

Kaplan identified two usage periods: the first (Stratum I and III) dating to no later than the Severan dynasty (192–235 AD), with Hezekiah and Heracleides buried, and the second (Stratum II) with the seven graves dating around 290–310 AD.

=== Climate ===
Climate data for Kfar Giladi (2007-2020 Temperature Normals, 1935-1948, 2007-2020 Temperature Extremes, 1991-2020 Precipitation Normals)
Month	Jan	Feb	Mar	Apr	May	Jun	Jul	Aug	Sep	Oct	Nov	Dec	Year
Record high °C (°F)	23.3 (73.9)	27.1 (80.8)	33.3 (91.9)	38.4 (101.1)	40.5 (104.9)	40.9 (105.6)	41.3 (106.3)	43.5 (110.3)	45.2 (113.4)	38.8 (101.8)	33.8 (92.8)	30.8 (87.4)	45.2 (113.4)
Mean daily maximum °C (°F)	14.8 (58.6)	17.1 (62.8)	20.2 (68.4)	24.2 (75.6)	28.4 (83.1)	31.2 (88.2)	32.9 (91.2)	33.3 (91.9)	32.1 (89.8)	29.1 (84.4)	23.1 (73.6)	17.7 (63.9)	25.3 (77.5)
Daily mean °C (°F)	11.3 (52.3)	13.1 (55.6)	15.6 (60.1)	18.8 (65.8)	22.6 (72.7)	25.3 (77.5)	27.1 (80.8)	27.7 (81.9)	26.4 (79.5)	24.1 (75.4)	18.7 (65.7)	14.0 (57.2)	20.4 (68.7)
Mean daily minimum °C (°F)	7.9 (46.2)	9.1 (48.4)	11.0 (51.8)	13.5 (56.3)	16.9 (62.4)	19.4 (66.9)	21.4 (70.5)	22.0 (71.6)	20.8 (69.4)	18.6 (65.5)	14.4 (57.9)	10.3 (50.5)	15.4 (59.7)
Record low °C (°F)	−3.0 (26.6)	−4.0 (24.8)	0.0 (32.0)	2.0 (35.6)	9.0 (48.2)	12.8 (55.0)	16.0 (60.8)	15.5 (59.9)	12.0 (53.6)	11.0 (51.8)	4.0 (39.2)	−1.2 (29.8)	−4.0 (24.8)
Average precipitation mm (inches)	197.1 (7.76)	160.8 (6.33)	89.7 (3.53)	38.0 (1.50)	9.6 (0.38)	0.7 (0.03)	0.1 (0.00)	0.1 (0.00)	4.3 (0.17)	22.8 (0.90)	81.1 (3.19)	152.8 (6.02)	757.1 (29.81)
Average precipitation days (≥ 0.1 mm)	13.6	11.8	9.6	5.7	3.0	0.3	0	0.1	0.9	4.6	7.7	12.0	69.3
Source: Israel Meteorological Service

== See also ==
- Keeping the Kibbutz (2010 documentary about Kfar Giladi)
- Kfar Giladi–Tel Hai Cemetery
