= 1920 Nebi Musa riots =

Anti-Zionist riots in and around Jerusalem's Old City in British-controlled Palestine

1920 Jerusalem riots
- Part of the intercommunal conflict in Mandatory Palestine and the Franco-Syrian War
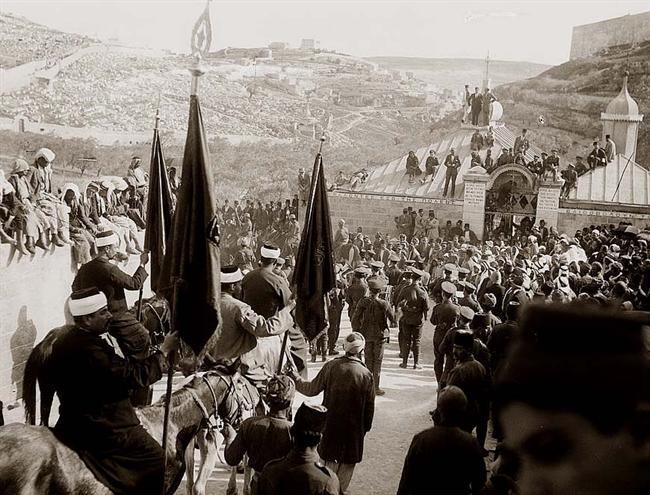
- Nebi Musa procession, 4 April 1920
- Location: 31°47′0″N 35°13′0″E; Jerusalem, Palestine
- Date: 4–7 April 1920
- Attack type: Riot
- Deaths: 5 Jews, 4 Arabs
- Injuries: 216 Jews, 18 Arabs, 7 Britons

The 1920 Nebi Musa riots or 1920 Jerusalem riots took place in the British-controlled part of Occupied Enemy Territory Administration from 4 to 7 April 1920 in and around the Old City of Jerusalem. Five Jews were killed and several hundred injured; four Arabs were killed and 18 injured; seven Britons were injured. The riots coincided with and are named after the Nebi Musa festival, which was held every year on Easter Sunday, and followed rising tensions in Arab–Jewish relations. The riots came shortly after the Battle of Tel Hai amid increasing pressure on Arab nationalists in Syria in the course of the Franco-Syrian War.

Arab religious leaders gave speeches during the festival (in which large numbers of Muslims traditionally gathered for a religious procession) that included slogans referencing Zionist immigration and previous confrontations over outlying Jewish villages in the Galilee. The trigger that turned the procession into a riot is not known with certainty.

The British military administration of Palestine was criticized for withdrawing troops from inside Jerusalem and because it was slow to regain control. As a result of the riots, trust among the British, Jews, and Arabs eroded. One consequence was that the region's Jewish community increased moves towards an autonomous infrastructure and security apparatus parallel to that of the British administration, prompting the formation of the Haganah.

In its wake, sheikhs of 82 villages around the city and Jaffa, claiming to represent 70% of the population, issued a document protesting the demonstrations against the Jews. Notwithstanding the riots, the Jewish community held elections for the Assembly of Representatives on 19 April 1920 among Jews everywhere in Palestine except Jerusalem, where they were delayed to 3 May. The riots also preceded the San Remo conference, which was held from 19 to 26 April 1920, and at which the fate of the Middle East was to be decided.

== Background ==
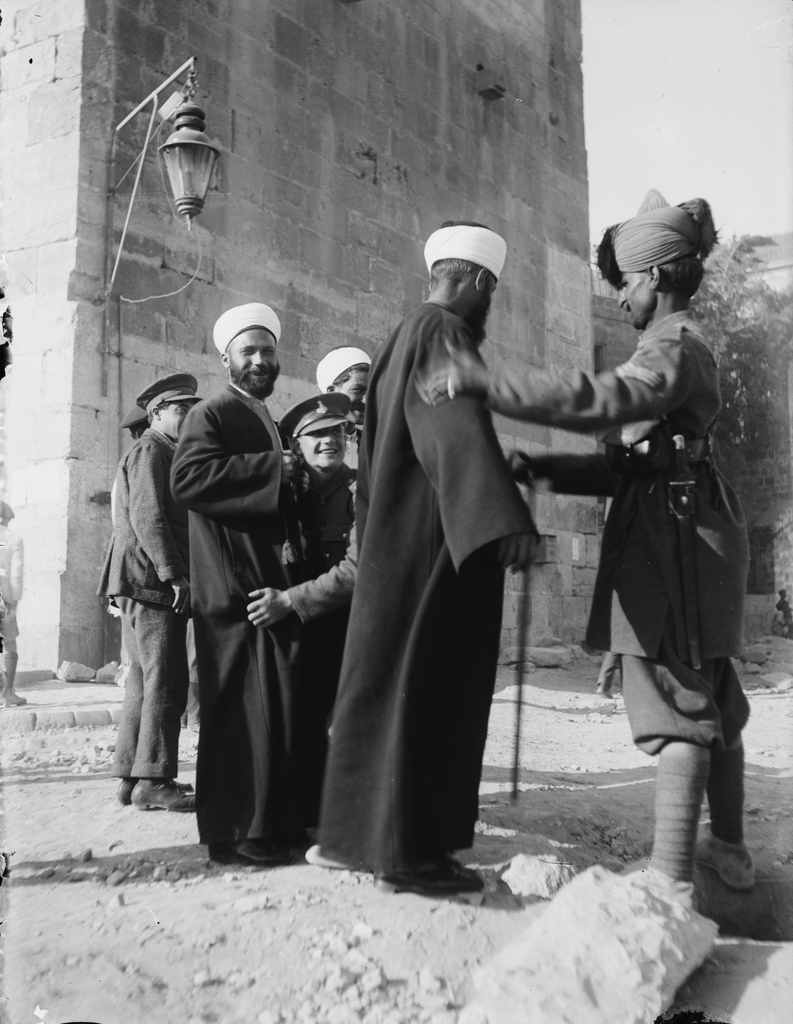
British and Indian soldiers searching two Arab mullahs, April 1920

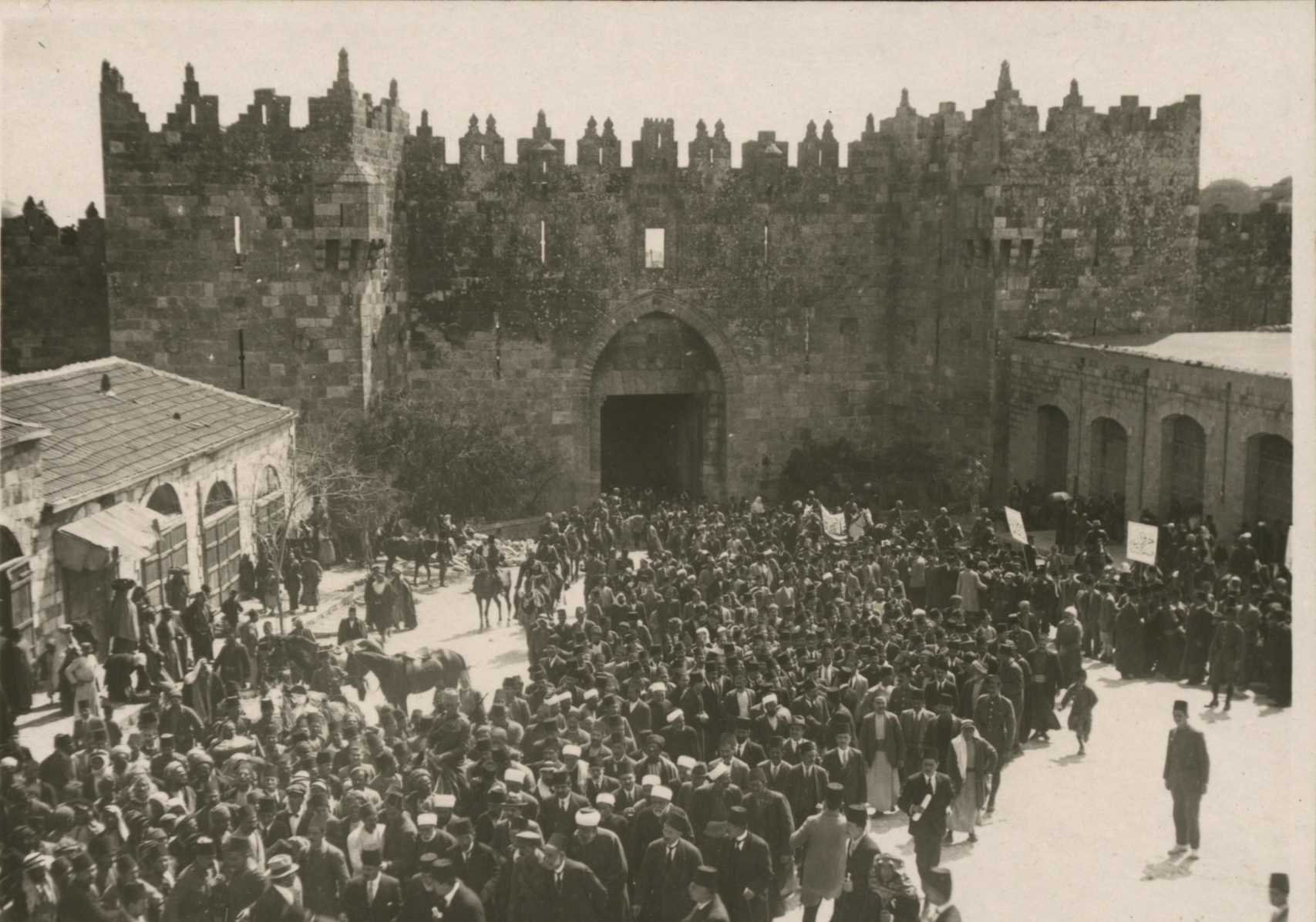
Anti-Zionist demonstration at Damascus Gate, 8 March 1920

The contents and proposals of both the Balfour Declaration of 1917 and Paris Peace Conference, 1919, which later concluded with the signing of the Treaty of Versailles, were the subject of intensive discussion by both Zionist and Arab delegations, and the process of the negotiations was widely reported in both communities. In particular, the collapse of the Ottoman Empire led to an undertaking by the victorious powers, predominantly Great Britain and France, to assume a 'holy mission of civilization' in the power vacuum of the Middle East. Under the Balfour Declaration, a homeland for the Jewish people was to be created in Palestine. The principle of self-determination affirmed by the League of Nations was not to be applied to Palestine, given the foreseeable rejection by the people of Zionism, which the British sponsored. These post-World War I arrangements both for Palestine and other Arab societies led to a radicalization of the Arab world.

On 1 March 1920, the death of Joseph Trumpeldor in the Battle of Tel Hai at the hands of a Shia group from Southern Lebanon caused deep concern among Jewish leaders, who made numerous requests to the OETA administration to address the Yishuv's security and forbid a pro-Syrian public rally. However, their fears were largely discounted by the Chief Administrative Officer General Louis Bols, Military Governor Ronald Storrs and General Edmund Allenby, despite a warning from the head of the Zionist Commission Chaim Weizmann that a "pogrom is in the air", supported by assessments available to Storrs. Communiqués had been issued about foreseeable troubles among Arabs, and between Arabs and Jews. To Weizmann and the Jewish leadership, these developments were reminiscent of instructions that Russian generals had issued on the eve of pogroms. In the meantime, local Arab expectations had been raised to a pitch by the declaration of the Syrian Congress on 7 March of the independence of the region of Syria in the Kingdom of Syria, with Faisal as its king, that included the British-controlled territory within its claimed domain. On 7 and 8 March, demonstrations took place in all cities of Palestine, shops were closed and many Jews were attacked. Attackers carried slogans such as "Death to Jews" or "Palestine is our land and the Jews are our dogs!"

Jewish leaders requested that OETA authorise the arming of the Jewish defenders to make up for the lack of adequate British troops. Although this request was declined, Ze'ev Jabotinsky, together with Pinhas Rutenberg, led an effort to openly train Jewish volunteers in self-defense, an effort of which the Zionist Commission kept the British informed. Many of the volunteers were members of the Maccabi sports club and some of them were veterans of the Jewish Legion. Their month of training largely consisted of calisthenics and hand to hand combat with sticks. By the end of March, about 600 were said to be performing military drills daily in Jerusalem. Jabotinsky and Rutenberg also began organizing the collection of arms.

The Nebi Musa festival was an annual spring Muslim festival that began on the Friday before Good Friday and included a procession to the Nebi Musa shrine (tomb of Moses) near Jericho. It had apparently existed since the time of Saladin. Arab educator and essayist Khalil al-Sakakini described how tribes and caravans would come with banners and weapons. The Ottoman Turks usually deployed thousands of soldiers and even artillery to keep order in the narrow streets of Jerusalem during the Nebi Musa procession. However, Storrs issued a warning to Arab leaders, but deployed only 188 policemen.

== 4–7 April 1920, Old City ==
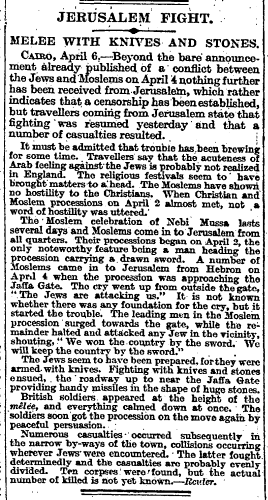
The Times report of the riots, Apr 08, 1920

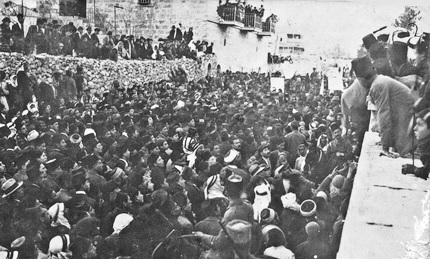
Arab demonstrators in front of the Jerusalem municipality building, 1920

By 10:30 a.m. on Sunday, 4 April 1920, 60,000–70,000 Arabs had congregated in the city square for the Nebi Musa festival, and groups had been attacking Jews in the Old City's alleys for over an hour. A speech marked by anti-Zionist rhetoric was delivered by Amin al-Husayni from the balcony of the Arab Club. Musa al-Husayni, his uncle, the mayor, was also with him and spoke from the municipal building's balcony in similar terms. According to testimony given by Fayyad al-Bakri to the Palin Commission, however, the rioting began when the Hebron banner he was holding while standing on Jaffa Street outside the Crédit Lyonnais Bank was spat on by a Jew and when the latter was pushed away, Jewish bystanders began throwing stones. According to historian Philip Mattar, however, while "[s]ome sources claim that Jews provoked the outbreak...there is no doubt the violence was a result of Arab hostility."

The editor of the newspaper Suriya al-Janubia (Southern Syria), Aref al-Aref, another Arab Club member, delivered a speech on horseback at the Jaffa Gate. The nature of his speech is disputed. According to Benny Morris, he said "If we don't use force against the Zionists and against the Jews, we will never be rid of them", while Bernard Wasserstein wrote "he seems to have co-operated with the police, and there is no evidence that he actively instigated violence". In fact, Wasserstein adds, "Zionist intelligence reports of this period are unanimous in stressing that he spoke repeatedly against violence", a point also documented by Yehoshua Porath.

The crowd reportedly shouted "Independence! Independence!" and "Palestine is our land, the Jews are our dogs!" Arab police joined in applause, and violence started. The local Arab population ransacked the Jewish Quarter of Jerusalem. The Torath Chaim Yeshiva was raided, and Torah scrolls were torn and thrown on the floor, and the building then set alight. During the next three hours, 160 Jews were injured.

Khalil al-Sakakini witnessed the eruption of violence in the Old City:

"[A] riot broke out, the people began to run about and stones were thrown at the Jews. The shops were closed and there were screams. ... I saw a Zionist soldier covered in dust and blood. ... Afterwards, I saw one Hebronite approach a Jewish shoeshine boy, who hid behind a sack in one of the wall's comers next to Jaffa Gate, and take his box and beat him over the head. He screamed and began to run, his head bleeding and the Hebronite left him and returned to the procession. ... The riot reached its zenith. All shouted, "Muhammad's religion was born with the sword". ... I immediately walked to the municipal garden. ... my soul is nauseated and depressed by the madness of humankind."

The British imposed a nighttime curfew on Sunday night and arrested several dozen Arab rioters, but on Monday morning they were allowed to attend morning prayers and were then released. Arabs continued to attack Jews and break into their homes, especially in Arab-majority mixed buildings. On Monday, as disturbances grew worse, the Old City was sealed off by British authorities and no one was allowed to exit the area. Martial law was declared, but looting, burglary, rape, and murder continued. Several homes were set on fire, and tombstones were shattered. British forces found that the majority of illicit weapons were concealed on the bodies of Arab women. On Monday evening, all forces were evacuated from the Old City, a step described in the Palin Report as "an error of judgment". Even with martial law, it took British authorities another four days to restore order.

The Old City's Jewish community had no training or weapons, and Jabotinsky's men had found themselves outside the walled Old City and were unable to enter it before the British sealed the area off. Two volunteers were able to enter the Jewish Quarter disguised as medical personnel to organize self-defense – using rocks and boiling water. Five Jews and four Arabs died in the riots. Two-hundred and sixteen Jews were injured, 18 critically, and 23 Arabs, one critically. About 300 Jews were evacuated from the Old City.

== Accusations of British complicity ==
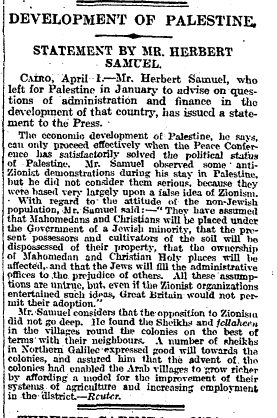
Reaction of the soon-to-appointed High Commissioner for Palestine, Herbert Samuel, on a visit to Palestine a few days prior to the riots. Published in The Times.

In Hebrew the incidents were described as meoraot, connoting targeted attacks reminiscent of what had often occurred especially in Russia, whereas Palestinian Arabs referred to them as an heroic witness to an 'Arab Revolt'. The use of the word pogrom to describe such outbreaks of communal violence bore with it the implication that the governing authorities, in this case the British administration, had actively connived in an anti-Jewish riot. The term drew an analogy between the classic form such actions took in Eastern Europe, where Jews were the victims of racist, anti-Semitic terror campaigns supported by the ruling authorities, with the situation in Palestine where Zionism was promoting a colonial adventure that was ethnically exclusive and challenged local Arab nationalist aspirations.

It was asserted soon after, by Chaim Weizmann and Lieutenant-colonel Richard Meinertzhagen, that Haj Amin al-Husseini had been put up to inciting the riot by Field Marshal Edmund Allenby's chief of staff, Colonel Bertie Harry Waters-Taylor, to demonstrate to the world that Arabs would not tolerate a Jewish homeland in Palestine. Their assertions were never substantiated, and Meinertzhagen was discharged.

The Zionist Commission noted that before the riots Arab milkmen started to demand their customers in Meah Shearim pay them on the spot, explaining that they would no longer be serving the Jewish neighbourhood. Christian storekeepers had marked their shops in advance with the sign of the cross so that they would not be mistakenly looted. A previous commission report also accused Storrs of inciting the Arabs, blaming him for sabotaging attempts to purchase the Western Wall as well. A petition circulated among American citizens and presented to their consul protested that British authorities had prevented Jews from defending themselves.

After the violence broke out, Ze'ev Jabotinsky met Military Governor Storrs and suggested deployment of his volunteers, but his request was rejected. Storrs confiscated his pistol and demanded to know the location of his other weapons, threatening to arrest him for possessing a firearm. Later, Storrs changed his mind and asked for 200 volunteers to report to the police headquarters to be sworn in as deputies. After they arrived and the administering of the oath had begun, orders came to cease and he sent them away. Arab volunteers had also been invited, and were likewise sent away.

On Sunday night, the first day of the riots, several dozen rioters were arrested, but on Monday morning they were allowed to attend morning prayers and were then released. On Monday evening, after martial law was declared, the soldiers were evacuated from the Old City, a step described in the Palin Report as "an error of judgment".

After the riots, Storrs visited Menachem Ussishkin, the new head of the Zionist Commission, to express "regrets for the tragedy that has befallen us".

- Ussishkin asked, "What tragedy?"

- "I mean the unfortunate events that have occurred here in the recent days", Storrs said.

- "His excellency means the pogrom", suggested Ussishkin.

When Storrs hesitated to categorize the events as such, Ussishkin replied,

- "You Colonel, are an expert on matters of management and I am an expert on the rules of pogroms."

The Palin Report noted that Jewish representatives persisted in describing the events as a "pogrom", implying that the British administration had connived in the violence.

== Palin Commission of Inquiry ==
The Palin Commission (or Palin Court of Inquiry), a committee of inquiry sent to the region in May 1920 by the British authorities, examined the reasons for this trouble. According to the Survey of Palestine:

Savage attacks were made by Arab rioters in Jerusalem on Jewish lives and property. Five Jews were killed and 211 injured. Order was restored by the intervention of British troops; four Arabs were killed and 21 injured. It was reported by a military commission of inquiry that the reasons for this trouble were:--

(a) Arab disappointment at the non-fulfilment of the promises of independence which they claimed had been given to them during the war.
(b) Arab belief that the Balfour Declaration implied a denial of the right of self-determination and their fear that the establishment of a National Home would mean a great increase in Jewish immigration and would lead to their economic and political subjection to the Jews.
(c) The aggravation of these sentiments on the one hand by propaganda from outside Palestine associated with the proclamation of the Emir Feisal as King of a re-united Syria and with the growth of Pan-Arab and Pan-Moslem ideas, and on the other hand by the activities of the Zionist Commission supported by the resources and influence of Jews throughout the world.

The Palin Report on the April riots was not signed until July 1920, after the San Remo conference and replacement of the British OETA by a High Commissioner, Sir Herbert Samuel. The Report was submitted in August 1920, though never published, and was critical of both sides.

The report blamed the Zionists, 'whose impatience to achieve their ultimate goal and indiscretion are largely responsible for this unhappy state of feeling’ and singled out Amin al-Husayni and Ze'ev Jabotinsky in particular. However, they incorrectly identified the anti-socialist Jabotinsky as organizer of the "definite Bolshevist" Poalei Zion ('Zionist Workers') party.

The report was critical of some of the actions of OETA military command, particularly the withdrawal of troops from inside Jerusalem early on the morning of Monday, 5 April and that, once martial law had been proclaimed, it was slow to regain control.

== Aftermath ==
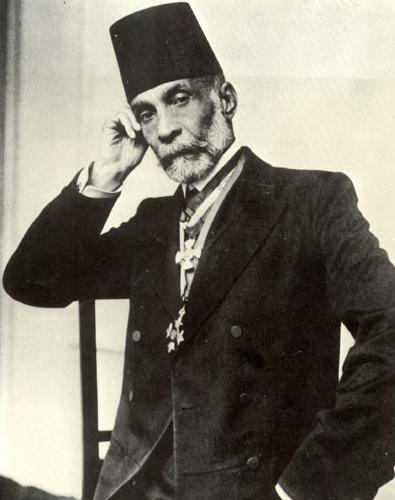
Musa Kazim al-Husayni, the mayor of Jerusalem, was dismissed by the British after the April riots.

Over 200 people were put on trial as a result of the riots, including 39 Jews. Musa Kazim al-Husayni was replaced as mayor by the head of the rival Nashashibi clan, Ragheb Bey Nashashibi. Amin al-Husayni and Aref al-Aref were arrested for incitement, but when they were let out on bail they both escaped to Syria. In another version, al-Aref was warned and escaped before being arrested. In their absence, a military court sentenced them to 10 years imprisonment.

The Arab riots were publicly protested by sheikhs from 82 villages in the Jerusalem and Jaffa areas who issued a formal statement saying that, in their view, Zionist settlement was not a danger to their communities. Similar declarations would be repeated in cablegrams sent to London in 1922, as hundreds of sheikhs and mukhtars lent their authority and support to Jewish immigration. The tenor of these positions was that such immigration would, as the Zionist movement itself affirmed, improve the lives of Arabs as industrial development progressed. The sheikhs protesting the riots, and telegramming later the British colonial secretary to express solidarity with the Zionist programme were sometimes bribed to state this position by the World Zionist Organisation. Their opinions were procured. British soldiers were sent to search Jews for arms at the demand of the Palestinian Arab leadership. They searched the offices and apartments of Chaim Weizmann, the head of the Zionist Commission, and Jabotinsky. At Jabotinsky's house, they found three rifles, two pistols, and 250 rounds of ammunition. Nineteen men were arrested, but not Jabotinsky, who went to the jail of his own volition to insist on his arrest. A military judge released him because he had not been home when the guns were discovered, but he was again arrested a few hours later. Jabotinsky was convicted of possessing the pistol that Storrs had confiscated on the riot's first day, among other things. The primary witness was none other than Ronald Storrs, who said he "did not remember" being told about the self-defence organization. He was sentenced to 15 years' imprisonment and sent to Egypt, though the next day he was returned to Acre Prison. Jabotinsky's trial and sentencing created an uproar, and were protested by London press including The Times and questioned in the British Parliament. Even before the editorials appeared, the commander of British forces in Palestine and Egypt, General Congreve, wrote Field Marshal Wilson that Jews were sentenced far more severely than Arabs who had committed worse offences. He reduced Jabotinsky's sentence to a year, and that of the other 19 Jews arrested with him to six months.

The new civilian government under Herbert Samuel granted a general amnesty in early 1921. However, Amin al-Husayni and Aref al-Aref were excluded from the amnesty because they had fled before their convictions had been passed down. Samuel pardoned Amin in March 1921 and appointed him Mufti of Jerusalem. When the Supreme Muslim Council was created in the following year, Husayni demanded and received the title Grand Mufti, a position which came with life tenure. Also, General Storrs became the civil governor of Jerusalem under the new administration.

As the riots began, Jewish immigration to Palestine was temporarily halted by the British. Also, feeling that the British were unwilling to defend Jewish settlements from continuous Arab attacks, Palestinian Jews set up self-defense units, which came to be called the Haganah ("defense"). Furthermore, the riots increased the feeling of Palestinian nationalism within the Palestinian Arab community.

== See also ==
- Arab nationalism
- Palestinian nationalism
- Killing of Moshe Barsky, the first kibbutz member killed in Arab attack
- Anti-Zionism
- Timeline of Jewish History
- Intercommunal conflict in Mandatory Palestine
