= Kamel al-Budeiri =

Palestinian politician and militant (1882–1923)

- كامل البديري

District Commissioner of Ramla

Personal details
- Born: Muhammad Kāmil ibn Wahba al-Shāfiʿī al-Muqaddasī al-Budayrī; 1882 Jerusalem, Ottoman Empire
- Died: 1923 (aged 40–41) Wadi Rum, between Mandatory Palestine and the Emirate of Transjordan

Muhammad Kāmil ibn Wahba al-Shāfiʿī al-Muqaddasī al-Budayrī (Arabic: محمد كامل بن وهبة الشافعي المقدسي البديري; 1882–1923), known as simply Kamel al-Budeiri, was a Palestinian Arab politician and militant active in the early 20th century.

Born in Jerusalem, during the Ottoman rule of Palestine Al-Budeiri served as a district commissioner of Ramla. He was arrested by the British Mandate government upon coming back from a trip to Egypt after he was tipped by the Austrian Jewish agent Sarah Herinson as affiliated with the Arab resistance at the time, before releasing him a few months later.

As the years 1918 to 1922 witnessed the rising of the Arab National Movement in Jerusalem, Jaffa, Haifa, Acre and Nablus, Al-Budeiri joined Amin al-Husseini, his brother Fakhri al-Husseini, Ishaaq Darweesh, Ibrahim Darweesh, Jamal al-Husayni, Aref al-Aref, and Sheikh Hassan Abu Al-So'oud in establishing the Arab Club. In October 1921, Al-Budeiri founded the Al Sabah (Arabic for 'The Morning') newspaper on behalf of the Palestine Arab Congress. He was succeeded as editor-in-chief by Yousef Yassin and later Hani Abu Musleh. Al Sabah was the media front of the Arab Palestinian conference and succeeded the newspaper Suriyya al-Janubiyya.

Al Sabah was published until 1923, when Kamel al-Budeiri left Jerusalem and crossed to Transjordan to meet the Saudi princes of Najd and update them on the latest developments in Jerusalem and unify positions on rejecting the Balfour Declaration and the Zionist intentions of establishing a Jewish state in Palestine. He carried on him pictures of Al-Aqsa Mosque and the Dome of the Rock with the Star of David placed on its then bronze dome. He took a Bedouin guide from the Howeitat tribe to escort him through the Jordanian deserts to Najd, where he was assassinated in Wadi Rum in what seems to be part of the tribal conflict between the Hashemites and the Saudis during and after the Arab Revolt.
