= Philip Palin =

Major-General Sir Philip Palin KCMG CB
- Palin in 1919
- Born: 8 August 1864; Edinburgh, Scotland
- Died: 22 January 1937 (aged 72); Hove, England
- Burial place: Hove Cemetery
- Military career
- Allegiance: United Kingdom
- Branch: British Army; British Indian Army
- Service years: 1886–1921
- Rank: Major-General
- Units: Royal Welch Fusiliers; Cheshire Regiment; 14th King George's Own Ferozepore Sikhs
- Commands: 29th Indian Brigade; 75th Division; 3rd (Lahore) Division
- Conflicts: Third Anglo-Burmese War; North-West Frontier; First Hazara Expedition; Waziristan Expedition; Tochi Expedition; World War I; Gallipoli campaign; Sinai and Palestine campaign
- Awards: Companion of the Order of the Bath (1916); Knight Commander of the Order of St Michael and St George (1919); Eight Mentions in Despatches; Order of Karageorge; Order of the Nile; Honorary Colonel, 1st Battalion, 11th Sikh Regiment
- Other work: President, Palin Commission (1920)

Major-General Sir Philip Charles Palin KCMG CB (8 August 1864 – 22 January 1937) was an officer of the British Indian Army who served in frontier campaigns and then commanded British, Indian and South African troops in Egypt, Gallipoli and Palestine during World War I. Postwar he chaired an inquiry into the Arab–Jewish conflict in Jerusalem.

== Early life ==
Philip Charles Palin was born in Edinburgh on 8 August 1864, the son of Lieutenant General C. T. Palin of the Bombay Army. Philip and two of his brothers followed their father into the Indian Army.

He was educated at Clifton College and then entered the British Army by the Militia 'back door' (rather than through the Royal Military College at Sandhurst), being commissioned as a subaltern, with the rank of lieutenant, into the 3rd (Royal Denbigh and Flint Militia) Battalion of the Royal Welsh Fusiliers (later the Royal Welch Fusiliers), on 9 January 1884. On 28 April 1886 he received a commission in the Regular Army as a lieutenant in the Cheshire Regiment.

== Early military career ==
=== Burma and India ===
Palin joined the 2nd Battalion, Cheshire Regiment in Burma and saw active service in the latter stages of the Third Anglo-Burmese War. Then on 15 June 1888 he transferred to the Indian Staff Corps and was appointed to 14th King George's Own Ferozepore Sikhs. He served with the regiment on the Hazara Expedition of 1888, the Waziristan Expedition of 1894–95 and the Tochi Field Force of 1897–98 on the North-West Frontier. He was promoted to Captain in 1897 and served for five years (1899–1904) as permanent adjutant of the three battalions of the Calcutta Volunteer Rifles.

Having been promoted to major in 1904, Palin reached the rank of lieutenant colonel in April 1912, and was appointed to command the 15th Ludhiana Sikhs.

== First World War ==
By the outbreak of the First World War in the summer of 1914 Palin had transferred to command his own regiment, the 14th Sikhs. The regiment joined the 29th Indian Brigade in October 1914 and went with it to Egypt. After defeating a Turkish raid on the Suez Canal in February 1915, the brigade was sent to Gallipoli in April 1915.

=== Gallipoli ===
The brigade landed at Cape Helles on the Gallipoli peninsula where Palin and his Sikhs took part in the Second and Third Battles of Krithia. In the Second Battle, the 14th Sikhs were in reserve as the Anzacs attacked. In the Third Battle, the 29th Indian Brigade under Major General Herbert Cox attacked along Gully Spur and Gully Ravine; the Sikhs, advancing along the Gully floor, suffered especially heavily. The bombardment had been inadequate and the Turkish defences were intact. 'The result was that, though the 14th Sikhs on the right flank pushed on despite losses amounting to three-fourths of their effectives, the centre of the Brigade could make no headway'.

In 29 August Indian Brigade was secretly moved from Helles to ANZAC Cove, but were greeted by shellfire on landing on 5 August, and part of the 14th Sikhs had to wait until the next night to land. They then took part in the Battle of Sari Bair on 7 August alongside Australian troops, all under Cox's command. Palin commanded one of the four attacking columns, but like Cox and the other commanders was provided with no staff and the objectives set for them were beyond attainment. 14th Sikhs got onto Rhododendron Spur and made contact with 4th Australian Brigade on their flank. The Australians were ordered to go on with the Sikhs and assault Hill 305 (Koja Chemen Tepe), but it was found to be impossible. In the subsequent attempt to capture Hill 60, the artillery preparation was again inadequate, casualties were very heavy, and the objective remained untaken.

Hill 60 was the last major British attack of the Gallipoli campaign. The fighting settled down to trench warfare until the British evacuated the peninsula in December 1915 and January 1916. Total casualties for the 14th Sikhs during the Gallipoli campaign were 264 killed and 840 wounded – more than the normal establishment of the regiment. Palin, however, survived, and when Cox was wounded, Palin was promoted to the temporary rank of brigadier general on 25 September 1915 to succeed him.

=== Egypt and Palestine ===
Palin continued in command of the 29th Indian Brigade in Egypt after the evacuation of Gallipoli. He was promoted to brevet colonel in November 1915. His brigade was stationed in defence of the Suez Canal, and in November 1916 he led out a column to drive off a Turkish detachment. In February 1917 he was appointed to command the Southern Sector of the Suez Canal defences.

On 25 June 1917 Palin was promoted to the temporary rank of major general to command the 75th Division, a new formation being created within the Egyptian Expeditionary Force (EEF) from British Territorial Force (TF) infantry battalions arriving as reinforcements from India. The War Office in London had changed its policy and decided to include some Indian battalions as well, and these initially came from Palin's old 29th Indian Brigade. A year later the 75th Division was 'Indianised' like several other nominally British divisions in the EEF, so that each brigade comprised one British and three Indian battalions, the other British battalions being sent to the Western Front. One of 75th Division's three field artillery brigades was composed of South Africans.

The 75th Division under Palin joined XXI Corps and took part in the invasion of Palestine, beginning with the Third Battle of Gaza on 27 October 1917, leading to the capture of Gaza (6–7 November) and Junction Station (13–14 November), the advance through the Judean Hills and the Battle of Nebi Samwil (20–24 November). In the spring of 1918 the division was involved in the actions at Tell 'Asur (11–12 March) and Berukin (9–11 April). In June Palin's rank of major general was made substantive.

In the summer of 1918, 75th Division joined General Sir Edmund Allenby's final offensive (the Battles of Megiddo). At the Battle of Sharon (19 September), 75th Division successfully assaulted Miske and the Turkish trench system around the village of Et Tire. For this attack Palin also had under his command 'A' Squadron (Duke of Lancaster's Own Yeomanry) and 2nd Light Armoured Motor Battery, Machine Gun Corps, which he sent up with his chief of staff to outflank the village. By 17.00, XXI Corps' attack had rolled up the whole Turkish right and allowed the Desert Mounted Corps to sweep forward to complete the envelopment of the Turkish army and begin the pursuit.

=== Postwar ===
After the end of the fighting on 19 September, Palin's 75th Division was left on salvage work and road repair until the Armistice with the Turks was signed on 31 October.

Demobilisation began early in 1919, but 75th Division was selected for the Army of Occupation of Palestine. In March 1919 it returned to garrison duty in Egypt, where Palin became responsible for the Eastern Delta, which was renamed 75th Division Area. Many other units were attached to his headquarters for this work. After July 1919 the disturbances in Egypt began to die down, and units began to disperse to their home countries. On 1 April 1920 the Division Area and remaining troops were handed over to 10th (Irish) Division and 75th Division ceased to exist.

=== Awards ===
Palin was awarded the CB in 1916 and the CMG in 1918, and in 1919 he was knighted (KCMG). During the war he had been mentioned in despatches eight times. He was also awarded the Serbian Order of Karageorge and the Egyptian Order of the Nile.

In January 1920 Palin was appointed colonel of his old regiment, the 14th Sikhs (later 1st Battalion 11th Sikh Regiment).

== The Palin Commission ==
On completing the disbandment of 75th Division, Palin became commander of 3rd (Lahore) Division, a Regular Indian Army formation in the Palestine occupation force. Shortly after taking up this command, he was appointed to chair a Commission of Inquiry into the Jerusalem riots that had occurred on 4–7 April 1920. The other members of the Commission were Brig-Gen E.H. Wildblood (one of his former brigadiers in 75th Division) and Lt-Col C. Vaughan Edwards. Assisted by a legal adviser, they sat for 50 days and examined 152 witnesses in eight languages.

The Palin Commission's report was submitted in August 1920 but was never published, despite Allenby's recommendation that it should be. The report highlights the conflict between the promises of the 1917 Balfour Declaration on a Jewish homeland, which had encouraged Jewish immigration to Palestine, and of an Inter-Allied Commission to inquire into Palestinian self-determination, which was never fully formed.

== Private life ==
Palin retired from the army in 1921. In 1899 he had married Diamantine Harriet, daughter of Lt-Col G. Elliot of the 18th Royal Irish Regiment. They had no children, and after she died in 1934 he was remarried (1935) to Gladys, widow of Dr John Love. Palin died on 22 January 1937 at his home at 7 Cromwell Road, Hove, Sussex. His funeral took place on 25 January at Holy Trinity Church, Hove, and he was buried at Hove Cemetery.
