= Aref al-Aref =

Palestinian journalist, historian and politician (1891–1973)

- عارف العارف
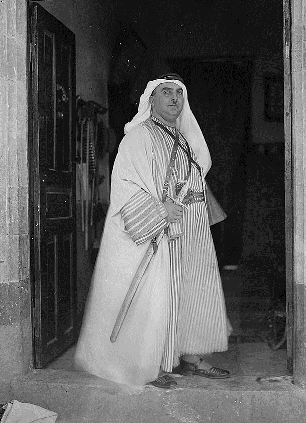

Mayor of East Jerusalem
- In office 1949–1955

Military Governor of Ramallah Governorate

Personal details
- Born: 1892 Jerusalem, Ottoman Empire
- Died: 30 July 1973 (aged 80–81) Al-Bireh, West Bank
- Education: Mulkiyya College in Istanbul
- Occupation: Journalist, historian, politician

Aref al-Aref (Arabic: عارف العارف; 1892–1973) was a Palestinian journalist, historian and politician. Born in Jerusalem in 1891, he studied in Constantinople (Istanbul) and joined Al-Muntada al-Adabi (The Literary Club) until he joined the Ottoman army during World War I. He was captured and spent three years in a prisoner-of-war camp in Krasnoyarsk, Siberia, from where he escaped after the Russian Revolution and returned to Palestine. He served as mayor of East Jerusalem in the 1950s during the Jordanian annexation of the West Bank.

== Biography ==
=== Early life ===
Aref al-Aref was born in 1892 as Aref Shehadeh in Jerusalem, then part of the Ottoman Empire. His father was a vegetable vendor. Excelling at his studies in primary school, he was sent to the Marjan Preparatory School and Mulkiyya College in Constantinople (Istanbul). During his college studies, he wrote for a Turkish newspaper. Later, he worked as a translator for the Ministry of Foreign Affairs. He served as an officer in the Ottoman Army in World War I. He was captured on the Caucasus front and spent three years in a prisoner of war camp in Krasnoyarsk, Siberia, where, he learned Russian from the Russian officers and soldiers who were digging the camp, and he also learned German from the German and Austrian prisoners who were with him in captivity. In Krasnoyarsk, he edited a newspaper in handwritten Arabic called Nakatullah [Camel of God] and translated Ernst Haeckel's Die Weltraethsel ("The Riddles of the Universe") into Turkish. After the Russian Revolution and news spread of the Arab Revolt, he convinced twenty-one Arab prisoners to escape from the prison to join the ranks of the revolution. They escaped and took the route of Manchuria, Japan, China, and Egypt via the Red Sea. During this long journey, the truce was declared and the war ended. He returned in 1918 to what had become British-occupied Mandatory Palestine.

=== Political activism ===
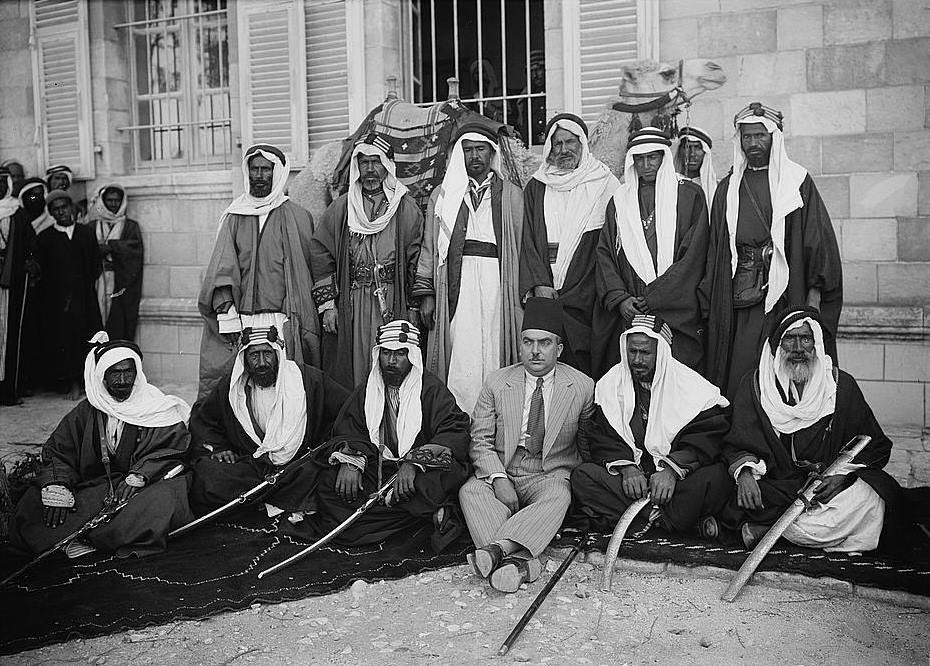
Aref al-Aref (seated, center), as District Administrative Officer of Bir al-Saba', later renamed to Beersheba, during British rule of Palestine.

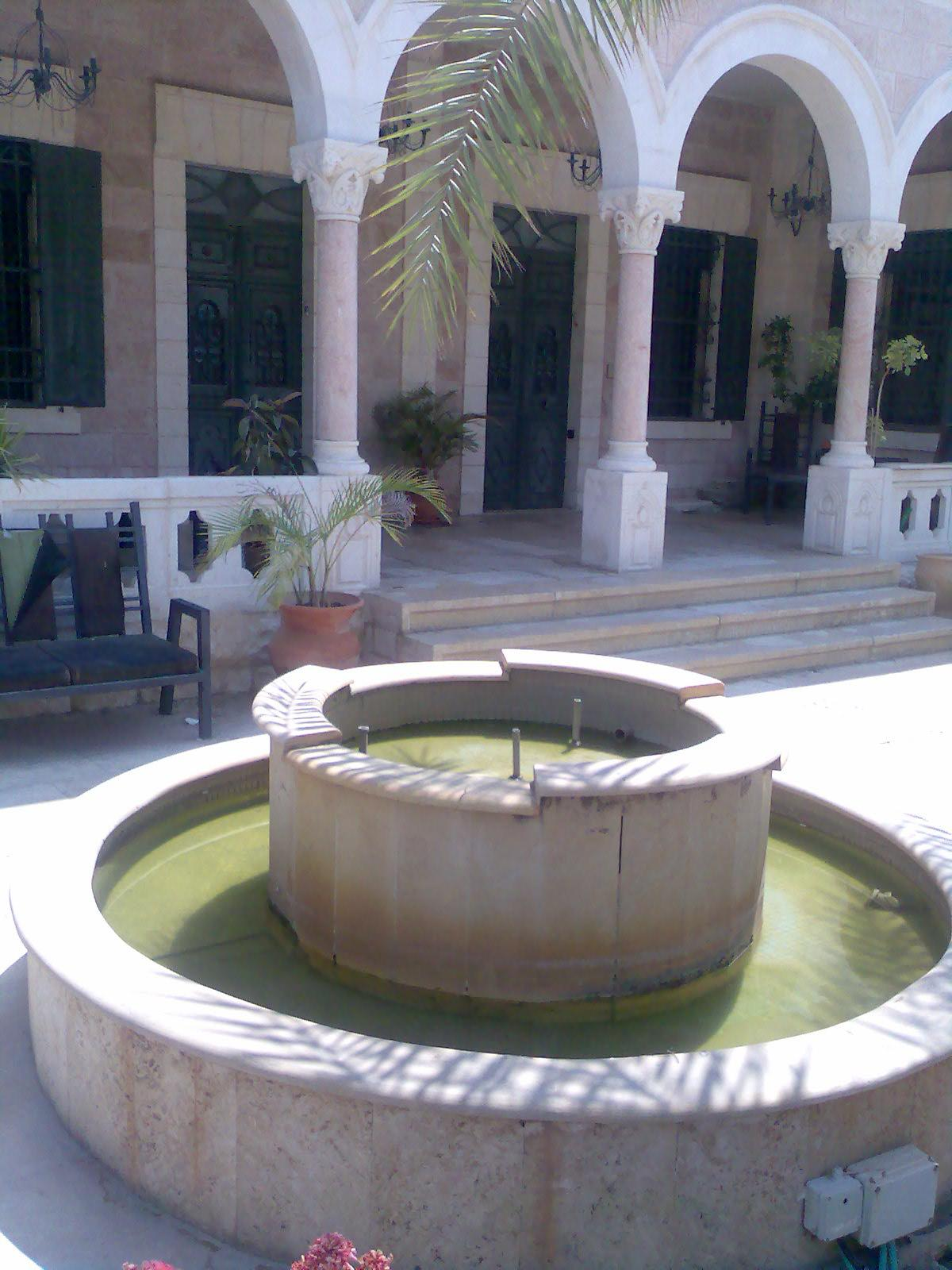
Home of Aref al-Aref, Beersheba

By 1919, al-Aref was involved in political activism in Palestine, agitating for unity of Palestine with Syria. In October 1919, he became editor of the recently established newspaper Suriya al-Janubiya (Southern Syria), which was the first Arab nationalist newspaper published in Jerusalem and was an organ of the al-Nadi al-'Arabi (The Arab Club). Initially the paper supported the British military authorities, but soon became an opponent of the British Mandate.

Al-Aref attended the Nebi Musa religious festival in Jerusalem in 1920 riding on his horse, and gave a speech at the Jaffa Gate. The nature of his speech is disputed. According to Benny Morris, he said "If we don't use force against the Zionists and against the Jews, we will never be rid of them", while Bernard Wasserstein wrote "he seems to have cooperated with the police, and there is no evidence that he actively instigated violence". In fact, "Zionist intelligence reports of this period are unanimous in stressing that he spoke repeatedly against violence". Soon the festival became a riot involving attacks on the local Jews. Al-Aref was arrested for incitement, but when he was let out on bail he escaped to Syria together with co-accused Haj Amin al-Husseini. In another version, he was warned and escaped before being arrested. He advised Arabs against violence, urging them instead to adopt the "discipline, silence, and courage" of their opponents. In his absence, a military court sentenced him to 10 years imprisonment.

In Damascus, al-Aref became a deputy to the General Syrian Congress and with Hajj Amin and others formed al-Jam'iyya al-'Arabiyya al-Filastiniyya (Palestinian Arab Society). He became its Secretary-General and campaigned against the decisions of the San Remo conference. After the French invasion of Syria in July 1920, he fled to Transjordan. He returned to Jerusalem late in 1920 after being pardoned by the new British High Commissioner for Palestine, Herbert Samuel, but the government refused to allow his newspaper to reopen.

Al-Aref helped in popularizing the term "Nakba", in his encyclopaedic research Nakbat Filastin wa al-Firdaws al-Mafqud:1947-1955 (The Palestinian Nakba and the Lost Paradise: 1947–1955), In it, he chronicled the events from the November 29, 1947, Partition Plan proposal through the intense battles of 1947/48 and their aftermath, up to 1955. In its introduction, he argued for the need to designate the events following the Partition Plan—what befell the Arabs in general, and the Palestinians in particular—as the 'Nakba' (catastrophe), stating:

How can I not call it [the Nakba]? During this period we have been stricken by catastrophe, we, the society of Arabs in general, and the Palestinians in particular, as we have not been stricken for centuries and epochs: we have been deprived of our homeland, expelled from our homes, and have lost a great number of our people our own flesh and blood, and, above all, have been struck at the very core of our dignity.

=== Political career ===
In 1921, he was appointed as a district Officer of the British administration by the Civil Secretary, Colonel Wyndham Deedes. He served in that capacity in Jenin, Nablus, Beisan, and Jaffa. In 1926 he was seconded to the Government of Transjordan as Chief Secretary, where he served for three years. However he continued his political activities on the side to the displeasure of his British superior. He returned to Palestine in 1929, where he served as District Officer in Beersheba and later in Gaza. In 1933 he received a special commendation from the High Commissioner for keeping his district quiet during a time of disturbances elsewhere. In 1942 he was promoted and transferred to al-Bireh. He continued as a Mandate official until 1948.

Upon Jordanian control of the West Bank, al-Aref was first appointed military governor of Ramallah governorate, and then, from 1949 to 1955, served as mayor of East Jerusalem. In 1967, he was appointed director of the Palestine Archaeological Museum (Rockefeller Museum) in Jerusalem.

Aref al-Aref died on 30 July 1973, in al-Bireh.

== Published works ==
All following books have been published in Arabic, unless mentioned otherwise, and the English titles are literal translations of the Arabic ones.

- [The] Bedouin Law/Bedouin Judiciary (Al Qadaa bayn al Badou), 1933; new edition published in Beirut, 2001
- History of Beersheba and its Tribes (Tarikh B’ir al-Sabi‘ wa Qabailiha), Jerusalem 1934. Probably identical with "The Bedouin Love, Law and Legend: History of Beersheba and Its Tribes", 1934
- My Vision (Ru'yay), Jerusalem 1943
- History of Gaza (Tarikh Ghazza), Jerusalem 1943
- Gazan-Jerusalemite History (Tarigh Ghaza-Al Quds), Jerusalem 1943
- 'Aref el-'Aref, in collaboration with/editor Harold W. Tilley, in English. Bedouin Love, Law and Legend, Dealing Exclusively with the Badu of Beersheba. Jerusalem 1944. Also listed as Bedouin Love, Law and Legend: History of Beersheba and Its Tribes.
- History of al-Haram al-Sharif (Tarikh al-Haram al-Sharif or Tarikh al-Haram al-Qudsi), Jerusalem 1947
- History of Jerusalem (Tarikh al-Quds), Cairo 1951 and/or Summary of the History of Jerusalem (Al Mijaz fi Tarikh al Quds), Cairo 1951
- The Disaster (al-Nakba), six vols., 1956–1961. Also listed as The catastrophe: The catastrophe of Jerusalem and the lost paradise (al-Nakba: Nakbat Bayt al-Maqdis wal-firdaws al-mafqud)
- The Detailed History of Jerusalem (al-Mufassal fi Tarikh al-Quds), Jerusalem 1961

== Bibliography ==
- Fischbach, Michael R. (2005). "Arif al-Arif". In Mattar, Philip (ed.). Encyclopedia of the Palestinians. Facts on File Library of World History. Infobase Publishing. p. 81. ISBN 9780816069866.
- Morris, Benny (2011). Righteous Victims: A History of the Zionist-Arab Conflict, 1881-1998. Knopf Doubleday. p. 95. ISBN 9780307788054., quoting the official history of the Haganah
- Tamari, Salim; Turjman, Ihsan Salih (2011). A Soldier's Diary and the Erasure of Palestine's Ottoman Past. California University Press. ISBN 9780520259553.
- Tauber, Eliezer (2013) [1995 (Frank Cass Publ.)]. The Formation of Modern Syria and Iraq. London: Routledge. pp. 95, 105. ISBN 9781135201258. Very limited access to the text on Google Books.
- Wasserstein, Bernard (1977). "'Clipping the Claws of the Colonisers': Arab Officials in the Government of Palestine, 1917-48". Middle Eastern Studies. 13 (2): 171–194. doi:10.1080/00263207708700343.
