= Palin Commission =

British inquiry that probed into the 1920 Jerusalem riots

The Palin Commission or Palin Commission of Inquiry or Palin Court of Inquiry was a British Royal Commission convened to investigate the cause of the 1920 Jerusalem riots, which took place between April 4, 1920 and April 7, 1920. The Commission was also tasked with investigating “the extent and causes of racial feelings that at present exist in Palestine”.

The Commission completed its report on July 1, 1920 at Port Said.

The Commission reported that the prelude to the attacks resulted from Arab disappointment at the non-fulfillment of the promises of independence by British authorities, the belief that the Balfour Declaration implied a denial of the Arab right of self-determination, and fear that the establishment of a national home for Jews would result in a significant increase in Jewish immigration, leading to Arab economic and political subjugation.

The Commission’s final report was never published, in anticipation of Zionist objections.

The report is held in the Foreign Office papers at the National Archives as document E9379 under FO 371/5121.

== Commission operations ==
The commission consisted of three senior military officers; Major General Sir Philip Palin, Brigadier General E. H. Wildblood, and Lieutenant Colonel C. Vaughan Edwards. The Commission convened for 50 days, and examined 152 witnesses in eight languages (English, French, Arabic, Hebrew, Yiddish, Jargon, Russian and Hindustani).

The Zionist Commission was legally represented by S. Alexander of the firm of R.S. Devonshire & Co., Advocates, and used the inquiry to make a "vigorous attack" upon the departing Occupied Enemy Territory Administration (OETA). The Report noted that Jewish representatives persisted in describing the events as a "pogrom", implying that the British administration had connived in the violence. In contrast, the Commission noted that Arab Palestinians rarely attended the court.

By the time the Report was presented in August 1920, the OETA had been replaced by a civilian administration. Sir Herbert Samuel was appointed the first High Commissioner in 1920, before the Council of the League of Nations approved a British Mandate for Palestine, and OETA withdrew to Cairo in preparation for the expected British Mandate. Edmund Allenby advised that the Palin Report should be published; but in anticipation of Zionist objections, it was decided only to convey the gist of the report verbally to a "responsible" Zionist leader.

== Summary ==
The Report refers to various "causes of the alienation and exasperation of the feelings of the population of Palestine". It cites Jean de la Fontaine's lines in the original French to describe the attitude of the Zionists towards the local Arab population:

Cet animal est très méchant. Si on l'attaque il se défend.

Translation:

This animal is vicious. When we attack, it defends.

The Report was sharply critical of the Zionists for exacerbating Arab concerns by their "impatience, indiscretion and attempts to force the hands of the Administration" into establishing a Jewish State, as there had been direct communication between the Foreign Office and the Chief Political Officer, Colonel Richard Meinertzhagen, bypassing and sometimes contradicting the OETA.

Lastly, the report expressed its alarm about the situation in Palestine, calling it "exceedingly dangerous".

The Report concludes as follows:

The following are the considered opinions submitted by the Court:

1. That the causes of the alienation and exasperation of the feelings of the population of Palestine are:
  1. Disappointment at the non-fulfilment of promises made to them by British propaganda.
  2. Inability to reconcile the Allies' declared policy of self-determination with the Balfour Declaration, giving rise to a sense of betrayal and intense anxiety for their future.
  3. Misapprehension of the true meaning of the Balfour Declaration and forgetfulness of the guarantees determined therein, due to the loose rhetoric of politicians and the exaggerated statements and writings of interested persons, chiefly Zionists.
  4. Fear of Jewish competition and domination, justified by experience and the apparent control exercised by the Zionists over the Administration. Zionist indiscretion and aggression, since the Balfour Declaration aggravating such fears.
  5. Anti-British and anti-Zionist propaganda working on the population already inflamed by the sources of irritation aforesaid.
2. That the Zionist Commission and the official Zionists by their impatience, indiscretion and attempts to force the hands of the Administration, are largely responsible for the present crisis.
3. That the Administration prior to the riots on the whole maintained under difficult circumstances an attitude of equal justice to all parties and that the allegations of bias put forward by both sides, Arab and Zionist, are unfounded.
4. That the Administration was considerably hampered in its policy by the direct interference of the Home Authorities, and particularly by the fact that the late Chief Political Officer, Colonel Meinertzhagen, acted as a direct channel of communication with the Foreign Office independent of the High Commissioner and submitted to the Foreign Office, advice, not only independent of the High Commissioner, but at times contrary to the latter's considered opinion.
5. That the non-publication of the Foreign Office declaration of policy, though rejected for serious reasons, was an error. That although the deliberation over a policy of accepting the Emir Feisal as titular King of Palestine might have aggravated the local situation, had it become publicly known, there is not sufficient evidence to show whether it did so become known to other than the Zionists, who undoubtedly were alarmed at it.
6. That the Military Governorate of Jerusalem failed to make adequate preparations for a possible disturbance at the Nebi Musa Pilgrimage in spite of the receipt of warnings and ample knowledge of the situation, such failure being probably due to over confidence induced by the success of the police authorities in handling earlier demonstrations.
7. That in spite of the prohibition of political demonstrations no definite instructions were issued by the Military Governorate to the police to prevent the delivery of inflammatory speeches on the occasion of the Nebi Musa pilgrimage.
8. That the decision to withdraw the troops from inside the city at 6 a.m. on Monday, April 5, whoever was responsible for it, was an error of judgement.
9. That the Military were slow in obtaining full control of the city after Martial Law had been proclaimed.
10. That the situation at present obtaining in Palestine is exceedingly dangerous and demands firm and patient handling if a serious catastrophe is to be avoided.

The Palin findings are similar to those of the Haycraft Report of the following year. The latter report gave more emphasis to the Arab fear that extensive Jewish immigration would lead to Palestine becoming a Jewish dominion.

== See also ==
- Zionism
- Anti-Zionism
- Timeline of Zionism
- 1920 Palestine riots
