= Joseph Trumpeldor =

Russian Zionist activist (1880–1920)

- יוֹסֵף טְרוּמְפֶּלְדוֹר
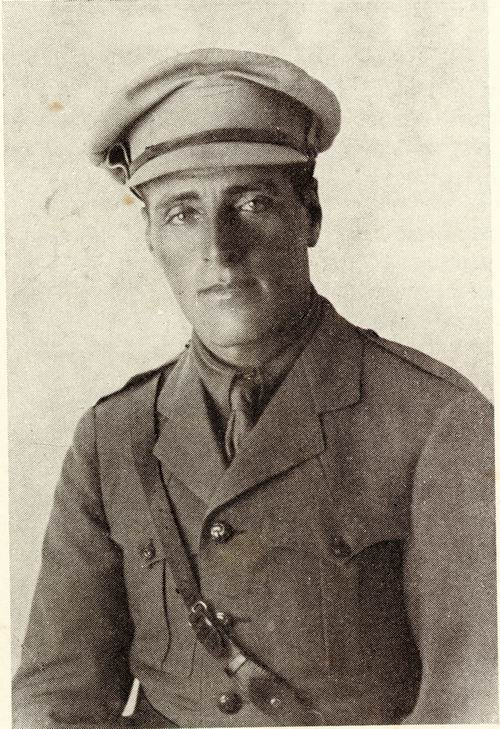
- Trumpeldor in c. 1904–1905
- Born: Joseph Vladimirovich Trumpeldor; November 21, 1880; Pyatigorsk, Russian Empire
- Died: March 1, 1920 (aged 39); Tel Hai, Occupied Enemy Territory Administration
- Spouse: Fira (Esther) Rozov (former fiancée)
- Military career
- Allegiance: Russian Empire; British Empire; Yishuv
- Branch: Imperial Russian Army; British Army; Haganah
- Service years: 1902–1905 (Russian Army); 1915–1916 (British Army); 1919–1920 (Haganah); 1919–1920 (HaShomer)
- Rank: Captain
- Units: 27th Siberian Infantry Regiment (Russian Army); Zion Mule Corps (British Army); Haganah units (Yishuv)
- Commands: Zion Mule Corps (Deputy Commander), Tel Hai (Commander)
- Conflicts: Russo-Japanese War; Siege of Port Arthur (WIA); World War I; Battle of Gallipoli (WIA); Intercommunal conflict in Mandatory Palestine; Battle of Tel Hai †
- Awards: Cross of St. George (4th and 3rd Class);
- Memorials: Trumpeldor National Memorial, Tel Hai; Statues and plaques commemorating his heroism across Israel
- Other work: Leader of "Bnei Zion Captives in Japan"; Formation of Zion Mule Corps; Establishment of HeHalutz; Advocacy for Jewish self-defense and Zionism

Joseph Vladimirovich (Volfovich) Trumpeldor (Hebrew: יוֹסֵף טְרוּמְפֶּלְדוֹר, IPA: [joˈsef tʁumpelˈdoʁ]; Russian: Иосиф Владимирович [Вольфович] Трумпельдор, IPA: [ɪˈosʲɪf trʊmpʲɪlʲˈdor]; November 21, 1880 – March 1, 1920 (Note: 12 Adar 5680 according to the Hebrew calendar; he was wounded that day, but died after sunset.)) was a Russian Zionist activist who helped organize the Zion Mule Corps and bring Jewish immigrants to Palestine. He was killed while defending the settlement of Tel Hai in 1920 and subsequently became a Jewish national hero. According to a standard account, his last words were "It's nothing, it is good to die for our country".

== Early life ==
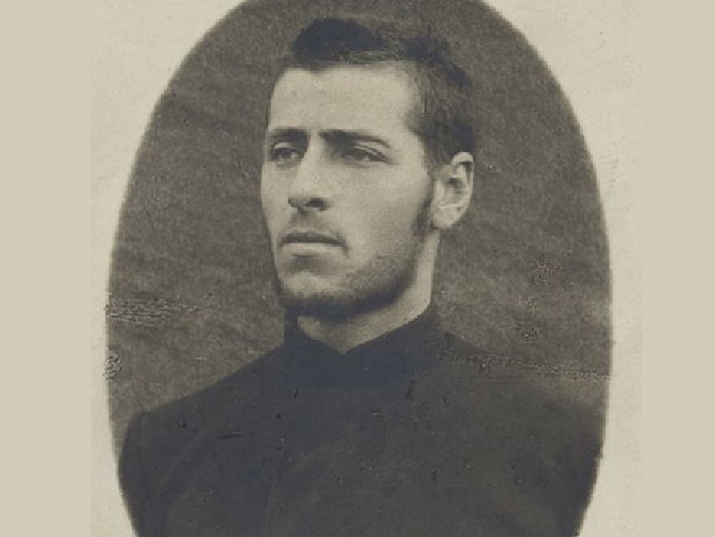
Trumpeldor as a young man

Joseph Trumpeldor was born in Pyatigorsk in the Caucasus to Vladimir Wolf (Ze'ev). Wolf was born in the city of Parczew in Congress Poland, the son of Shmuel Asher, a rabbi. At the age of 13, Wolf was kidnapped as a Cantonist and forced into service in the Russian Imperial Army, where he served for many years as a combat medic. His surname, "Trumpeldor", was likely given to him by his military officers in an effort to distance him from his Jewish religion. Despite his difficult experiences, Wolf did not assimilate, unlike many other Cantonists. Shortly before his discharge, he held a ceremony to inaugurate a Torah scroll at his place of service, which received attention even in Vilnius and was reported in HaKarmel. Wolf married twice. His second wife was Fedusia Axelvant, an educated woman who was distant from Judaism, with whom he had seven children, the fourth being Joseph. The latter was raised by his father with Jewish national pride, loyalty to Judaism, to the Tsar, the Russian army, and their homeland Russia. The language spoken in the family was Russian, not the Yiddish that was commonly spoken among Russian Jews at that time.

Trumpeldor grew up in the city of Rostov-on-Don. At the age of seven, he briefly studied in a Talmud Torah school and later attended the municipal school in Rostov-on-Don, where he excelled in his studies. At the age of 14, influenced by the teachings of Tolstoy, he became a vegetarian and a pacifist. He took exams to enter a real gymnasium (high school), passed successfully, but was not accepted due to the Numerus Clausus, which limited the number of Jews allowed to enroll. Due to the need to learn a trade, he returned to Pyatigorsk, to his brother Herman, who was a dentist, and there he studied dentistry. In 1902, he received a government diploma in Kazan as a dental healer.

Later, when writing about his youth, Trumpeldor referred to the persecution and antisemitism he faced in Russia due to his Jewish identity:

"Along with other Jews, I drank from the cup of suffering and humiliation since childhood because with contempt or hatred, they called me 'Zhid' or deprived me of rights given to other Russian citizens. In me, there is national pride and a high spirit."

Trumpeldor was influenced by the teachings of Herzl and the historic event of the First Zionist Congress (1897). At age 17, he established a Zionist circle in his city and served as its chairman. However, his activities ceased when he was drafted into the Russian army.

== Military career ==
In 1902, Trumpeldor was drafted into the army. As a Tolstoyan, he held anti-militaristic views but decided to enlist so that his abstention would not be perceived as Jewish cowardice. He was initially assigned to the 76th Infantry Regiment of the Kuban, based in the city of Tulchyn. There, he befriended David Belotserkovsky.

Early in his military service, Trumpeldor began developing his ideas about settling in Eretz Yisrael.

Trumpeldor volunteered for the 27th Siberian Infantry Regiment that was sent to Port Arthur—the main Russian naval base in East Asia. Soon after, the Russo-Japanese War broke out. From the early battles, Trumpeldor’s name became known as a hero distinguished by his composure and resilience. Following the Russian forces’ retreat to the fortress of Port Arthur, he was awarded the Saint George Cross, 4th degree, and the rank of Sergeant.

Trumpeldor volunteered for the regiment's Special Forces unit, tasked with the most dangerous missions. In this elite unit, he encountered antisemitism when one of the commanders declared that there were no cowards or traitors in the unit because there were no Jews among them. The proud Trumpeldor immediately declared his Jewish identity publicly.

On August 20, 1904, a shell shattered his left arm, and doctors had to amputate it above the elbow. Despite his severe injury, Trumpeldor remained motivated and optimistic about the future. His unique personality was evident in a powerful letter he wrote to his family:

"Again, I ask you not to feel sorrow for me; firstly, even if you do, it will not change anything, and secondly, many people have lost both their right and left hands, yet they still live. Moreover, I hope that even with my one right hand, with which I write this letter, I will succeed in life to a degree that even those with two hands would envy me."

After recovering, he requested to return to the front and said to his commanders:

"I have one hand left, but it is my right hand, and therefore I wish to share the life of my comrades as before. I ask His Excellency to grant me a sword and a pistol."

His bravery in battle and his rare request to return to the front earned him special recognition. He was promoted to the rank of Senior Sergeant and received another decoration—the Saint George Cross, 3rd degree. At a ceremonial parade held in his honor, he was appointed commander of the third company and gained the admiration of his soldiers.

=== In Japanese captivity ===
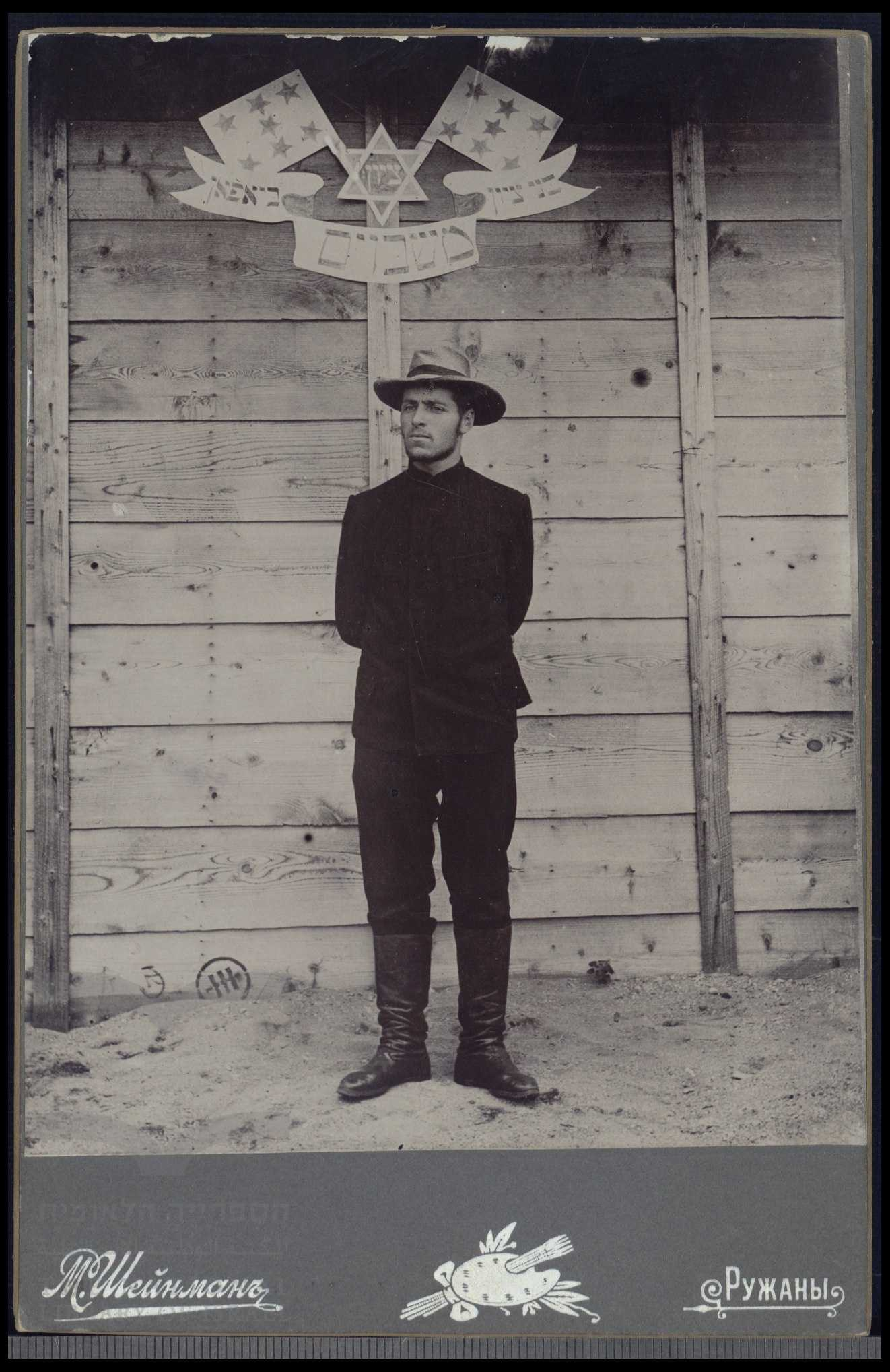
Joseph Trumpeldor in Japanese captivity. In the background is the emblem of the Zionist association he founded—"Bnei Zion Captives in Japan," with a Star of David and two flags of Herzl's Seven Stars.

On January 2, 1905, following Russia's defeat at the Battle of Port Arthur, Trumpeldor was captured and taken to a Prisoner of War camp in Takayama, Japan. The Russian prisoners in Japan received good conditions. They were divided into camps according to their religious affiliation, with 1,739 of the approximately 70,000 Russian prisoners being Jewish. Trumpeldor spent about a year in Japanese captivity, and thanks to his personality, he became the leader of the Jewish prisoners. In captivity, he worked tirelessly to promote his ideological and socio-national vision. Alongside organizing the needs of the prisoners in education, welfare, and tradition.

He established a Loan fund, workshops, schools, a library, a theater troupe, and even arranged for religious needs, requesting the Japanese to assist in baking matzah, acquiring a Torah scroll, and tallitot, and writing greeting cards for Rosh Hashanah.

An example of Trumpeldor’s educational activities can be found in a special letter written by a Jewish prisoner to his teacher Trumpeldor:

"As a token of the tireless work of the dear teacher Joseph ben Ze'ev Trumpeldor, I thank you for your diligent efforts on my behalf."

Being among Jewish prisoners in the camp stirred strong nationalistic feelings in Trumpeldor. Therefore, most of his activities focused on Zionism. He founded a Zionist association called "Bnei Zion Captives in Japan" (which included 120 members). He raised funds for Zionist causes, such as the Jewish National Fund, building a Hebrew school in Jaffa, a library in Jerusalem, and planting a forest in Herzl’s memory. In July 1905, he sent a letter of support to the Seventh Zionist Congress in Basel. Trumpeldor also helped establish a Zionist association within the small Jewish community in Japan. He published a Zionist weekly in Yiddish and Russian called "Der Yiddisher Leben" ('Jewish Life'), of which he was the editor and author of most articles.

In captivity, Trumpeldor began developing his social-national ideas regarding the establishment of cooperative settlements in Eretz Yisrael. To seek support for his plans, he wrote a letter from captivity to Menachem Ussishkin. He planned to immigrate to Israel with ten carefully selected individuals to establish a new settlement.

Trumpeldor was widely admired by prisoners, both Jewish and non-Jewish. Following the signing of the Treaty of Portsmouth, Trumpeldor was one of the first to be released from captivity. His friends reported that thousands came to bid him farewell at the POW camp, carrying him on their shoulders and cheering:

"Here is a true man! Look at him!!"

The Japanese captors respected Trumpeldor’s leadership and character, and his legacy remains appreciated to this day. In 2006, an exhibition was held in Takayashi about the Russo-Japanese War POW camp. A room in the exhibition was dedicated to Trumpeldor, showcasing photos and describing his Zionist activities until his death in the Battle of Tel Hai.

=== Zion Mule Corps ===
Trumpeldor was among the supporters and founders of the Zion Mule Corps. Lieutenant-colonel John Patterson was appointed as the commander of the corps, and Trumpeldor was appointed as his deputy, with the rank of captain. The corps was transferred to Gallipoli where it participated as an auxiliary force, supplying the ANZAC troops (forces from Australia and New Zealand). Trumpeldor performed heroic acts in Gallipoli and was even injured in the shoulder by a rifle bullet.

Trumpeldor was the driving force in the corps. The corps, which suffered from severe disciplinary issues, including attempts at desertion and low morale, barely held together due to his influence and concern for the members of the corps. Despite being praised by its officers for their performance, after the failed campaign the British high command refused to transfer the unit to another front. The corps, including Trumpeldor, was disbanded, and some of its members joined the subsequent Jewish battalions.

In Alexandria, upon his return from Gallipoli, Trumpeldor took French lessons from Fira (Esther) Rozov, a member of a wealthy citrus-growing family and one of the pioneers of Petach Tikva, who were also exiled to Egypt due to their foreign nationality. Fira, 22 years old and 13 years younger than Trumpeldor, quickly became his beloved and fiancée, and he shared all his secrets and emotions with her for several years, writing her numerous letters during the war that described his experiences.

In October 1916, after abandoning his efforts to rebuild the corps, Trumpeldor traveled to London to assist Ze'ev Jabotinsky in establishing a Jewish fighting unit. Others involved in these efforts included David Ben-Gurion, Yitzhak Ben-Zvi, and Pinhas Rutenberg. Jabotinsky hoped that British Jews would enlist en masse for a Jewish unit in the army and believed that Trumpeldor, whose reputation as a hero preceded him, could help him recruit volunteers. However, the recruitment effort failed miserably. Trumpeldor and Jabotinsky encountered severe and even violent hostility from the Jewish community, which refused to enlist. Despite the difficulties, Trumpeldor continued to advocate for the idea of the unit. He met with Chaim Weizmann, as well as with prominent opponents of the idea, such as Rabbi Joseph Hertz, the Chief Rabbi of the United Kingdom, Ahad Ha'am, and Nahum Sokolow, who viewed the establishment of a Jewish military unit as inappropriate and "un-Jewish."

In December 1916, 120 men from the remnants of the Zion Mule Corps arrived in London, whom Trumpeldor managed to persuade to enlist in the British army. These men ultimately formed the nucleus of the Jewish Legion, which Jabotinsky, with Trumpeldor's active assistance, succeeded in establishing with great effort and after numerous persuasion attempts in 1917. Trumpeldor, unable to join the unit due to his amputated arm and foreign nationality, went to Russia following the February Revolution.

== Zionist activism ==
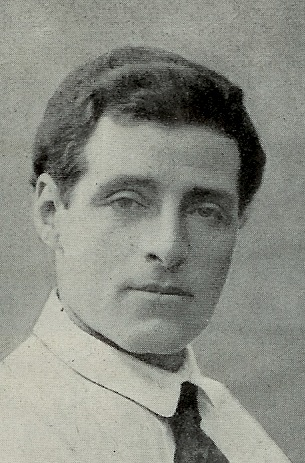
Joseph Trumpeldor in 1917

In June 1917, Trumpeldor returned to Russia to work there on behalf of Zionism and the Land of Israel. His ambition this time was to recruit a Jewish force of one hundred thousand men to be sent to the front in the Caucasus or Persia and eventually reach the Land of Israel. The Russian Provisional Government viewed Trumpeldor’s grand plan favorably, but the Jewish and Zionist establishment in Russia was hesitant (at that time, the Russian army was suffering defeats on all fronts, and the likelihood of death at the front was high). In light of the growing danger of a Bolshevik uprising and the expected pogroms against Jews that might follow, Trumpeldor turned his efforts to organizing Jewish self-defense, as a first and urgent task. In December 1917, he received permission from the Bolshevik government to establish a Jewish unit of 1,000 men in Petrograd. However, the idea met resistance among the Jews, who were hesitant to take a stand in the developing Russian Civil War between the Bolsheviks and the Whites. Only about 20 men enlisted in the unit, and it was disbanded after about two months.

Trumpeldor continued his activities in organizing Jewish self-defense units in Southern Russia under the Yevsektsiya, which was anti-Zionist. However, these efforts were not successful. The Jewish self-defense units provoked the anger of the Cossack and White insurgents, and only the Red Army and the German Imperial Army, which controlled large parts of Russia, provided assistance to the Jews.

=== HeHalutz organization ===
Following the February Revolution, there was a revival and awakening in the Zionist movement in Russia. The number of "Shekel Payers" exceeded 140,000, and tens of thousands of young people aspired to immigrate to the Land of Israel. The global "HeHalutz" organization mobilized young people interested in immigrating to Israel and becoming pioneers. At the beginning of 1918, Trumpeldor became actively involved in the movement. He worked intensively on drafting practical plans for establishing communes (essentially kibbutzim) in the Land of Israel, forming a pioneering military organization, a labor union, and facilitating immigration. The movement adopted many of Trumpeldor’s ideas and elected him as the movement's chairman at its first conference.

Trumpeldor organized "training" in Petrograd for agricultural workers, set up a loan fund, a club, and a shared residence. He then went to the Crimea and organized HeHalutz activities there as well. In August 1919, he set out once again for the Land of Israel.

=== Aliyah ===
On his way to the Land of Israel, Trumpeldor stopped in Constantinople. There, as usual, he helped the pioneers waiting for their turn to immigrate by providing them with employment and organizing various welfare activities. He met the Russian deserter, Captain Aryeh Bayevsky, and the two became friends. In late October 1919, Trumpeldor returned to Israel. A few months later, in March 1920, Bayevsky arrived at Jaffa Port and joined the group of pioneers, who referred him to the Water Committee. In Israel, his fiancée, Fira Rozov, awaited him, but upon his arrival, their relationship ended, likely due to a connection Trumpeldor formed in Crimea with another young woman, Emma (Nechama) Tsipkin.

Jabotinsky greeted Trumpeldor with enthusiasm. It was a tumultuous period in the country. The Zionist Commission had failed in its attempts to absorb the demobilized Jewish Legion members and to promote settlement. The Zionist Organization not only failed to encourage mass immigration but was also unable to absorb the small quota of immigrants allocated by the British authorities. This was the state of affairs when Trumpeldor returned to the Land of Israel. He assisted in preparations for the arrival of "HeHalutz" members from Russia and Turkey. He also contributed to the planning of the establishment of a Hebrew Navy in the Land of Israel and the purchase of a Halutz Ship for training the movement’s pioneers from the Caucasus in Seafaring and to engage in Labor Conquest at Sea. He also participated in a plan for establishing fishing villages along the coast with pioneers trained by Subbotniks brought from the Astrakhan region in the Caucasus. He viewed with distaste the party disputes between Ahdut HaAvoda and Hapoel Hatzair, writing:

"When our comrades arrive here, they should not involve themselves in the ongoing war between Achdut HaAvoda and HaPoel HaTzair. This conflict has engulfed almost all the workers and is severely damaging our general cause... It would be best if our new comrades who come to the land remained outside this party conflict."

Trumpeldor aspired to unite all workers under one party so that they could fight together for workers' rights in the Land of Israel. He issued a "call" on the matter, which gained significant attention but did not succeed in convincing HaPoel HaTzair to unite with Achdut HaAvoda. However, under the influence of his call, after his death, in Hanukkah 1920, the conference that established the General Federation of Workers in the Land of Israel was held.

He called for an increase in Aliyah:

"Every moment is precious. Every person entering the country is saved from certain death or a life of Marranos. Any delay is a sin on our part."

In the midst of his struggle for cooperation among the workers' parties, Israel Shochat, one of the leaders of the Hashomer organization, asked Trumpeldor to go to the Upper Galilee and check the situation there.

== Events at Tel Hai ==
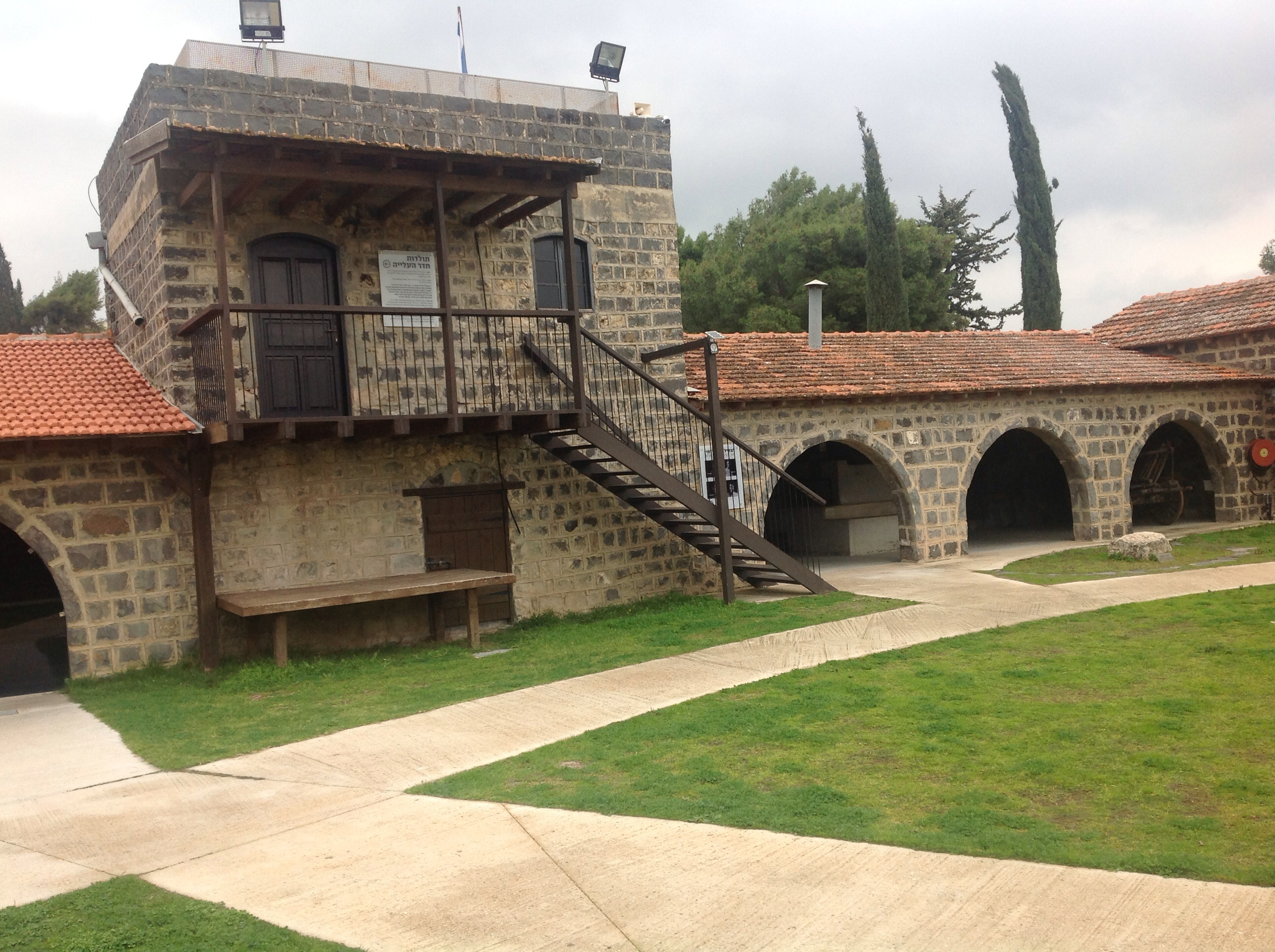
Courtyard of Tel Hai

In 1916, a secret agreement was signed between the United Kingdom and France regarding the division of the Ottoman Empire after the end of World War I. This agreement, known as the Sykes-Picot Agreement, included the northern Galilee (including Galilee Panhandle) in France’s sphere of influence. The agreement was renewed in September 1919, as an agreement signed between Lloyd George, the prime minister of the United Kingdom, and Georges Clemenceau, the prime minister of France. According to this agreement, the British withdrew from areas they had captured north of a line drawn between Rosh HaNikra and Buazia near Lake Hula (just north of today's Ayelet HaShahar).

France did not establish its rule in the region and did not send sufficient military forces, initially holding only the coastal area near Sidon. The local Arabs took advantage of the situation to rebel against French rule and even harassed the Christian villages in the area, which France had promised to protect. Numerous Bedouin armed groups operated in the region, whose activities were tolerated by the British. Four Jewish settlements in the French-controlled area were caught up in these events: the Metula colony, the groups Tel Hai and Kfar Giladi, and the founding group of the Hamara settlement. The leadership of the Yishuv debated whether to evacuate these settlements and relocate their residents to British Mandate territory or to continue holding the land. Ultimately, no decision was made, and the settlements remained in the French-controlled area.

Initially, the Arabs did not harm the Jewish settlements, but the situation later deteriorated. On November 15, 1919, Bedouins disguised as French gendarmes entered Kfar Giladi, confiscated weapons, and stole money and property. On December 12, they attacked Tel Hai, killing Shneur Shposhnik, a resident of Petach Tikva. On December 17, another attack occurred, during which the defenders of Tel Hai acknowledged their military inferiority against the rebels and awaited reinforcements. Small reinforcements of a few people and rifles arrived.

David Ben-Gurion asked Trumpeldor to organize the defense of the settlements and report on the situation. Trumpeldor arrived at Tel Hai at the end of December 1919. Bedouin attacks continued. In one incident, Trumpeldor and his men were captured, robbed, and stripped of their clothes. Following the attacks, the Hamara settlement was abandoned and was never re-established. On January 4, 1920, Bedouins attacked Hamara, where a French force was present at the time; the force retreated to Metula, and the Bedouins set Hamara on fire.

Following the French withdrawal, the defenders of Tel Hai, led by Trumpeldor, grew increasingly anxious. Their frustration grew due to the lack of support they received from the weakened Yishuv institutions and the nascent Haganah committee. On January 8, the defenders of the Galilee issued a proclamation that read, among other things:

"Proclamation to the youth of the land: We have stood our ground for some time and have decided to continue defending the Upper Galilee until the very last moment... We will resist the enemy surrounding us and will not leave until our final breath... We call upon you, the youth of the land, whose sense of responsibility and offense stirs you, to come to our aid..."

Later that month, a large French force arrived in Metula; its Jewish residents left, and the force completely destroyed and looted the colony. In early February, the French withdrew from Metula, and the situation in the area worsened.

On February 9, 1920, Trumpeldor wrote to the Haganah Committee from Ayelet HaShahar, stating that the Arab leaders had decided "to destroy and annihilate the Jewish settlement in the Upper Galilee." Trumpeldor sent a request to the Yishuv leadership for reinforcements and urgently needed supplies:

"We demand again: send assistance to Tel Hai and Kfar Giladi! Their situation is dire..."

The Workers' Committee in Jaffa convened a meeting attended by David Ben-Gurion, A.Z.R., Avraham Herzfeld, and Shmuel HaPater, and it was decided to reinforce the northern defenders, but the number of people sent was small.

On February 23, 1920, the provisional Haganah committee convened to discuss the defense of the Upper Galilee. Representatives of the workers' parties, led by Berl Katznelson, supported reinforcing the defenders, while the representatives of the "civilians" hesitated, fearing conflict with the Arabs. Ze'ev Jabotinsky argued that it was impractical to defend the settlements and suggested relocating all those in the French-controlled area to British territory. The assembly decided to continue defending the settlements and to establish a committee to organize the defense and rescue the points. However, by the time the committee reached Ayelet HaShahar, it was already too late.

=== Injury and death ===
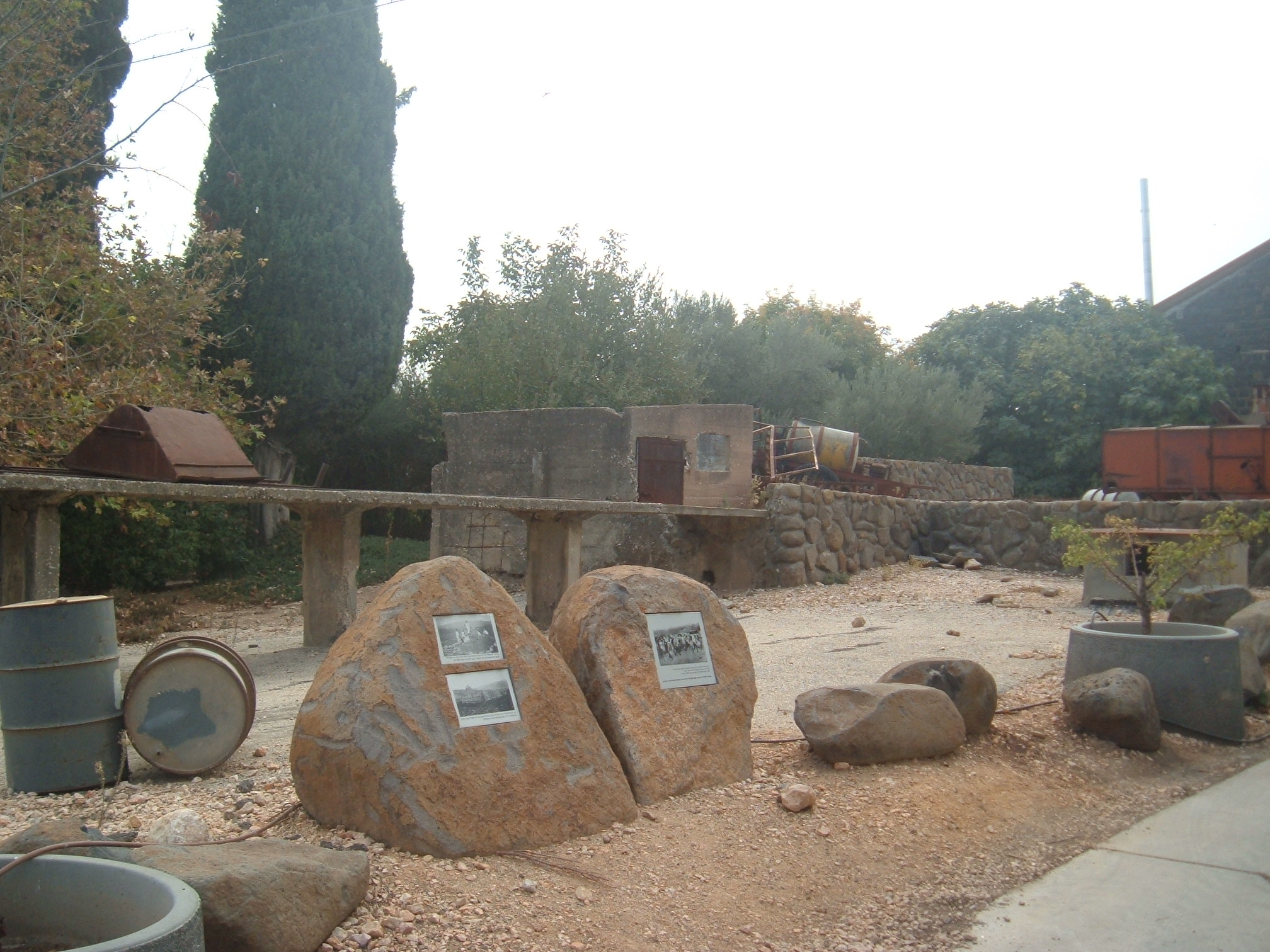
Memorial stones at the site of Trumpeldor and his comrades' temporary grave between Tel Hai and Kfar Giladi

On 11 Adar, 5680, March 1, 1920, Arabs arrived at Tel Hai and requested entry to check if there were any French soldiers in the settlement. They were allowed entry, but then the Arabs decided to confiscate the weapons of the Tel Hai residents. When they attempted to forcibly take the weapon of Deborah Drukler, Trumpeldor ordered the defenders to open fire on the attackers. A gunfight ensued, and Trumpeldor was severely wounded in his abdomen. Those around him hesitated to tend to his wounds, as they were untrained in medical care. He ordered water, washed his hand, pushed his intestines back into his abdomen, and was bandaged. In the meantime, the attackers temporarily retreated, and Trumpeldor handed command over to Pinchas Schneerson.

The battle continued as some of the Arabs fortified themselves in the attic of Tel Hai. The defenders of Tel Hai managed to throw hand grenades and repel the attackers. Both sides suffered casualties, and in the middle of the battle, a truce was declared, allowing the Arabs to evacuate their dead and wounded. However, due to heavy losses and dwindling ammunition, a decision was made to abandon Tel Hai and retreat. The evacuation with the wounded and the bodies of the dead from the courtyard of Tel Hai took place on a stormy, rainy night, and the path was filled with mud. The decision was made to retreat from Tel Hai and regroup only at Kfar Giladi and Metula.

During the long battle, Trumpeldor, who was injured, was asked several times about his condition. The message in his responses was:

If I must die, I do so for a noble cause – defending the settlements, defending my fellow defenders, and defending the Land of Israel.

These words and the important message they carried were highlighted in numerous testimonies published immediately after the battle. For example, in a letter written that same night, Avraham Herzfeld told his colleagues at the Agricultural Center that Trumpeldor said to him: "It's nothing; it's worth dying for the Land of Israel." Dr. Gary, who treated him, also testified that Trumpeldor replied: "It’s nothing; it’s worth dying for the country." Another wounded individual present next to Trumpeldor at that time recounted that "when Dr. Gary asked about his condition, he said, 'It is good to die for our country.'"

It is possible that this statement originated from a well-known Latin proverb: "It is sweet and fitting to die for one's country."

This statement by Trumpeldor became a symbol of supreme sacrifice and heroism for the people and the land. It became a national value on which many generations were raised. As Prime Minister Yitzhak Rabin said on Tel Hai Day:

"The roaring lion is silent – but his story has been spreading for decades from one end of the country to the other. Every child in Israel, for generations, knows the story of Joseph Trumpeldor, the story of his fallen comrades, the story of Tel Hai's heroism. There have been greater acts of heroism in the history of the Land of Israel; thousands have been killed, but no story like Tel Hai's illustrates our connection to the land, pioneering, settlement, and security. The story of Tel Hai is the essence of our story here, on this land. For seventy-five years, we have walked with this story, with Joseph Trumpeldor's last words: 'It is good to die for our country.' We have educated generations of fighters on these words."

The writer Yosef Haim Brenner wrote in response to the events of Tel Hai:

Trumpeldor said before his death, "It is good to die for our country" – Blessed is he who dies with this awareness and Tel Hai at his head.

The Haredi-Zionist thinker Rabbi Yissachar Shlomo Teichtal also praised the pioneers building the land in his book Em HaBanim Semeicha, stating:

"As is well known, many have died for the land, as we have heard during the Arab riots, and some of the Jews who stood against them and died by their hands said before their souls departed these words: 'It is good to die for our country.'"

There is also a claim that Trumpeldor's original words were: "It is good to die for the land," but those who heard him slightly altered the phrasing to more proper Hebrew.

By the time the group reached Kfar Giladi, Trumpeldor was no longer alive. The people of Kfar Giladi, fearing that the Arab and Bedouin attack would continue, did not allow the defenders of Tel Hai to sleep under their roof. They buried the fighters in a temporary mass grave. Years later, the remains were transferred to the cemetery in Kfar Giladi.

The defenders of Kfar Giladi and Metula continued to stand against their enemies, and on the morning of 13 Adar 5680 (March 3, 1920), they were forced to abandon these points as well after seeing a mass of riders and foot soldiers preparing to attack them.

The Galilee Panhandle remained empty of Jews for several months. In July 1920, the French expelled Faisal from Damascus, and in December 1920, France and Britain signed an agreement transferring the Galilee Panhandle to British control. Even before that, the farmers returned to Metula, and members of Hashomer and the Labor Battalion returned to Kfar Giladi and later to Tel Hai.

== Commemoration ==
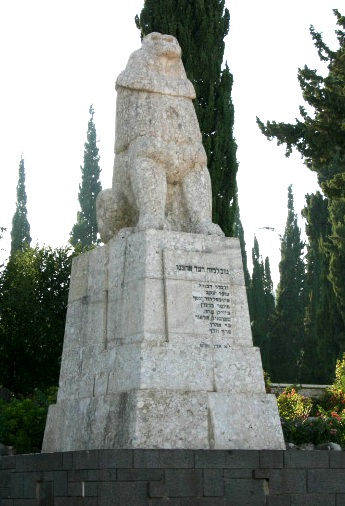
The Roaring Lion statue at the cemetery in Kfar Giladi

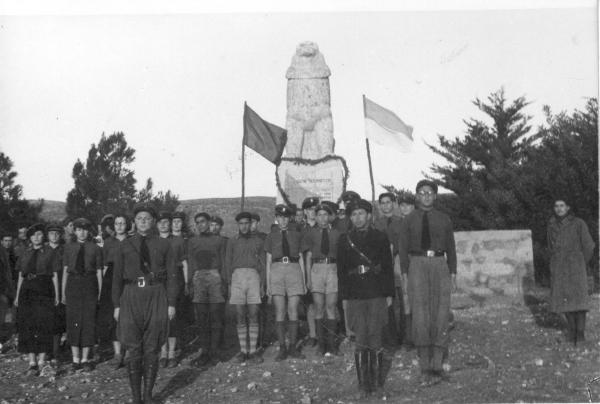
Members of the Betar youth movement next to the Roaring Lion statue

In memory of Trumpeldor and his comrades, eulogies were delivered from both sides of the political spectrum. The most well-known were "Tel Hai" by Ze'ev Jabotinsky, the founder of Revisionist Zionism, eight days after the battle, and "Yizkor Am Yisrael" by Berl Katznelson, one of the leaders of Socialist Zionism.

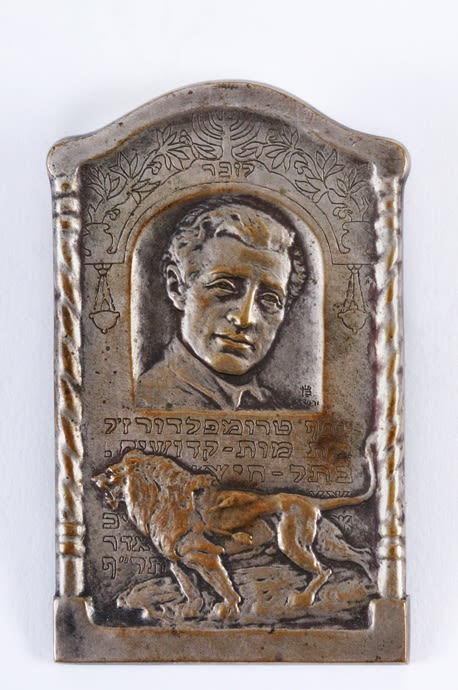
A relief in memory of Joseph Trumpeldor by Boris Schatz, 1920s

The story of Trumpeldor's heroism and death became a foundational story on which generations were educated. His death defending Tel Hai immediately became a symbol of Jewish resistance, in contrast to being slaughtered in pogroms without resistance. Leaders such as Berl Katznelson, Ze'ev Jabotinsky, Yosef Haim Brenner, and many others eulogized him and the others who fell at Tel Hai. One of Trumpeldor's dreams for cooperation among the workers' parties was realized in his memory on December 9, 1920, with the founding of the Histadrut.

- Trumpeldor's trainees in the "HeHalutz" movement established a group of pioneers and settlers in his name, called the Labor and Defense Battalion in Memory of Joseph Trumpeldor, or simply the Labor Battalion. The battalion was founded by eighty-eight members at a memorial on the six-month anniversary of his death on 11 Elul 5680, August 25, 1920, at a camp near Hamat Tiberias.
- The kibbutz Tel Yosef, established by members of the Labor Battalion, was named after Trumpeldor. The kibbutz houses the "Trumpeldor House" museum, which once contained Trumpeldor's prosthetic hand, transferred to the Zionist Archives on the 100th anniversary of his death.
- Streets in Jerusalem and Tel Aviv (which, due to its location, also includes the cemetery known as Trumpeldor Cemetery), two streets in Haifa (Joseph the One-Armed in Hadar HaCarmel and Trumpeldor Boulevard in Neve Sha'anan) as well as streets and schools in many towns across Israel bear his name. A neighborhood in Tel Aviv and one in Nahariya are also named after Trumpeldor.
- Ze'ev Jabotinsky, leader of the Revisionist movement and Trumpeldor’s close friend, founded the youth movement named after him – Betar: Alliance of Joseph Trumpeldor. Jabotinsky admired Trumpeldor and described their shared path. To maintain the acronym, Beitar members continue to spell the name 'Trumpeldor' with a 'Tet.' On the story of Tel Hai, Jabotinsky wrote the Song of the Prisoners of Acre.
- Kiryat Shmona, near the site of Trumpeldor's and his seven comrades' deaths and burials at Tel Hai, is named after them. Initially, it was called Kiryat Yosef, after Trumpeldor.

Trumpeldor's heroism is reflected in Berl Katznelson’s introduction to the book "Events of 1936," written by Bracha Habas, where he compared the settlers' heroism in facing Arab terror during 1936–1939 to the heroism of the defenders of Tel Hai:

"The generation of the siege and the fortress, which absorbed arrows and did not retreat, which did not abandon any point and did not allow any settlement to be evacuated... This generation can say to Joseph Trumpeldor and Aharon Sher, the men of Tel Hai: We did not shame you. You did not leave empty-handed."

On the centennial of Trumpeldor's birth, Professor Yigal Ilam wrote:

"If I were asked to name one person, one true hero, head and shoulders above the rest, in our entire Zionist and settlement history, I would not hesitate: Trumpeldor, this is the man. Our mythology did not err in its identification. It chose the right man."

Many songs and stories have been written about Trumpeldor.

In Abraham Broides' song 'In the Galilee,' he wrote:

There was once an ancient hero

Who shattered rocks and moved boulders.

In the path of destruction within caves He roared his voice, igniting lights.

With a song of life, he went to battle Against a large and numerous crowd.

'It is good to die on guard For our land!' he said.

There was once a hero, a riddle,

With a single arm.

The composer Emanuel Amiran wrote a piece in his honor and memory titled Joseph the Galilean, which begins with the words:

In the Galilee, Joseph plowed, and the song never left his lips.

In the spring of 1920, Abba Schneller (later Abba Hushi) read the words of a song inspired by the heroic stand of Joseph Trumpeldor and his comrades in the courtyard of Tel Hai for the first time at a conference of "Hashomer Hatzair" in Lviv:

In the Galilee, in Tel Hai,

Trumpeldor fell. For our people, for our land Hero Joseph fell.

Through mountains, through hills He ran to save the name of Tel Hai To say, to the brothers there: "Follow me."

"Everywhere and at every moment Remember me, For I fought and also fell For my homeland.

All day I plowed And at night, a rifle In my hand I held

Until the very last moment.

Joseph Trumpeldor is buried in the cemetery of Kfar Giladi, near the graves of the Hashomer members, in a mass grave, along with the seven other fighters who were killed at Tel Hai. Above their grave stands the statue of the "Roaring Lion," with the inscription "It is good to die for our country." Every year on 11 Adar, school students and members of youth movements visit the grave to commemorate the battle and what it symbolizes in a state ceremony attended by a representative of the Government of Israel. The life and heroism of Captain Joseph Trumpeldor are detailed on the Yizkor website – the memorial site for the fallen of Israel's wars, Ministry of Defense.

== Writings ==
- From the Life of Joseph Trumpeldor: A Collection of Letters and Notes, Jaffa: Histadrut, 1922:
  - 2nd Edition, expanded; edited by Menahem Poznanski, Tel Aviv: Am Oved, 1945
- Abraham Yaari, Memoirs of the Land of Israel – Volume 2:
  - Chapter 98, Joseph Trumpeldor, In the Mule Drivers Battalion, 1915, pp. 1042–1047 – Negotiations with the British Command in Egypt, recruitment to the battalion, the journey to the front, at Gallipoli
  - Chapter 107, Joseph Trumpeldor, The Defense of Upper Galilee Settlements, 1920, pp. 1133–1156

== See also ==
- Trumpeldor Cemetery, Tel Aviv
- Killing of Moshe Barsky

== Sources ==
- The personal papers of Joseph Trumpeldor are kept at the Central Zionist Archives in Jerusalem. The notation of the record group is A42.
