= Killing of Moshe Barsky =

1913 Bedouin killing of a Zionist in Palestine

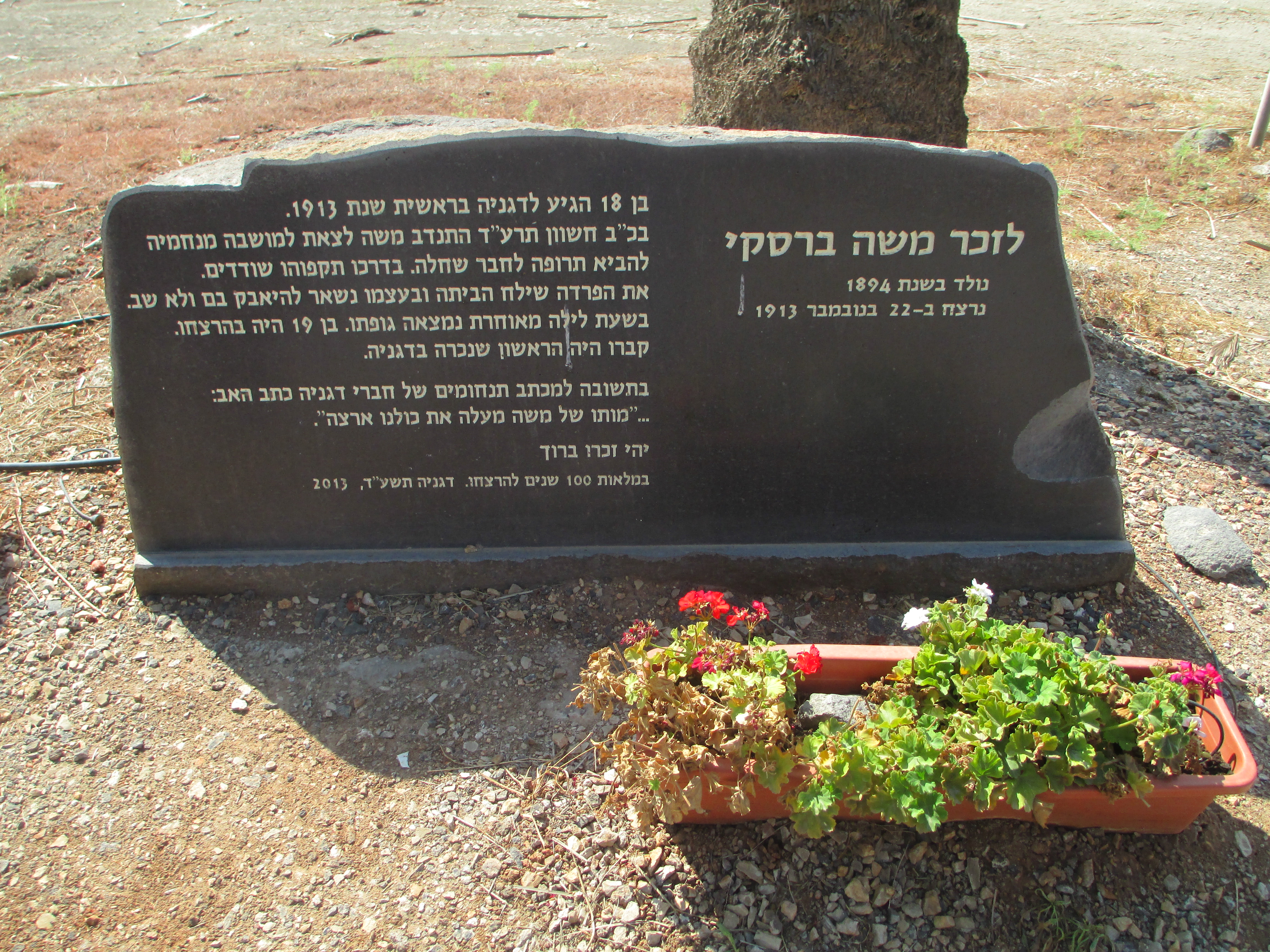
Memorial erected at Degania Alef on the centennial of Barsky's death

Moshe Barsky (1895 – 22 November 1913) was the first member of a Zionist kibbutz to be killed by a Bedouin.

Barsky was born in 1895 in Skvyra, Kiev Governorate, Russian Empire. He immigrated to Ottoman Palestine along with his sister in 1912. Barsky was a member of Degania Alef, the first kibbutz established by Jewish Zionist settlers. It was founded in 1910. He was 18 years old when he was killed with signs indicating that the murder was likely committed as an act of revenge.

Following his death, Barsky quickly became a Zionist symbol, and multiple myths surrounded his life and personality. Moshe Dayan, a well-known Israeli politician and notable public figure who was named after Barsky, pointed to his death as a reason to move forward with establishing a Jewish state. Scholars and historians have recognized Barsky's death as a significant part of pre-Israeli Zionist ethos and myths.

== Murder ==
Barsky was alone when he was shot by Bedouin raiders.

Moshe Dayan, whose parents were members of the kibbutz, was named after Barsky. Barsky had gone on a mule to obtain medicine from Menahemia for his friend and fellow kibbutz member, Shmuel Dayan. When the mule returned without him, a search was undertaken and his body was discovered.

According to the memoir of a fellow kibbutznik, "It wasn't until late that night that we found him, lying with a stick and a pair of shoes on his head: this was a sign of vengeance, it meant that in the fighting he had killed or wounded someone."

== Aftermath ==
Barsky's father, a Zionist in Kyiv (then in Tsarist Russia), wrote a letter to the kibbutz in which he urged, "that your spirit will not flag and that you will not retreat, God forbid!" But rather, "that the memory of my late son will bestow upon you strength and courage to withstand all the difficulties in this Holy endeavor until we realize our great ideal, for which my son has sacrificed his life and soul." The letter was the focus of a 1914 speech by Chaim Weizmann, urging European Zionists – shaken by the murder – not to abandon hope of building a Jewish homeland in Palestine.

Shortly after Barsky's death, his brother immigrated to Palestine to join Dagania Aleph.

== As a symbol ==
Literary scholar Rachel Havrelock understands the memorialization of Barsky in the years shortly after his death as part of a Zionist narrative "in which peril lurks to the unknown east, and the Jordan serves as a line between danger and safety", and his death – he was understood as having killed one of his attackers – of "the image of the Jew in Bedouin eyes as soft and easily killed."

== See also ==
- Joseph Trumpeldor
