= Suriyya al-Janubiyya (newspaper) =

- Publisher: Muhammad Hasan al-Budayri
- Editor: Aref al-Aref
- Founded: 1918
- Ceased publication: 1922
- Political alignment: Pan-Arabism, pan-Syrianism, Palestinian nationalism
- Language: Arabic

Suriyya al-Janubiyya (Arabic: سوريا الجنوبية, 'Southern Syria') was the name of a newspaper published in Jerusalem beginning in 1918 by the lawyer Muhammad Hasan al-Budayri, and edited by Aref al-Aref, with contributions from, amongst others, Amin al-Husseini.

At the time, the term "Southern Syria" referred to a political position which implied support for the Greater Syria nationalism associated with the kingdom promised to the Hashemites of the Hejaz by the British during World War I. After the war, the Hashemite prince Faisal attempted to establish such a Pan-Syrian or pan-Mashriq state (i.e. a united kingdom that would comprise all of modern Syria, as well as Mount Lebanon and Palestine, including Transjordan, so that Palestine would be the province of "Southern Syria"). This kingdom was to be united with the other Hashemite domains in Hejaz and Iraq, thus contributing in large measure towards the fulfillment of Pan-Arabist ambitions. However, he was stymied by conflicting promises made by the British to different parties (see Sykes–Picot Agreement, Balfour Declaration and McMahon–Hussein Correspondence), leading to the Franco-Syrian War, which destroyed the Arab Kingdom of Syria in 1920.

The newspaper Suriyya al-Janubiyya espoused this Pan-Syria idea alongside Pan-Arabist and Palestinian nationalist political positions. These positions were not contradictory at the time and, in fact, were mutually supportive. With the disappearance of Faisal's Syrian kingdom, the idea of Pan-Syrianism lost support, and the newspaper focused on Palestinian nationalism and opposition to British rule and Zionist immigration, prior to the suppression of the paper by the British authorities in April during the 1920 Nebi Musa riots. However, it later resumed publication and existed until 1922.
