= Philip Mattar =

Palestinian American historian (born 1944)

Philip Mattar (Arabic: فيليب مطر; born 1944) is a Palestinian American historian. Born in Haifa, he received his Ph.D. from Columbia University in Middle Eastern history and has taught history at Yale University, Georgetown University and the City College of New York. Mattar was a Fulbright scholar, a Fellow at The Woodrow Wilson Center (September 2001 - August 2002), and a Senior Fellow at the United States Institute of Peace (October 2002 - July 2003). He is the President of the Palestinian American Research Center in Washington D.C. whose mission is "To improve scholarship about Palestinian affairs, expand the pool of experts knowledgeable about the Palestinians, and strengthen linkages among Palestinian, American, and foreign research institutions and scholars." He also served as executive director of the Institute for Palestine Studies from 1984 to 2001.

Mattar's 1988 book, The Mufti of Jerusalem: Al-Hajj Amin Al-Husayni and the Palestinian National Movement, was "the first full-length biography" of Haj Amin al-Husseini. He was the editor of the "Encyclopedia of the Palestinians", published by Facts on File in 2000. Mattar has also published in Foreign Policy, Middle East Journal and Middle Eastern Studies and was one of the experts featured on National Public Radio's seven-part series, The Mideast: A Century of Conflict, in 2002.

== Major works ==
- Author. The Mufti of Jerusalem: Al-Hajj Amin Al-Husayni and the Palestinian National Movement. Columbia University Press. 1988, 1992.
- Co-editor. Encyclopedia of the modern Middle East. Macmillan Reference USA. 1996.
- Editor. Encyclopedia of the Palestinians. Facts on File. 2000, 2005.
- Co-editor. Encyclopedia of the modern Middle East and North Africa. Thomson Gale/Macmillan Reference USA. 2004.
