= Ma'ayan Harod National Park =

Israeli public park

Coordinates: 32°32′54″N 35°21′04″E

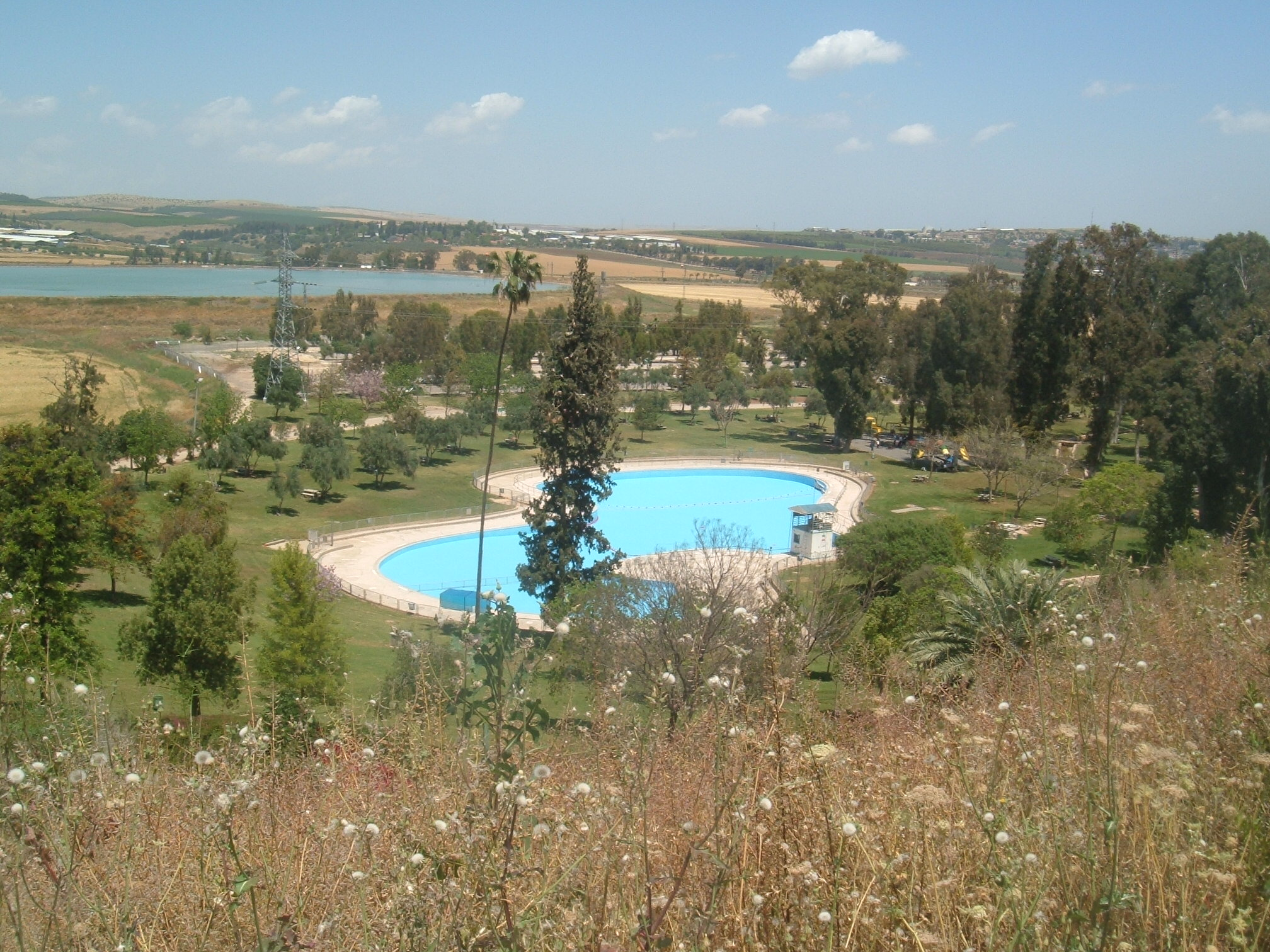
Swimming pool at the public park

Ma'ayan Harod National Park is a public park in Israel administered by the Israel Nature and Parks Authority that contains the spring known as Ma'ayan Harod or Ain Jalut that now feeds a recreational swimming pool, as well as the house and tomb of Yehoshua Hankin.

The house of Hankin has become a museum showing historical artifacts and life-size mannequins of the couple Hankin. Next to the museum is a war memorial for residents of the valley who died in Israel's wars.

The park has been described as "well maintained", but visitors to the site "have absolutely no way of knowing that one of the climactic battles of the Middle Ages was fought in it" (referring to the Battle of Ain Jalut).

== Features ==
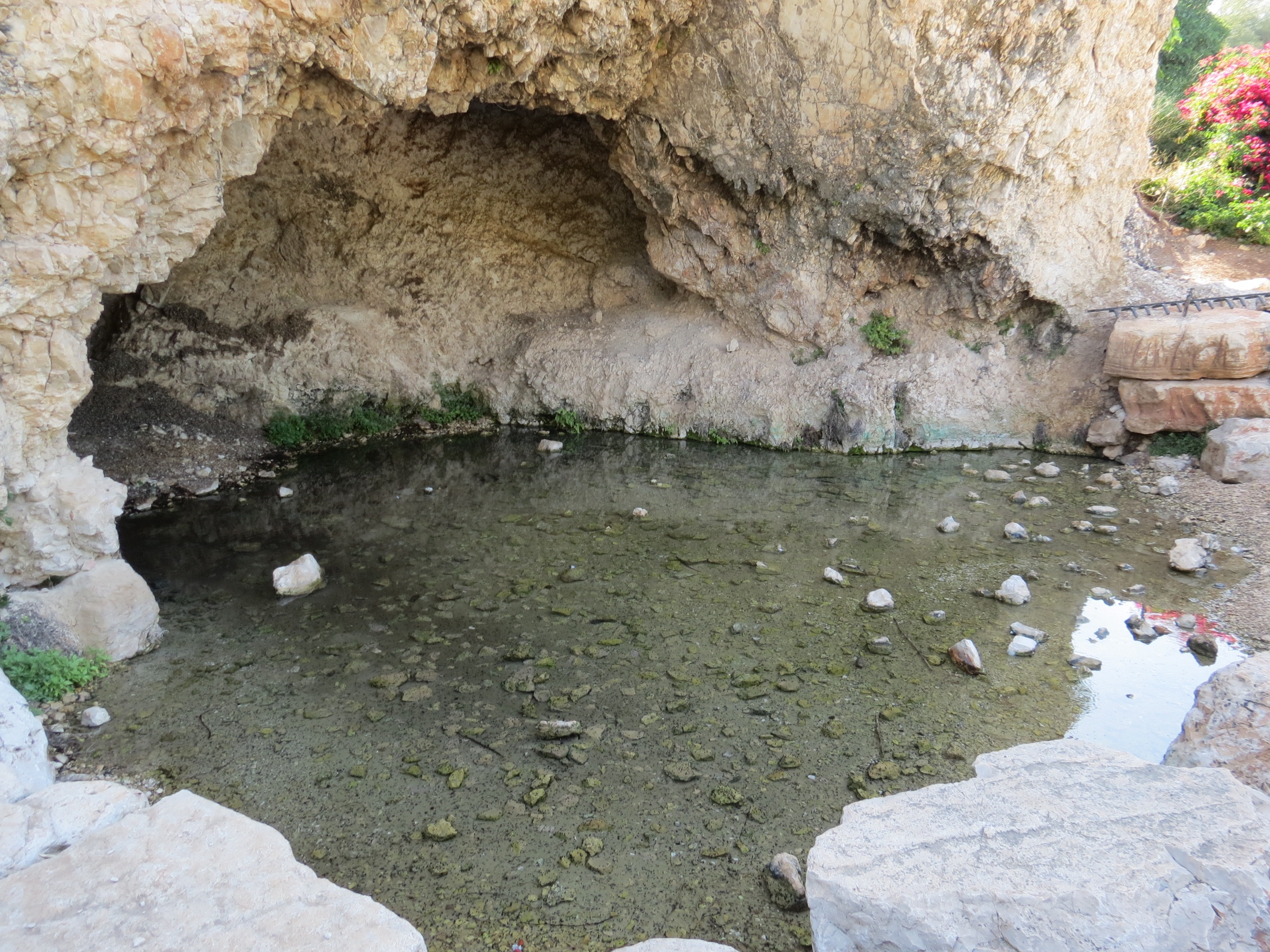
The cave from which the spring water emerges

=== Natural spring ===
The all-year-round spring known as Ma'ayan Harod or Ain Jalut is used to feed a recreational swimming pool. The source of the spring as well as other springs in the Beit She'an Valley to the east, comes from fresh rainwater that percolate into the limestone hills of Samaria and collect in an underground water reservoir beneath the areas of the Palestinian cities of Nablus and Jenin. The water emerges from the hills as they incline north towards the valleys. At this valley the waters emerge from a natural cave known colloquially as "Gideon's Cave".

=== House and tomb of the Hankins ===
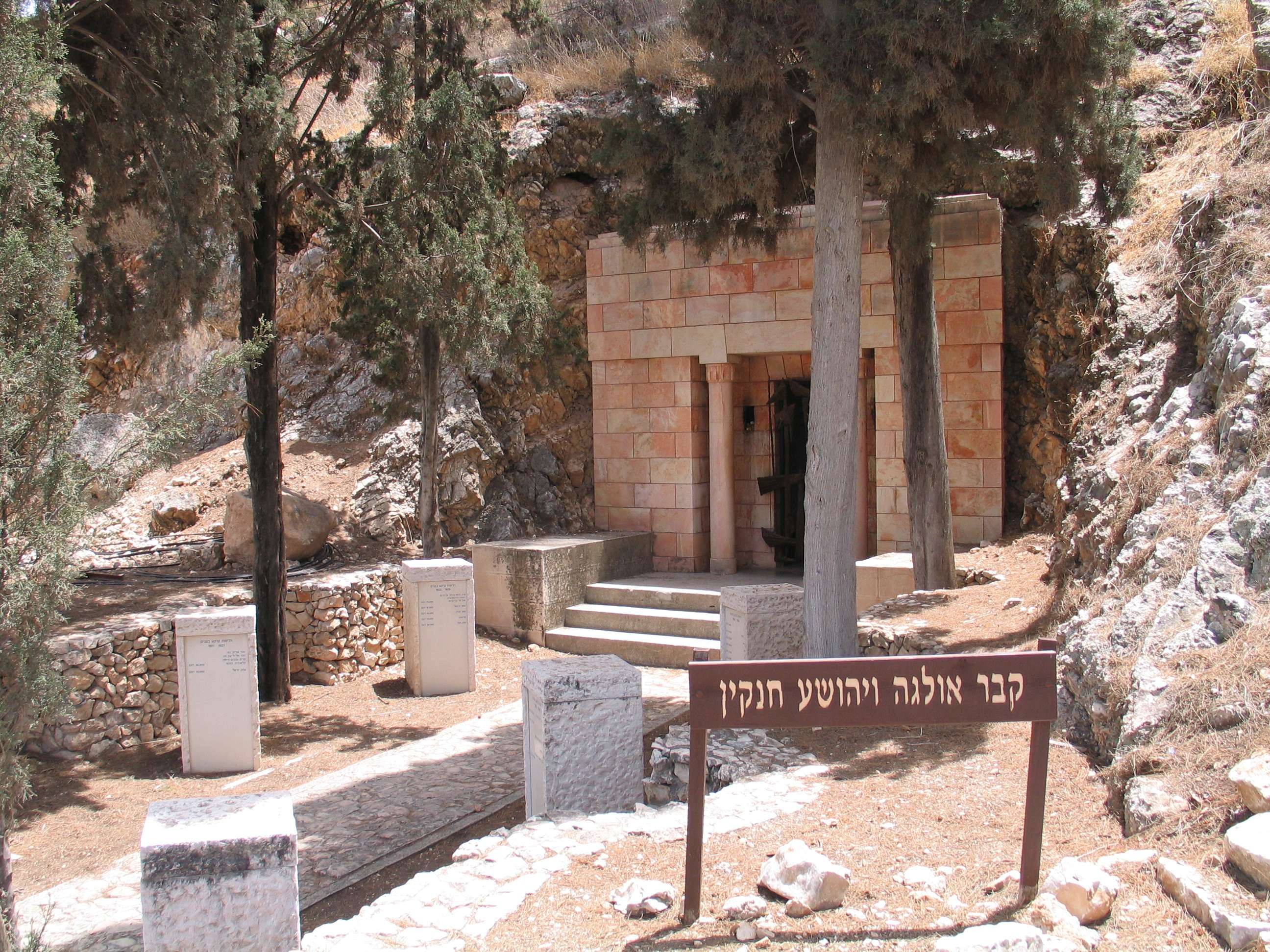
The tomb of the Hankins

The national park also contains the house and tomb of the Zionist activist and settler Yehoshua Hankin, who founded the kibbutz of Ein Harod and built a home in the valley with his wife Olga Hankin near the spring. Their house was planned as a bauhaus and construction began in the 1930s just above the spring. Pioneers of Beit HaShita who camped at the spring helped the construction. When his wife got sick and died in 1942, Hankin buried her next to the house in a tomb inspired by the ancient Roman-Jewish tombs in Beit She'arim (Roman-era Jewish village). Hankin died in 1945 and was buried next to his wife. The tomb's entrance was designed by Israeli artists David Palombo, who designed the gates of the Knesset. For some years the tomb was a pilgrimage site for women hoping to get pregnant.
