= Mishkan Museum of Art =

Israeli art museum

Coordinates: 32.561°N 35.3931°E

- המשכן לאמנות על שם חיים אתר
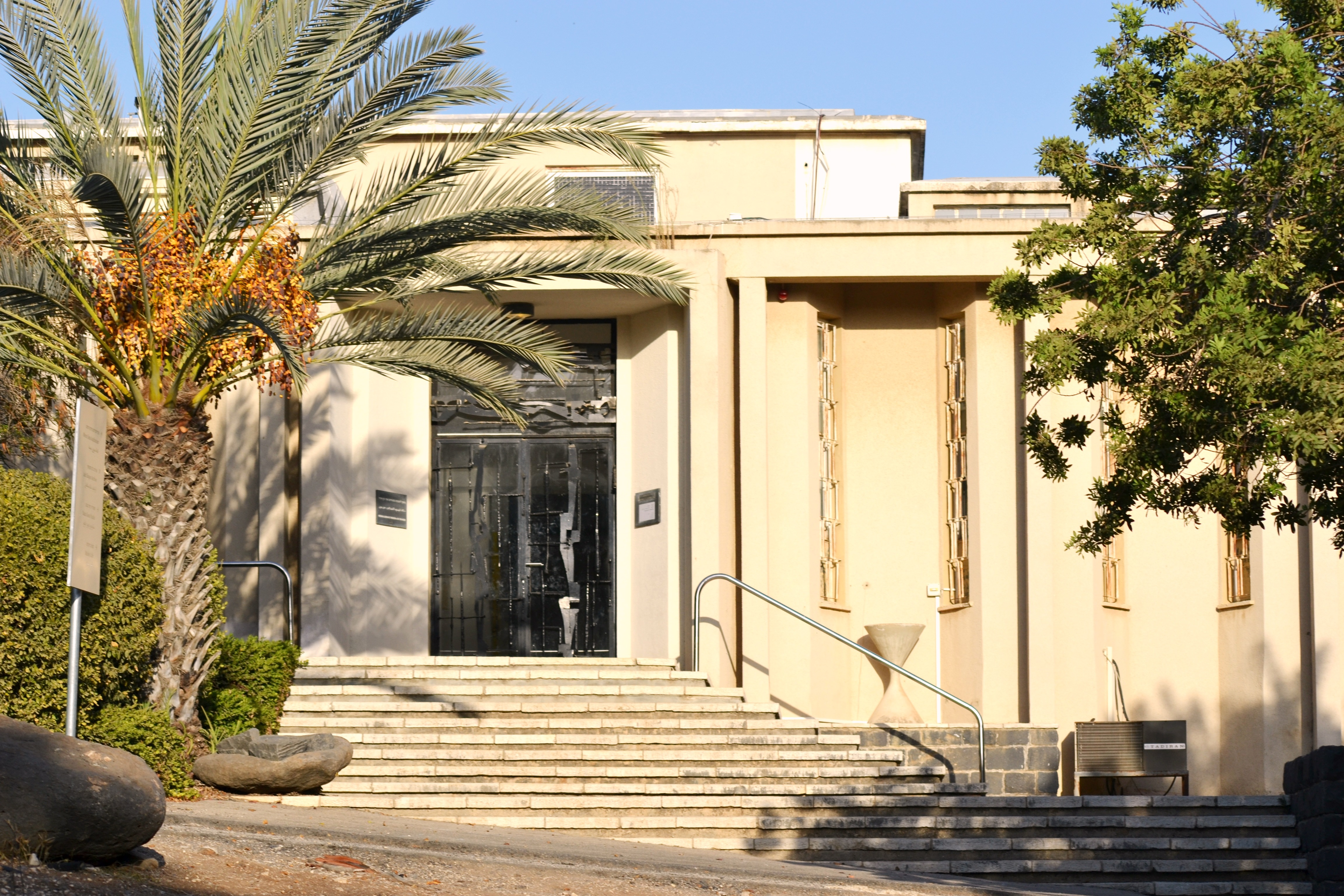
- Established: 1937
- Location: Ein Harod (Meuhad), Israel
- Type: Art museum
- Website: museumeinharod.org.il

Mishkan Museum of Art (Mishkan LeOmanut, Hebrew: המשכן לאמנות על שם חיים אתר, romanized: Haim Atar Art House) is an Israeli art museum located on the grounds of Kibbutz Ein Harod Meuhad.

== History ==
Mishkan LeOmanut was the first rural museum in Israel and the first museum run by a kibbutz. One of the kibbutz members, painter Haim Atar, organized an "art corner" in his studio, a small wooden hut, in 1937. It developed into a museum specializing in the work of Jewish artists from the Diaspora and Jewish folk art. Today it is one of Israel's major art institutions.

An imposing museum building, designed by an architect Samuel Bickels, was inaugurated in 1948. Later the building became a source of inspiration for some of the 20th century's leading architects, among them Louis Kahn and Renzo Piano.

During construction of the museum, the 1952 split of Ein Harod into Ein Harod (Ihud) and Ein Harod (Meuhad) happened, but the museum was preserved as the joint institution for the split kibbutzim. The museum was declared as a "heritage site" by the Council for Conservation of Heritage Sites in Israel.

== See also ==
- List of Israeli museums
- Israeli art
