= Qumya =

Qumya قوميه Kumieh, Qumiya
- Village
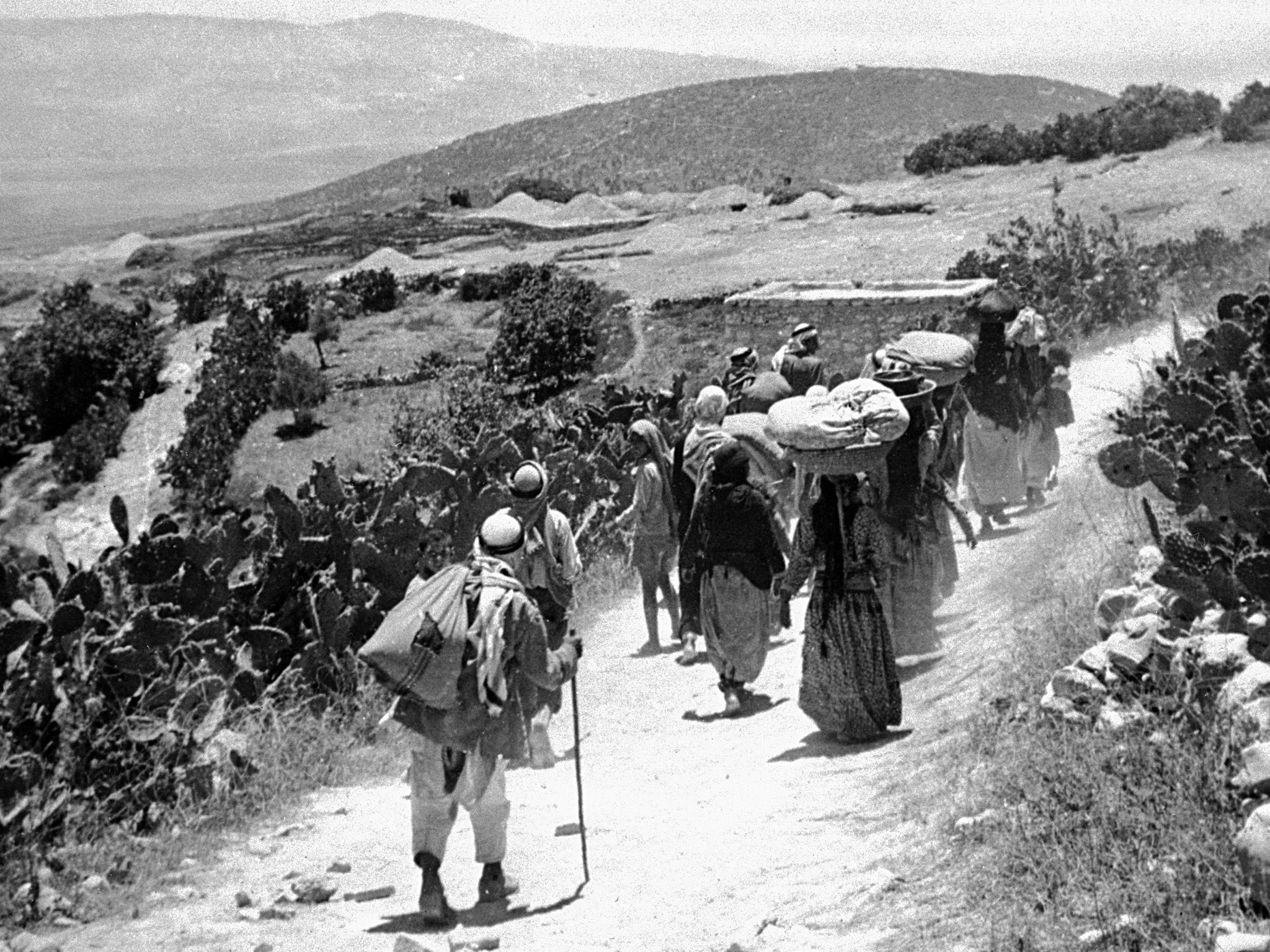
- Qumya, 1948
- Etymology: "Stature", or "Support"
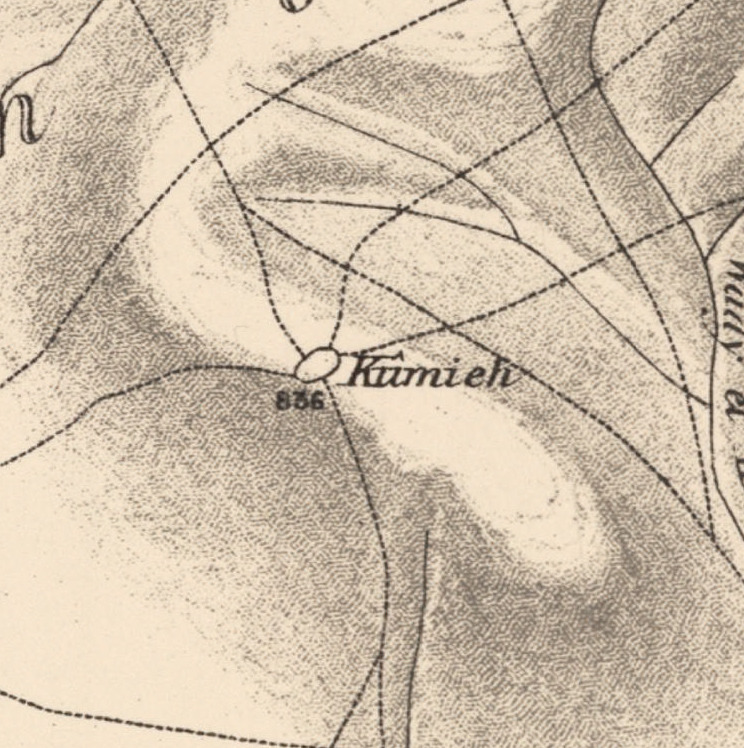
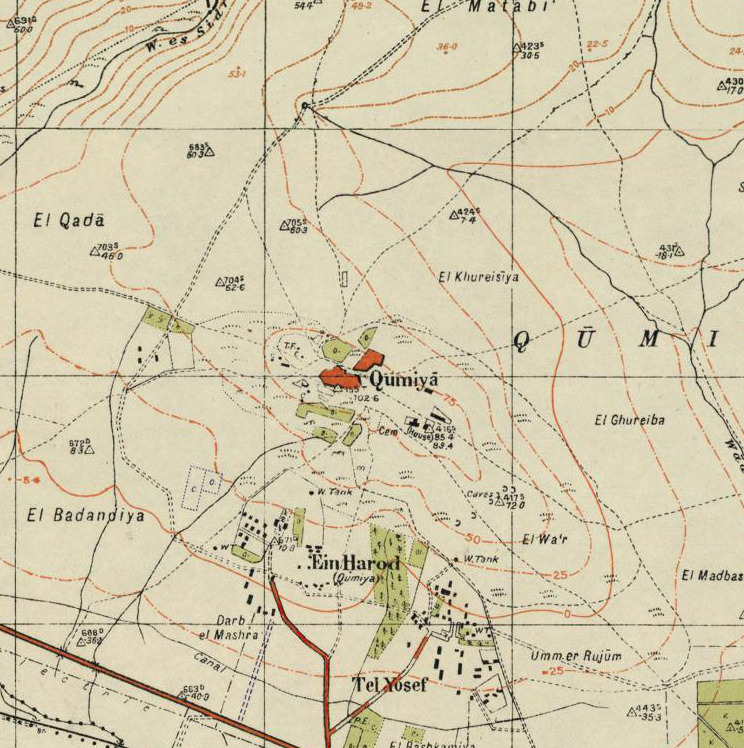
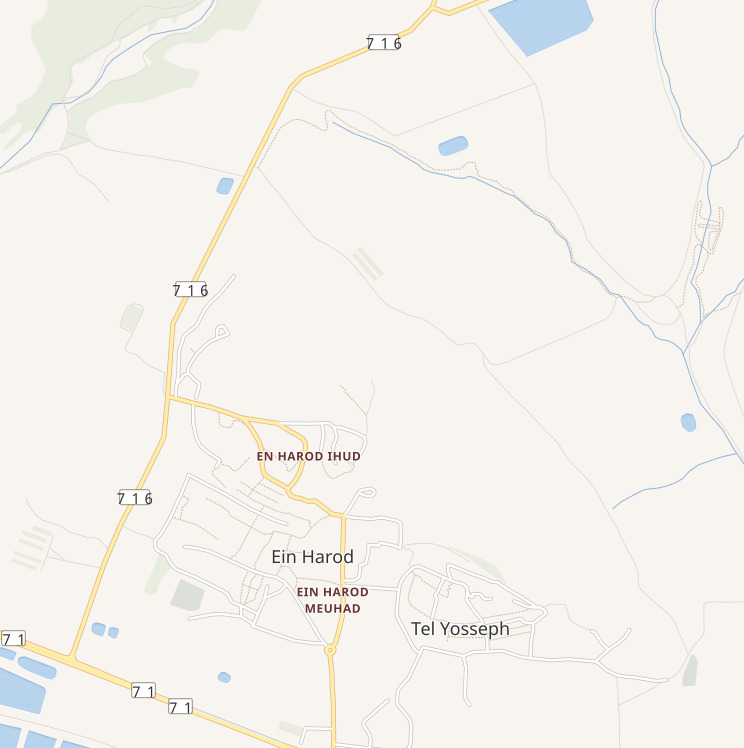
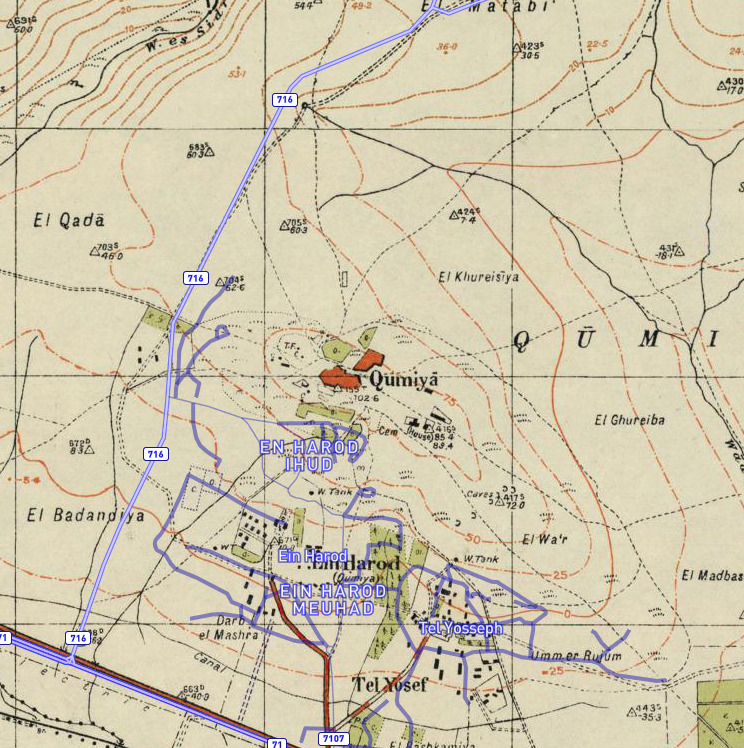
- 1870s map 1940s map modern map 1940s with modern overlay map A series of historical maps of the area around Qumya (click the buttons)

- Location within Mandatory Palestine
- Coordinates: 32°33′55″N 35°23′45″E
- Palestine grid: 187/219
- Geopolitical entity: Mandatory Palestine
- Subdistrict: Baysan
- Date of depopulation: 26 March 1948

Area
  - Total: 4,898 dunams (4.898 km^{2}; 1.891 sq mi)

Population (1945)
  - Total: 440
- Cause(s) of depopulation: Fear of being caught up in the fighting
- Current Localities: Ein Harod (Ihud)

Qumya (Arabic: قوميه), was a Palestinian village of 510 inhabitants when it was depopulated prior to the 1948 Arab-Israeli war.

Located 12.5 kilometers north of Baysan, the village was assaulted by the forces of the Golani Brigade on 26 March 1948 during Operation Gideon, on the orders of Yosef Weitz, a representative of the Jewish National Fund (JNF). Its inhabitants fled in fear of being caught in the fighting.

== Location ==
The village was located 12.5 kilometers northwest of Baysan, on a hilltop. Together with the village of Shatta, it was considered the western gate to the plain of Baysan.

== History ==
Qumya was well known for its archaeological sites, including Khirbat Qumya which contained rectangular structures, caves, and rock-hewn cisterns. About 800 meters south-west of the village was Ayn Jalut, an archaeological site where Roman artifacts, including milestones and a large pool cut in the rock, have been found.

=== Ottoman era ===
By 1596, under the rule of the Ottoman Empire, Qumya was a farm under the administrative jurisdiction of Sanjak Lajjun.

Pierre Jacotin named the village Kouni on his map from 1799.

In 1870/1871 (1288 AH), an Ottoman census listed the village in the nahiya (sub-district) of Shafa al-Shamali.

In 1882, the PEF's Survey of Western Palestine described the village of Qumya as located being located on a knoll in the middle of a valley, surrounded by gardens of prickly pear.

=== British Mandate era ===
In the 1922 census of Palestine, conducted by the Mandatory Palestine authorities, Qumiyeh had a population of 401, all Muslims, decreasing in the 1931 census to 386, still all Muslims, in 88 houses.

The village had one elementary school for boys. In 1945 the village had 440 Muslim inhabitants, with 4,898 dunums of land. Of this, a total of 4,205 dunums were used for cereals and 33 dunums were irrigated or used for orchards, while 15 dunams was built-up land.

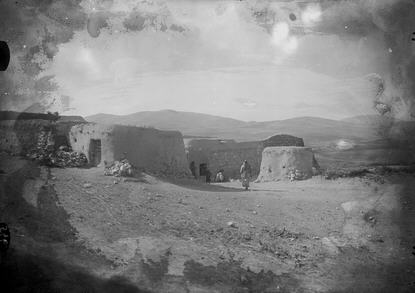
Qumya 1926

=== 1948, and after ===
In his diary, Weitz wrote of the inhabitants of Qumya and al-Tira in the Bisan valley on the 26 March 1948:

"Not taking upon themselves the responsibility of preventing the infiltration of irregulars ... They must be forced to leave their villages until peace comes.

Meron Benvenisti noted that the JNF guided military operations to evacuate and expropriate the land of Palestinian villages in 1948, including that of Qumya. In writing of the capture and evacuation of Qumya and Endur (the biblical Endor), he wrote that "The Jews were particularly interested in the village of Qumya, which was entirely surrounded by JNF land...".

Benny Morris puts 26 March 1948 as depopulation day, and noted "Fear of fighting" as reason. Rosemarie Esber interviewed villager Ayshi Mahmud Khalid who recalled that the villagers left together on the 26th: "Some left for Nazareth and some left for Jordan. We were afraid of Jewish attacks....On our way we passed by Ma’oz settlement. Jewish women came to search us and stole our money....the Jews stole even our livestock". The Qumya villagers ended up in Baysan, from where they were expelled in May, 1948, with the rest of the Palestinian inhabitants.

In an Israeli cabinet meeting on June 16, 1948, Aharon Zisling seems to argue that the Palestinian refugees should be allowed to return. However, he made an exception for the villagers Qumya, the lands of which overlooked his own home in Ein Harod. By July, 1948, Ein Harod formally asked for the land of Qumya to be given them.

Following the war the area was incorporated into the State of Israel. Kibbutz Bet ha-Shittah and the Gush Nuris villages were given thousands of dunams of land from Qumya and the neighbouring villages of al-Murassas, Kafra, Yubla, and Zir'in by the Histadrut's Agicrultural Center in July and October 1948.

The Jewish kibbutz of Ein Harod was built on what traditionally was the village lands in 1921. In the 1950s it split in two; Ein Harod (Ihud) and Ein Harod (Meuhad), where Ein Harod (Ihud) is on Qumya land, while Ein Harod (Meuhad) is on land traditionally belonging to Tamra. Geva is about 2 km west of the village site, but not on village land.

In 1992, Walid Khalidi described the remaining village structures, noting:

"The whole site is fenced in. Almond, mulberry, and pomegranate trees and cactuses grow around the rubble that dots the village site. Cypress trees grow among the ruins of the village school."

== See also ==
- Depopulated Palestinian locations in Israel

== Bibliography ==
- Barron, J.B., ed. (1923). Palestine: Report and General Abstracts of the Census of 1922. Government of Palestine.
- Benvenisti, M. (2000). Sacred Landscape: The Buried History of the Holy Land Since 1948. University of California Press. ISBN 978-0-520-23422-2.
- Conder, C.R.; Kitchener, H.H. (1882). The Survey of Western Palestine: Memoirs of the Topography, Orography, Hydrography, and Archaeology. Vol. 2. London: Committee of the Palestine Exploration Fund.
- Department of Statistics (1945). Village Statistics, April, 1945. Government of Palestine.
- Esber, R. (2008). Under the Cover of War, The Zionist Expulsions of the Palestinians. Arabicus Books & Media. ISBN 978-0-9815131-7-1.
- Fischbach, Michael R. (2012). Records of dispossession: Palestinian refugee property and the Arab–Israeli conflict (Illustrated ed.). Columbia University Press. ISBN 978-0-231-12978-7.
- Hadawi, S (1970). Village Statistics of 1945: A Classification of Land and Area ownership in Palestine. Palestine Liberation Organization Research Center.
- Karmon, Y. (1960). "An Analysis of Jacotin's Map of Palestine" (PDF). Israel Exploration Journal. 10 (3, 4): 155–173, 244–253. Archived from the original (PDF) on 2019-12-22.
- Khalidi, W. (1992). All That Remains:The Palestinian Villages Occupied and Depopulated by Israel in 1948. Washington D.C.: Institute for Palestine Studies. ISBN 0-88728-224-5.
- Mills, E., ed. (1932). Census of Palestine 1931. Population of Villages, Towns and Administrative Areas. Jerusalem: Government of Palestine.
- Morris, B. (2004). The Birth of the Palestinian Refugee Problem Revisited. Cambridge University Press. ISBN 0-521-00967-7.
- Palmer, E.H. (1881). The Survey of Western Palestine: Arabic and English Name Lists Collected During the Survey by Lieutenants Conder and Kitchener, R. E. Transliterated and Explained by E.H. Palmer. Committee of the Palestine Exploration Fund.
