= Ma'ayan Harod =

Spring in the Jezreel Valley, Israel

- Ain Jalut
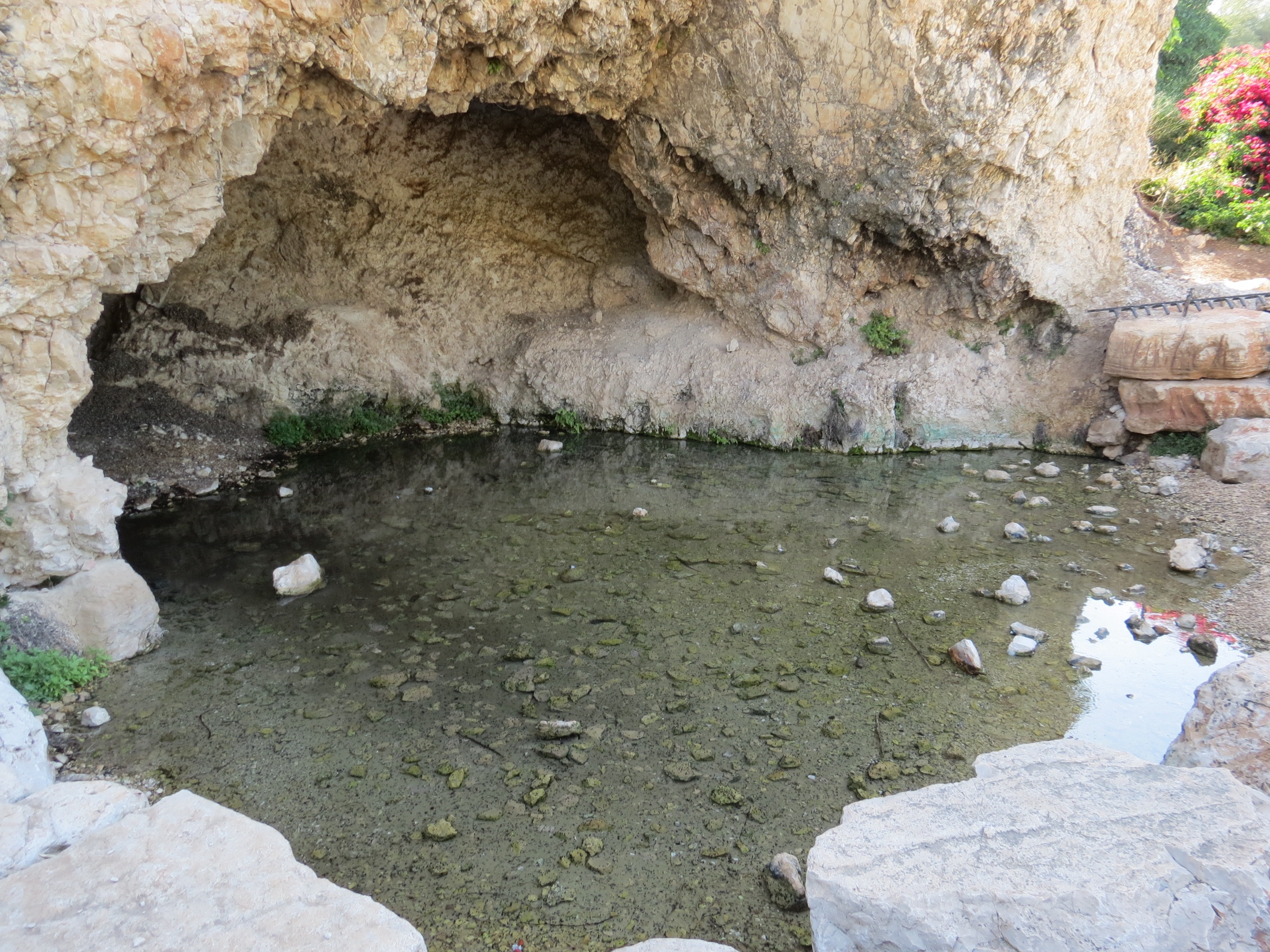
- Gideon's cave, from where the waters emerge

- Location within Israel
- Interactive map of Ma'ayan Harod
- Name origin: Hebrew: "Harod's Spring"; Arabic: "Spring of Jalut (Goliath)"
- Location: Ma'ayan Harod National Park; Harod Valley, Jezreel Valley, northern Israel
- Coordinates: 32°32′56″N 35°21′25″E
- Elevation: approx. −100 m (−330 ft)
- Duration: Perennial
- Discharge: ~360 m³/hour

Ma'ayan Harod (Hebrew: מעיין חרוד, lit. 'Harod's spring') or Ain Jalut (Arabic: عين جالوت ‘ayn Jālūt, or عين جالود ‘ayn Jālūd, and Hebrew: גילות, romanized: ain djeluth) is an all-year spring in the Harod Valley (the easternmost part of the Jezreel Valley) on the northwest corner of Mount Gilboa, that was the location of the 13th-century Battle of Ain Jalut. This was a major turning point in world history that saw the Mamluks inflict the first of two defeats on the Mongols that ultimately halted their invasion of the Levant and prevented an invasion of Egypt.

The traditional name of Ain Jalut has been used since the 12th century and is commonly believed to mean "Spring of Goliath". Alternative etymologies have suggested that it might be derived from the name Gilead, potentially an archaic name for Mount Gilboa. Other names given to the site include "En Harod" or "Ein Harod", a biblical place name that was associated with Ain Jalut in the 19th century; subsequent scholarship, specifically the work of Israel Finkelstein and Oded Lipschits, has refuted this connection. Other associations have also been suggested, including in the 1841 Biblical Researches in Palestine, which linked it to the "spring in Jezreel" where Saul pitched his tent before his final battle, but this was rejected in 1847 and has gained little traction since. The spring is still sometimes known as the "Fountain of Jezreel", as well as "Gideon's Fountain".

According to the medieval chronicler Baha ad-Din ibn Shaddad, there was a prosperous village at the site in the Middle Ages. It was captured by the Crusaders and retaken by Saladin in 1183 CE (579 AH). A later Palestinian village was also established in the area in the late 19th century. In the 1920s, the Zionist activist Yehoshua Hankin purchased the surrounding area as part of the Sursock Purchases through the Palestine Land Development Company, and founded a kibbutz, which he called Ein Harod, near the spring. The site is today incorporated into the Ma'ayan Harod National Park, administered by the Israel Nature and Parks Authority.

== Geography ==
The spring is located in the Harod Valley, which is the eastern part of the Jezreel Valley. While the Jezreel Valley is drained via the Kishon River to the Mediterranean Sea, the Harod Valley is drained through the Harod Stream ("Wadi Jalud" in Arabic) to the Jordan River. It is the largest of the springs emerging on the northern slopes of Mount Gilboa. The source of the spring as well as other springs in the Beit She'an Valley to the east, comes from fresh rainwater that percolate into the limestone hills of Samaria and collect in an underground water reservoir beneath the areas of the cities of Nablus and Jenin. The water emerges from the hills as they incline north towards the valleys. At this valley the waters emerge from a natural cave known as "Gideon's Cave". The spring's discharge rate is about 360 cubic meters per hour. According to the PEF's Survey of Western Palestine in 1882, Victor Guérin stated that the rock from which the fountain springs has been artificially hollowed into a cavern.

== Names and identification with biblical events ==
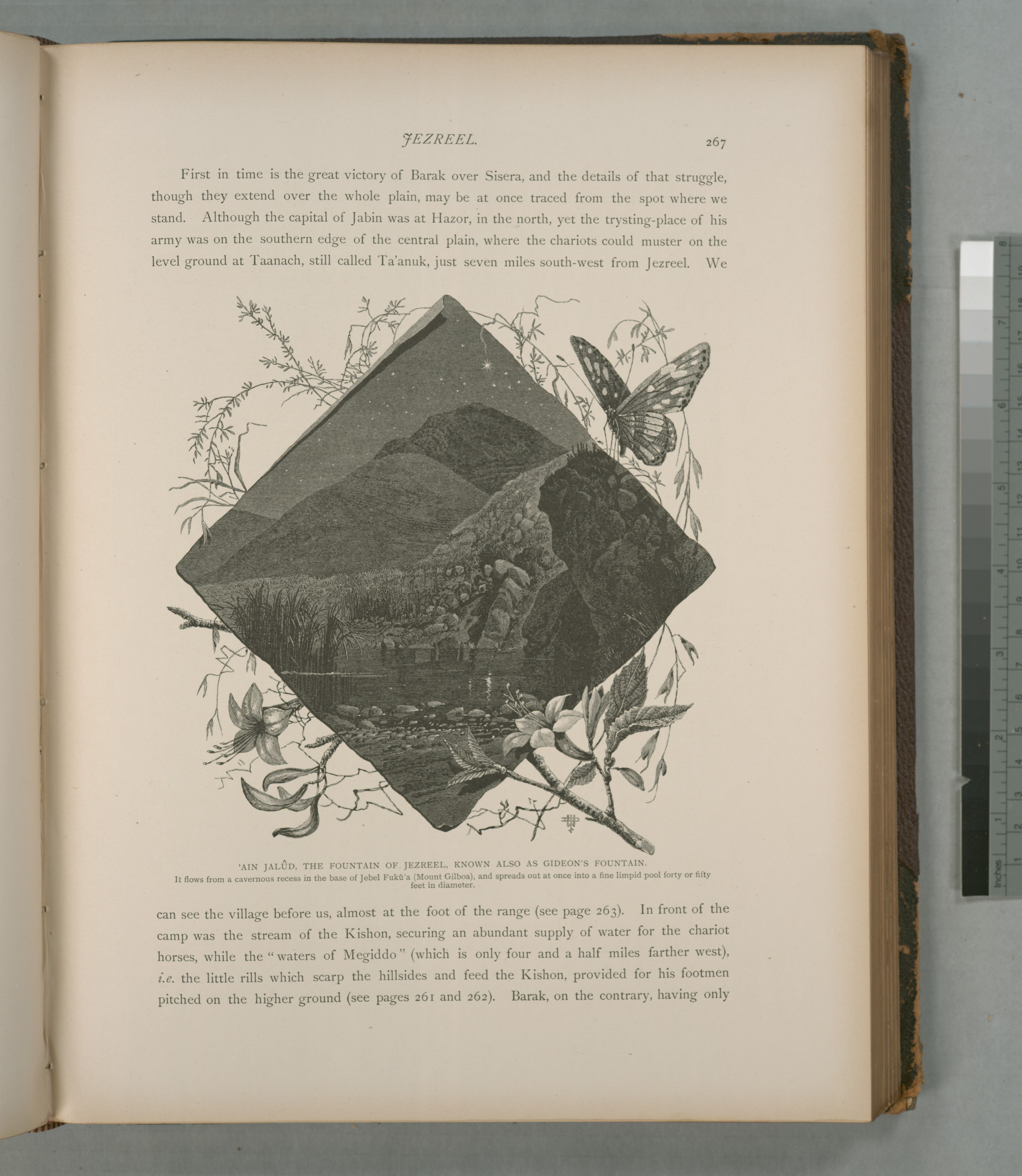
The entry on the spring from the 1881 book Picturesque Palestine, Sinai, and Egypt edited by Charles William Wilson after the 1870s PEF Survey of Palestine

The spring has been variously identified with sdveral biblical sites and events: the battle between David and Goliath; En Harod, the spring where Gideon selected his troops before his battle against the Midianites; the "spring which is in Jezreel" where David set up camp (1 Sam 29:1); and King Saul's stopover before the Battle of Gilboa. None is consensual and all are rejected by more recent research.

The spring is first recorded as Ain Jalut in the 12th century by Baha ad-Din ibn Shaddad in his biography of Saladin. In that work, the name is presumed to mean "Goliath's spring", alluding to the tale of David and Goliath, with "Jalut" presumed to be an Arabization of "Goliath". This follows a longstanding tradition of narration in relation to the spring. An anonymous Christian traveler from Burdigala mentioned in the year 333/34 a place near the city of Jezreel where biblical David killed Goliath. Kurdish-Jewish folklore similarly places the battle at the "fields of Megiddo" in the Jezreel Valley.

In the 14th century, the Jewish geographer Ishtori Haparchi identified Ain Jalut with the biblical "spring which is in Jezreel", as well as where the Israelite king Saul prepared his army before the Battle of Gilboa, in which he and his son were ultimately killed. Haparchi dismissed the connection of the spring to Goliath, suggesting that the biblical battle took place between Sokho and Azekah, in Judea, not the Jezreel Valley.

In the 19th century, Arthur Penrhyn Stanley, in his 1856 book Sinai and Palestine, similarly associated Ain Jalut with the "Spring of Jezreel", and also suggested that this could be the same site as En Harod, a place mentioned in the story of Gideon's battle with the Midianites. The name "En Harod" translates literally as the "spring of trembling (or anxiety)", a toponym thought to have been used "as a literary allusion to the fear and anxiety of the warriors" ahead of the battle. Stanley noted that the then-modern name, "Ain Jahlood" or "Spring of Goliath", may have originated from a confused recollection of the earlier stories, as observed by Carl Ritter in his 1866 geography of Palestine, but "more probably arose from a false tradition in the 6th century". He separately noted the suggestion by Rabbi Joseph Schwarz, in his 1850 Descriptive Geography of Palestine, that the name "Jalud" could instead be derived from the name "Gilead". Schwarz suggested that this might reminisce an older name for Mount Gilboa, and thus explain the cry of Gideon ahead of his battle: "Whoever is fearful and afraid, let him return, and depart early from Mount Gilead." Schwarz alternatively explains "Mount Gilead" as a "general phrase for the whole tribe" of Manasseh. George Adam Smith, writing in 1920, also noted the similarity of "Jalud" with "Gilead".

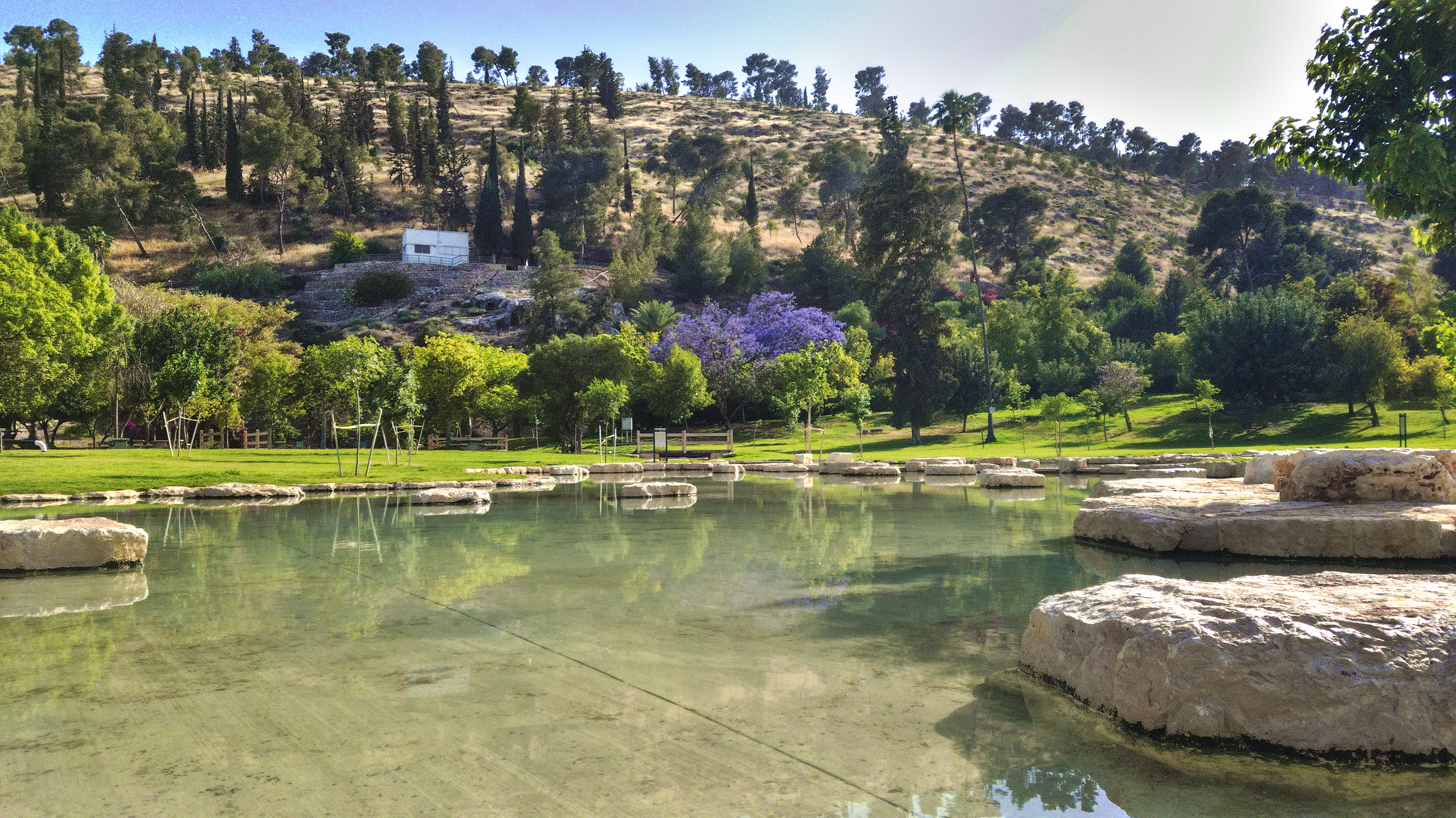
Ma'ayan Harod, 2017

Little consensus has emerged regarding the association of either biblical place name. The connection of Ain Jalut with the Jezreel spring was rejected by John Wilson in 1847, who identified the Jezreel spring as closer to the ancient city, known today as "Ein Jezreel". In 1874, Victor Guérin countered that although there is a spring closer to the ancient city of Jezreel, the spring in Ain Jalut is much larger and is therefore more likely to be the spring where Saul set his military camp. In 1920, George Adam Smith identified the "fountain which is in Jezreel" in Ein Ganim (Jenin), on the other side of Mount Gilboa. Smith suggested that "Jezreel" in that context was not the city, but the name of the district in which the biblical spring was located.

In 1882, Claude Reignier Conder identified the biblical En Harod spring with "Ain el-Jemain", a spring in the nearby Beit She'an Valley. Biblical En Harod was again associated with Ain Jalut by the Encyclopaedia Biblica in 1903, and by Smith in 1920.

=== Theory: biblical En Harod was near Shechem ===
In 2017, Israel Finkelstein and Oded Lipschits rejected a link between biblical En Harod and Ain Jalut, asserting that the Battle of Gilboa actually took place near Shechem (modern day Nablus), after which the Israelites chased the Midianites to Succoth, which is east of the Jordan River. They noted that Josephus also located the battle next to the Jordan River in Antiquities of the Jews.

== History ==
=== Medieval period ===
The Itinerarium Burdigalense (586) notes "ibi est campus, ubi David Goliat occidit" in reference to a location just before Scythopolis.

In the 12th century, a village or a town existed next to the spring and bore its name. Baha ad-Din ibn Shaddad, in his Life of Saladin, wrote that "The Sultan continued his march to el-Jalut, a prosperous village, near which there is a spring (ain), and here he pitched his camp".

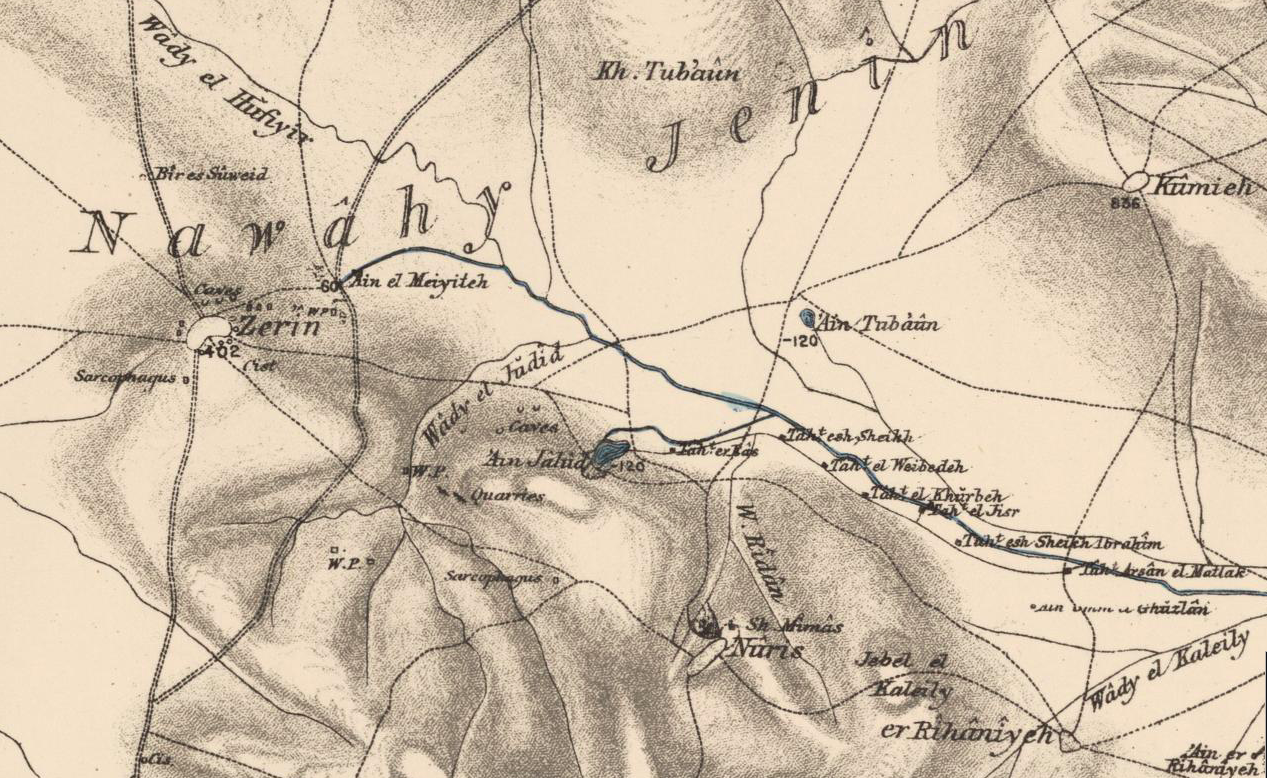
Ain Jalut in the 1870s PEF Survey of Palestine, surrounded by Zerin to the northwest, Qumya to the northeast, and Nuris and Rihaniyeh to the southeast

Yaqut al-Hamawi mentions Ain Jalut as "a small and pleasant town, lying between Nablus and Baisan, in the Filastin Province. The place was taken by the Rumi (Crusaders), and retaken by Saladin in 579 (1183 CE)."

In the Battle of Ain Jalut in 1260, the Mamluks defeated the Mongol army of Hulagu Khan under the command of Kitbuqa. In that battle, the Mamluks used the terrain of Ain Jalut to their advantage, concealing their main army in the trees on adjacent hills before provoking the Mongols with a decoy force. When the Mongols had been lured into the ambush, the main Mamluk army attacked from all sides. Routed, the Mongols were forced to retreat to Beisan.

The battle later influenced Palestinian nationalism. One of the three original brigades of the Palestine Liberation Army was named "Ain Jalut", after the battle. In July 1970, Yasser Arafat referred to the modern area in the context of the historical battle:

This will not be the first time that our people has vanquished its enemies. The Mongols came and swept away the Abbasid caliphate, then they came to Ain Jalut in our land – in the same region where we are today fighting the Zionists – and they were defeated at Ain Jalut.

=== 20th century ===
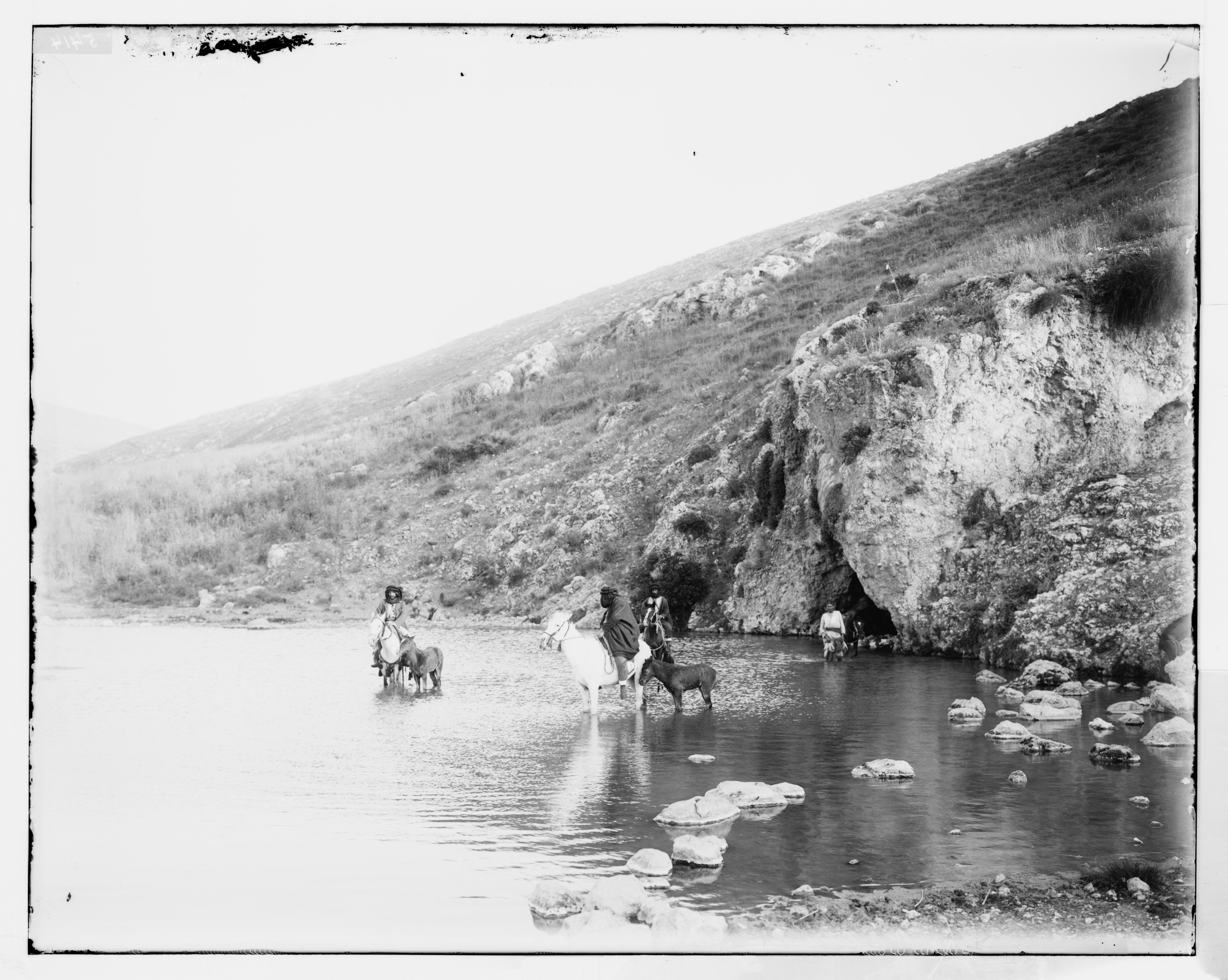
Ain Jalud at the turn of the 20th century

In the early 20th century the spring and the surrounding area were owned by the Sursock family from Beirut, who had bought the land from the Ottoman government in 1872 and established a small village in the area.

The area was acquired by the Jewish community as part of the Sursock Purchase. In 1921, when the land was sold by the Sursocks, the nine families who lived here petitioned the new British administration for perpetual ownership, but were only offered a short lease with an option to buy.

==== Kibbutz Ein Harod ====
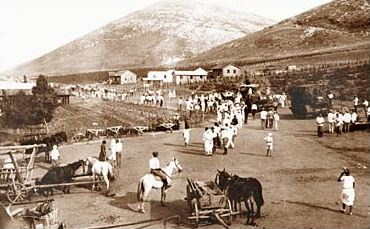
The settlement near the spring. Mount Gilboa can be seen in the background. (1920–1925)

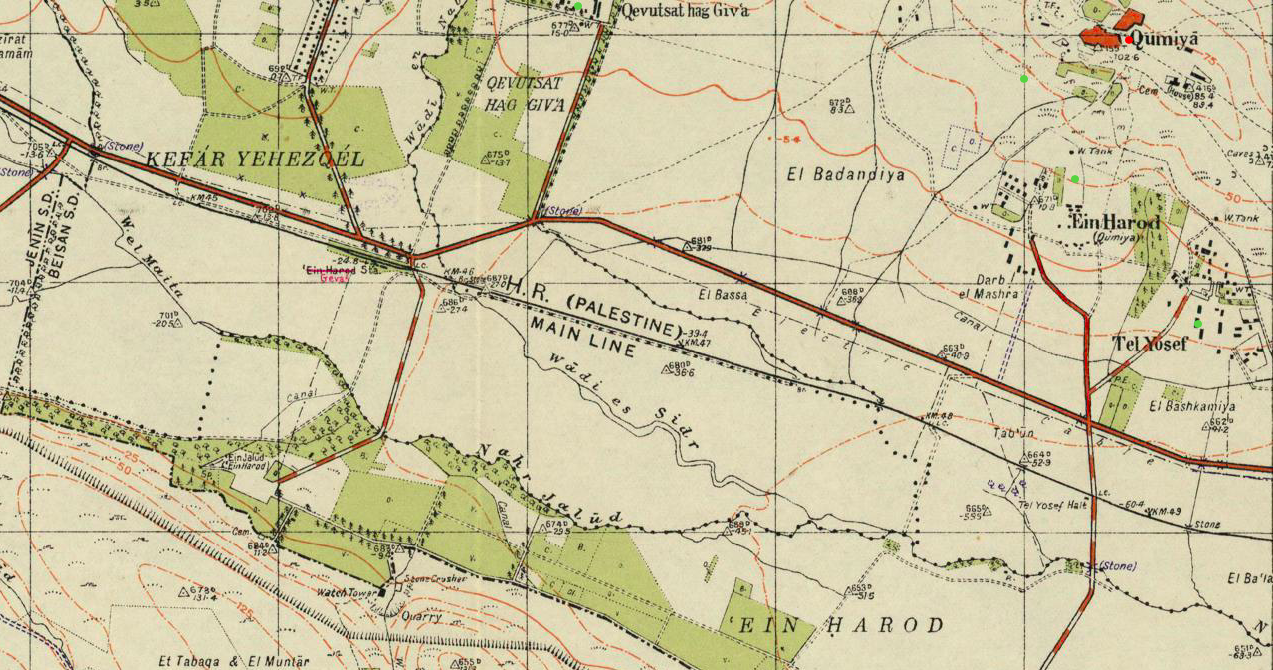
1940s Survey of Palestine map of the area

The land, named the "Nuris Bloc" after a nearby Arab village, was instead bought by the Zionist activist Yehoshua Hankin, through the Palestine Land Development Company. Hankin founded a kibbutz, which he called Ein Harod, near the spring.

In 1921, Hankin sent members of Gdud HaAvoda, a Zionist work group, to settle in the territory. Shlomo Lavi, among the leaders of the Gdud, had envisioned the "Big Kvutza", a settlement consisting of several farms spread on vast terrain with both agriculture and industry. His plan was approved by the World Zionist Organization, but with some limitations on his detailed vision. The Gdud began this settlement near the Ain Jalut which was known to Jews as Ein Harod. Yehuda Kopolevitz Almog, one of the Gdud's leaders, describes that in the first day the settlers set up tents and began enclosing their camp with barbwire and defensive trenches.

The first 74 members pioneers were split into two groups. One of the Second Aliyah, former members of Hashomer and Kvutzat Kinneret, and the other from the Third Aliyah. In the first months, the settlers sowed fields, planted a eucalyptus grove, paved roads and dried swamps. An Ulpan, a school for learning Hebrew was set up in the camp. In December 1921, a second farm called Tel Yosef (after Joseph Trumpeldor) was established by members of the Gdud on the hill of Qumya. Disagreements on funds and internal politics have led Ein Harod and Tel Yosef to part ways in 1923, with many members leaving the former for the latter. The group that remained in Ein Harod included 110 members and was headed by Lavi, Yitzhak Tabenkin, Aharon Zisling and David Maletz. The group at Ein Harod continued to get little support from the Zionist organizations and after the 1929 Palestine riots, the members chose to move their camp from the area of the spring to the hill of Qumya, next to Tel Yosef and thus the settlement at the spring was abandoned.

The spring continued to be used as a camp site for the pioneers of Beit HaShita and Dovrat before their departure to their permanent locations. In 1949 a village named Gidona was established next to the spring for Jewish immigrants from Yemen.

In 1952, the Ein Harod community split into two separate entities, Ein Harod (Ihud) and Ein Harod (Meuhad).

=== 21st century ===
==== National park ====
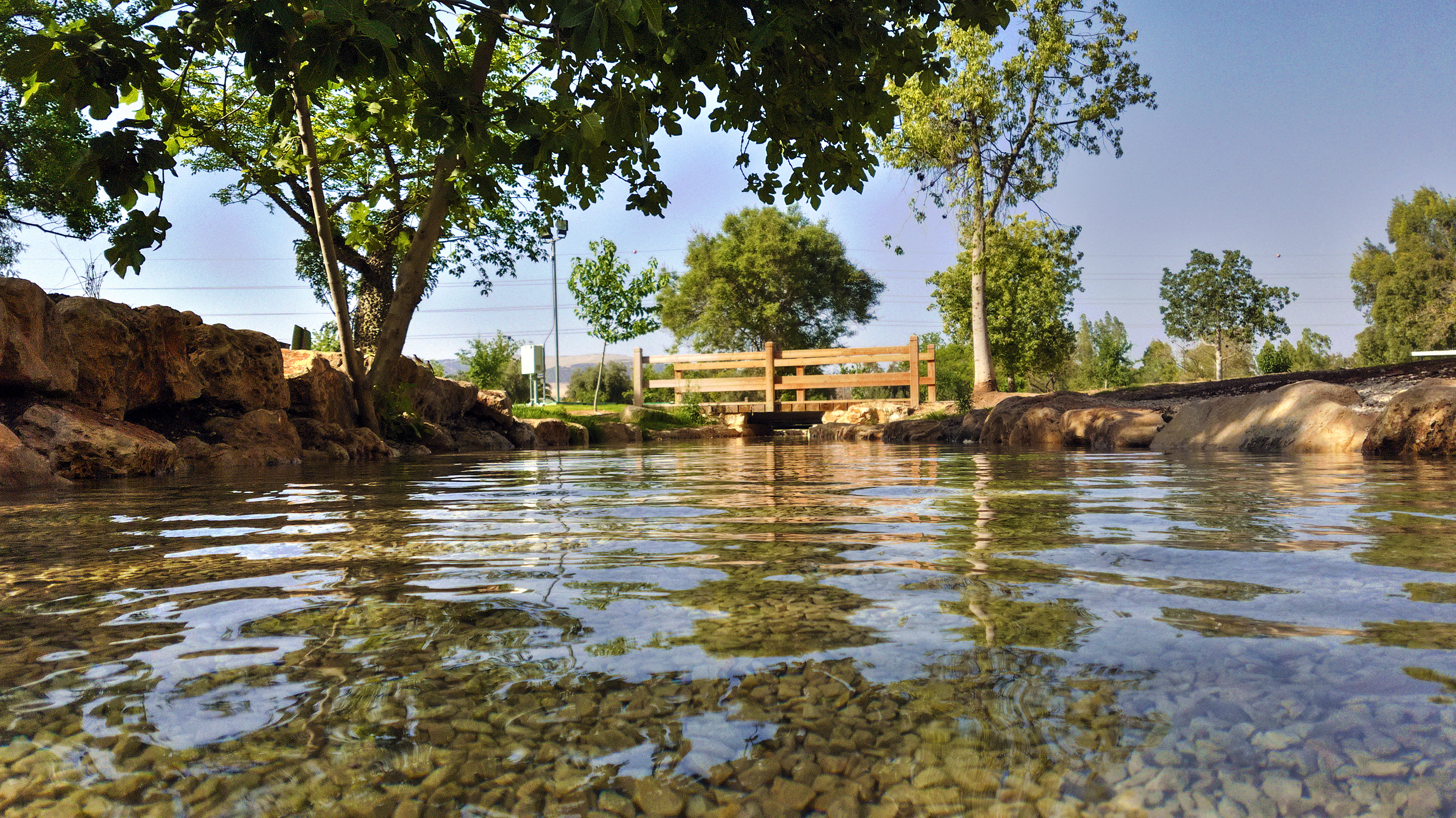
Ma'ayan Harod National Park

The spring is now part of a national park called the Ma'ayan Harod National Park, which features a recreational swimming pool fed by the spring's waters. The park also contains the house built at the site by the Hankins, which has become a museum. Adjacent to this there is a war memorial for residents of the valley who died in Israel's wars.

The park has been described as "well maintained", but visitors to the site "have absolutely no way of knowing that one of the climactic battles of the Middle Ages was fought in it".

== Archaeology ==
An archaeological survey conducted in the 20th century found flour mills and the remains of an aqueduct dated to Islamic times (either before or after the Crusades) in the immediate vicinity of the spring. The surveyors also found a burial tomb and the remains of an oil press. Settlement remains were discovered at the adjacent Gidona and the nearby Giv'at Yehonatan ("Jonathan's Hill").

== Bibliography ==
- Baretz, Julie (June 2015). "Gideon at En Harod Judges 6; 7; 8:22–28 (additional reading: 8:1–21)". The Bible on Location: Off the Beaten Path in Ancient and Modern Israel. University of Nebraska Press, Jewish Publication Society. pp. 37–51. ISBN 978-0-8276-1189-4.
- Conder, Claude Reignier; Kitchener, H.H. (1882). The Survey of Western Palestine: Memoirs of the Topography, Orography, Hydrography, and Archaeology. Vol. 2. London: Committee of the Palestine Exploration Fund. p. 116.
- Finkelstein, Israel; Lipschits, Oded (7 March 2017). "Geographical and Historical Observations on the old North Israelite Gideon tale in Judges". Zeitschrift für die alttestamentliche Wissenschaft. 129 (1): 14–15, 17. doi:10.1515/zaw-2017-0005.
- Guérin, Victor (1874). Description Géographique Historique et Archéologique de la Palestine (in French). Vol. 2: Samarie, pt. 1. Paris: L'Imprimerie Nationale. pp. 308-310.
- Palmer, E.H. (1881). The Survey of Western Palestine: Arabic and English Name Lists Collected During the Survey by Lieutenants Conder and Kitchener, R. E. Transliterated and Explained by E.H. Palmer. Committee of the Palestine Exploration Fund.
- Robinson, Edward; Smith, E. (1841). Biblical Researches in Palestine, Mount Sinai and Arabia Petraea: A Journal of Travels in the year 1838. Vol. 3. Boston: Crocker & Brewster.
- Smith, George Adam (1920). The Historical Geography of the Holy Land Especially in Relation to the History of Israel and of the Early Church. New York: George H. Doran company.
- Stanley, Arthur Penrhyn (2010). Sinai and Palestine: In Connection with Their History. Cambridge University Press. ISBN 978-1-108-01754-1.
- Le Strange, Guy (1890). Palestine Under the Moslems: A Description of Syria and the Holy Land from A.D. 650 to 1500. Committee of the Palestine Exploration Fund.
- Vilnay, Zev (1978). The Sacred Land: Volume 3: Legends of Galilee, Jordan and Sinai. Philadelphia: Jewish Publication Society of America.
