= Harod Stream =

River in Israel

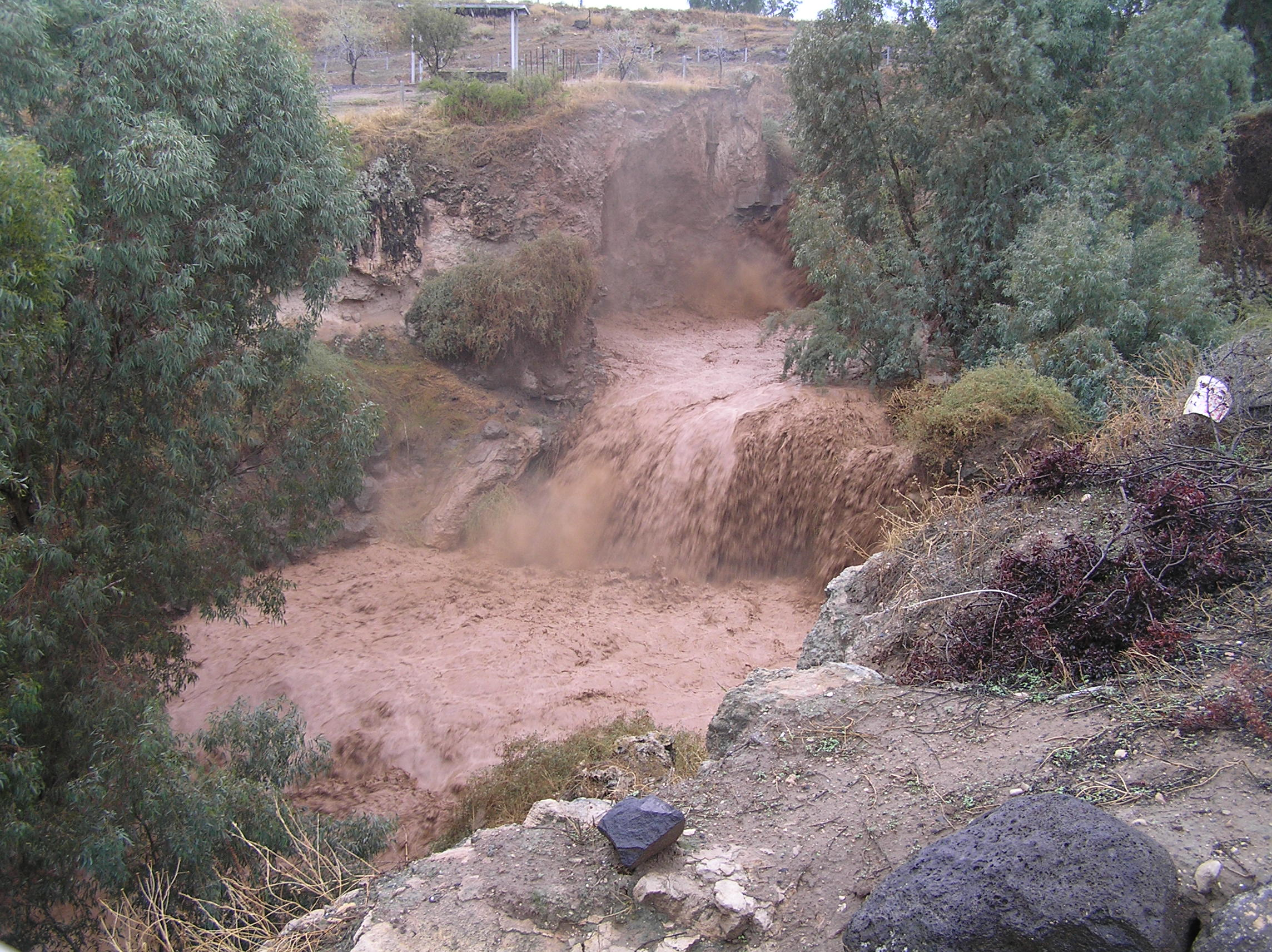

Location
- State: Israel

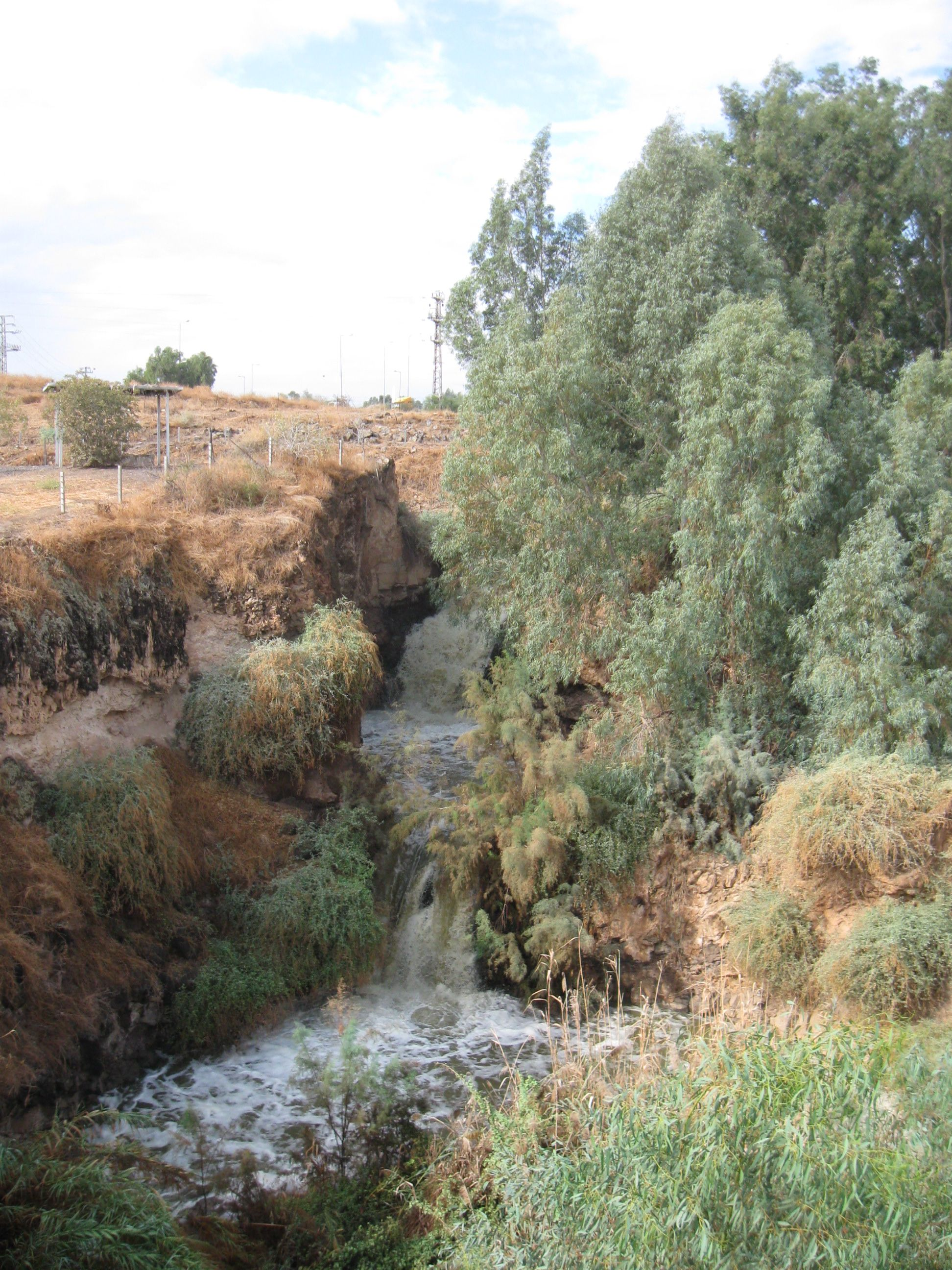
Harod Stream, different season

The Harod Stream Hebrew: נחל חרוד, romanized: Nahal Harod, Arabic: نهر جالود, romanized: Wadi Jalud is a stream in Israel that flows west to east, from the Givat HaMoreh area via the Harod Valley and Beit She'an Valley into the Jordan River, about two kilometres (1.2 mi) north of Ma'oz Haim. It is the main drainage route of the Harod Valley

The elevation is 500 metres (1,600 ft) above sea level at the source and 230 metres (750 ft) below sea level at the mouth (at 32.5144°N 35.5528°E). The drainage basin is 180 km^{2} (69 sq mi).

The total length from the source to mouth is 31 km (19 mi), but the length of the non-intermittent flow is 20 to 22 km (12 to 14 mi). While the original sources of the water are karst springs, most of the stream's water comes from the discharge of numerous fish ponds, irrigation systems, and sewage. Rain floods are rare, and the upper flow of the stream is dry during most of the time. The network of the stream and its tributaries is mostly man-made, and natural riverbeds are preserved at the southern steep slopes of the valley.

== Places of interest ==
- Kantara Bridge; Media related to Kantara Bridge in Nahal Harod at Wikimedia Commons
- Ma'ayan Harod
- Beit She'an National Park
- Highway 71 (Israel)

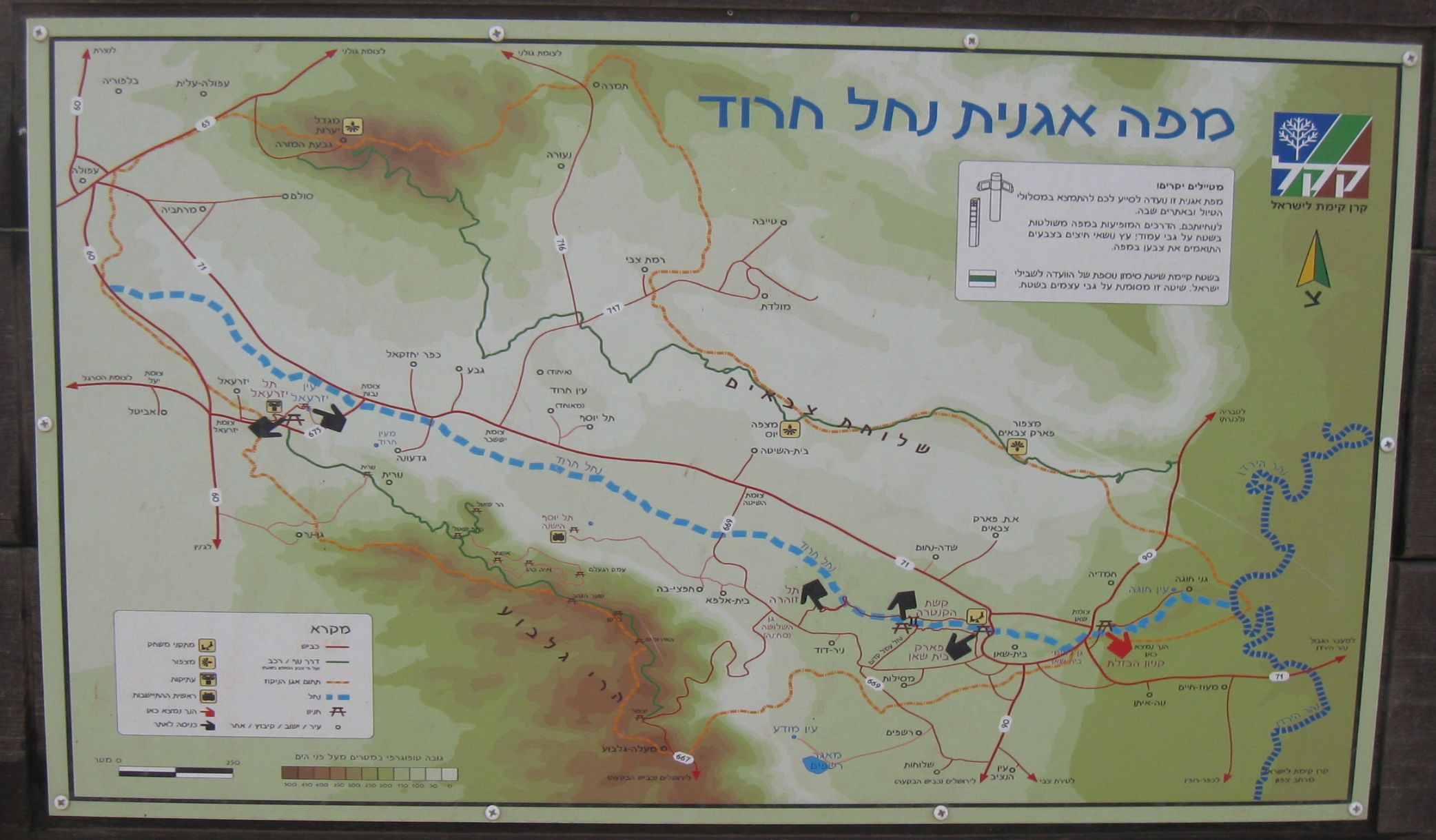
Drainage basin of Harod Stream with a sketch of its watercourse
