= Ein Harod (Ihud) =

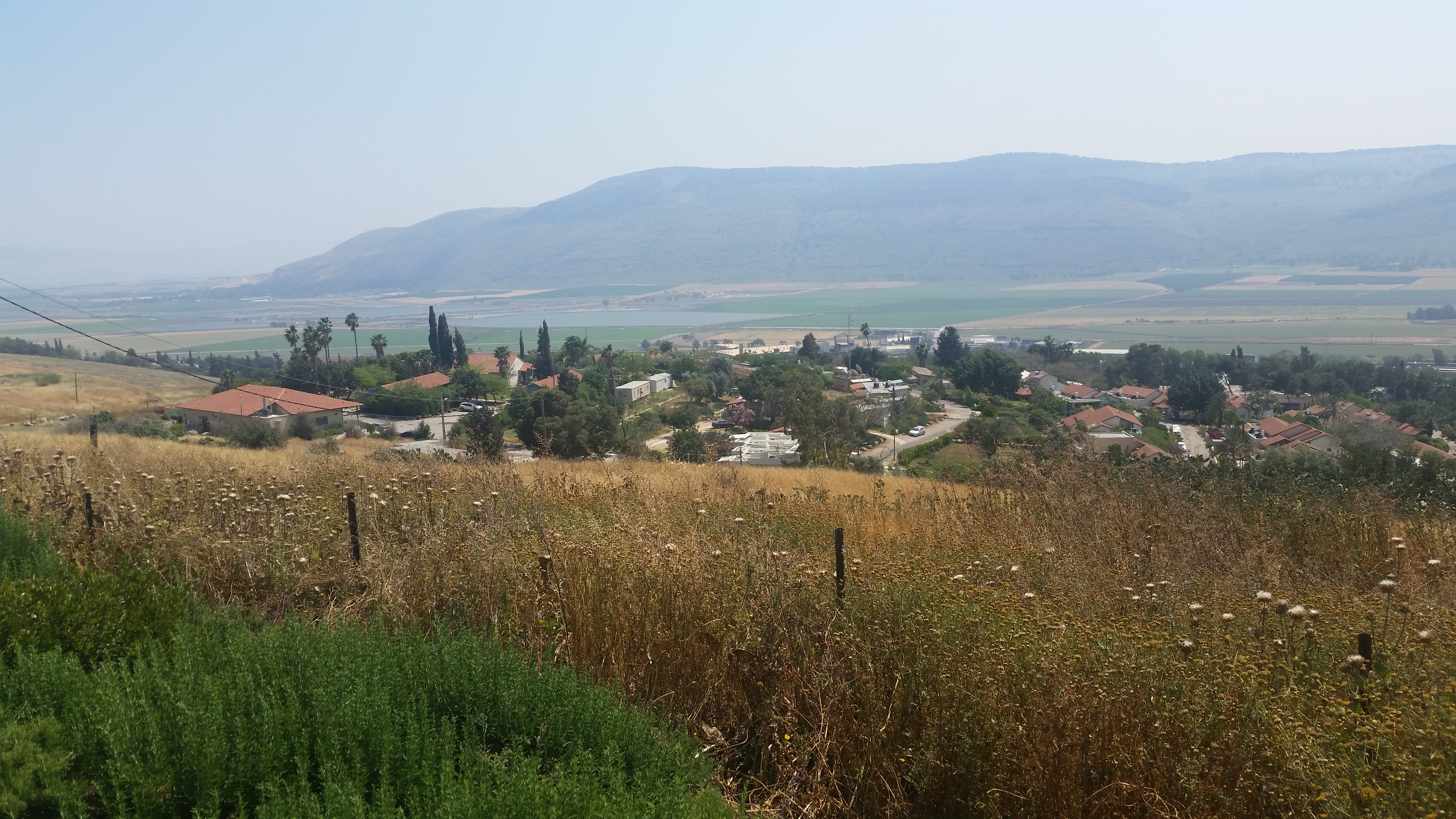

- Location within Jezreel Valley region of Israel
- Coordinates: 32°33′47″N 35°23′30″E
- Country: Israel
- District: Northern
- Subdistrict: Jezreel
- Council: Gilboa
- Affiliation: Kibbutz Movement
- Founded: 1952
- Founder: Mapainiks
- Population (2024): 583

Ein Harod (Ihud) (Hebrew: עֵין חֲרוֹד אִחוּד) is a kibbutz in northern Israel. Located in the Jezreel Valley near Mount Gilboa, it falls under the jurisdiction of Gilboa Regional Council. In 2024 it had a population of 583.

== Etymology ==
The kibbutz is named after the biblical spring of En Harod, which has become associated with the spring known in Hebrew as Ma'ayan Harod and in Arabic as Ain Jalut. The kibbutz is close to this spring, which was the site of the 1260 Battle of Ain Jalut, the first major Mongol defeat in the Mongol invasion of the Levant.

== History ==
It was formed in 1952 as a result of an ideological split in kibbutz Ein Harod (founded 1921), with Mapam-supporting members forming Ein Harod (Meuhad) and Mapai-supporting members breaking away to create Ein Harod (Ihud), which joined the Mapai-affiliated Ihud HaKvutzot veHaKibbutzim. Today both kibbutzim belong to the same movement, the United Kibbutz Movement.

It is located on the land of the depopulated Palestinian village of Qumya.

== Environmentalism ==
Ein Harod Ihud was Israel's first "green" kibbutz. The kibbutz has introduced a whole series of environmental projects. Recycling bins have been installed for sorting waste and an ecological garden is being planted based on a model developed by the Ministry of Environmental Protection and the Technion. The kibbutz is switching to environmentally friendly detergents and has distributed a list of products not tested on animals. An energy survey has been conducted to identify alternative energy sources in the kitchen, laundry and ironing room. Energy consumption is being cut by using energy-saving bulbs and air conditioners, and installing electricity meters in homes and public buildings. The Ministry of Agriculture has approved funding for research on energy efficiency in milk cooling.
