= Ein Harod =

Agricultural community in Israel

Coordinates: 32°33′37″N 35°23′27″E

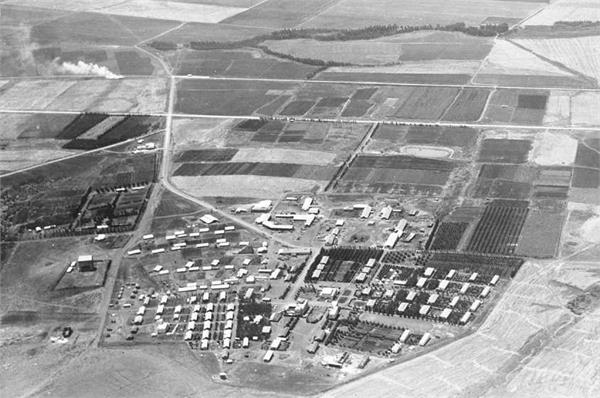
Kibbutz Ein Harod, 1939

Ein Harod (Hebrew: עֵין חֲרוֹד) was a kibbutz in northern Palestine near Mount Gilboa. Founded in 1921, it became the center of Mandatory Palestine's kibbutz movement, hosting the headquarters of the largest kibbutz organisation, HaKibbutz HaMeuhad.

In 1923 part of the community split off into Tel Yosef, and in 1952 the rest of the community split into Ein Harod (Ihud) and Ein Harod (Meuhad).

It was named after the nearby spring then known in Arabic as Ain Jalut, "Spring of Goliath", Hebraized as "Ein Harod", now Ma'ayan Harod. It was built on land formerly belonging to the villages of Qumya and Tamra.

== History ==
=== Middle Ages ===
The original kibbutz was located near the 1260 battlefield of Ayn Jalut, a battle in which the Mongols suffered their first defeat at the hands of the Mamluks, which arguably saved the Mamluk sultanate from annihilation.

=== Ottoman era and British Mandate ===
In the early 20th century the spring and the surrounding area were owned by the Sursock family from Beirut, which had bought the land from the Ottoman government in 1872 and who established a small village in the area.

In 1921, when the land was sold by the Sursocks, the nine families who lived here petitioned the new British administration for perpetual ownership, but were only offered a short lease with an option to buy, and the land was instead acquired by the Jewish community as part of the Sursock Purchases.

Named the "Nuris Bloc" after a nearby Arab village, the area was bought by the Zionist activist Yehoshua Hankin through the Palestine Land Development Company.

=== The kibbutz's first location ===
The kibbutz was founded in 1921 by Russian Jewish pioneers of the Third Aliyah.

In 1921, members of the Gdud HaAvoda "Work Battalion", at a time when their road work was decreasing, set up a work camp in the Harod Valley, the eastern extension of the Jezreel Valley, at the foot of Mount Gilboa. In 1921, 35 young people from the Gdud pitched tents at the Harod Spring.

Shlomo Lavi, among the leaders of the Gdud, had envisioned the "Big Kvutza", a settlement consisting of several farms spread on vast terrain with both agriculture and industry. His plan was approved by the World Zionist Organization, but with some limitations on his detailed vision. The Gdud began this settlement near the Ain Jalut which was known to Jews as Ein Harod. Yehuda Kopolevitz Almog, one of the Gdud's leaders, describes that in the first day the settlers set up tents and began enclosing their camp with barbwire and defensive trenches. The group began to farm land which the Palestine Land Development Company had purchased from the Arab village of Nuris, in the eastern part of the Jezreel Valley. The Gdud members worked here at draining the swamps, a permanent source of malaria.

The first 74 members pioneers were split into two groups. One of the Second Aliyah, former members of Hashomer and Kvutzat Kinneret, and the other from the Third Aliyah. In the first months, the settlers sowed fields, planted a eucalyptus grove, paved roads and dried swamps.

A young Jewish engineer arrived, explaining the major and minor canals of the valley. A team of surveyors then designated which major and minor canals would be dug. The canals were then dug by the Labor Brigade pioneers. Clay pipes are laid that absorb the infested waters of the marshes. The draining project dried the swamps, largely eliminating the mosquitoes and the scourge of malaria. In their place fertile fields emerged.

An Ulpan, a school for learning Hebrew was set up in the camp. In December 1921, a second farm called Tel Yosef (after Joseph Trumpeldor) was established by members of the Gdud on the hill of Qumya. Disagreements on funds and internal politics have led Ein Harod and Tel Yosef to part ways in 1923, with many members leaving the former for the latter. The group that remained in Ein Harod included 110 members and was headed by Lavi, Yitzhak Tabenkin, Aharon Zisling and David Maletz. The group at Ein Harod continued to get little support from the Zionist organizations and after the 1929 Palestine riots, the members chose to move their camp from the area of the spring to the hill of Qumya, next to Tel Yosef and thus the settlement at the spring was abandoned. Two-thirds of the group are believed to have resettled at Tel Yosef. While it's sometimes considered that Ein Ḥarod was founded in 1921 and Tel Yosef in 1923, together they formed one farming unit. The spring continued to be used as a camp site for the pioneers of Beit HaShita and Dovrat before their departure to their permanent locations.

According to a census conducted in 1922 by the British Mandate authorities, Ein Harod had a population of 244 Jews.

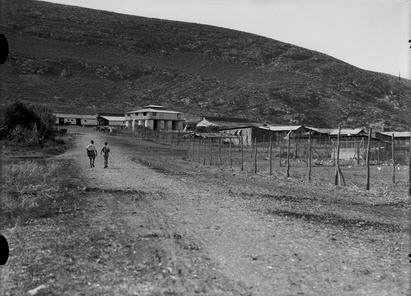
Ein Harod 1925

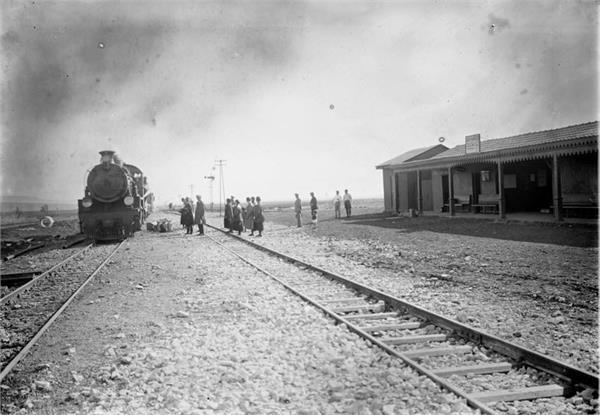
Ein Harod railway station 1925

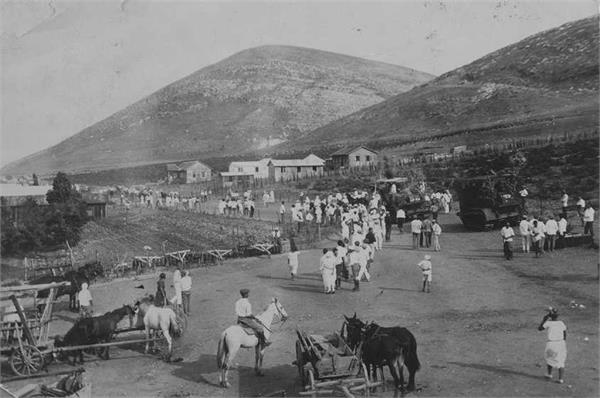
Kibbutz Ein Harod 1926

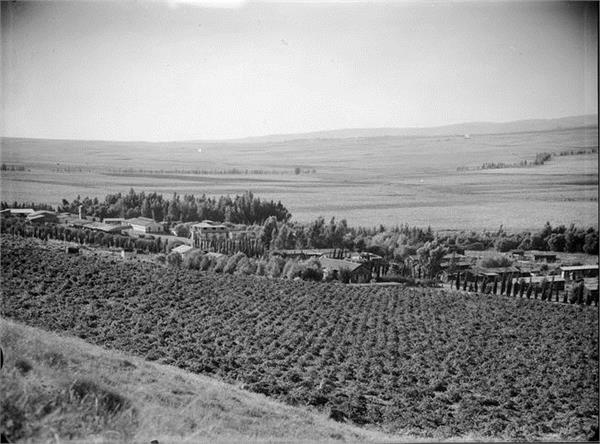
Ein Harod 1930

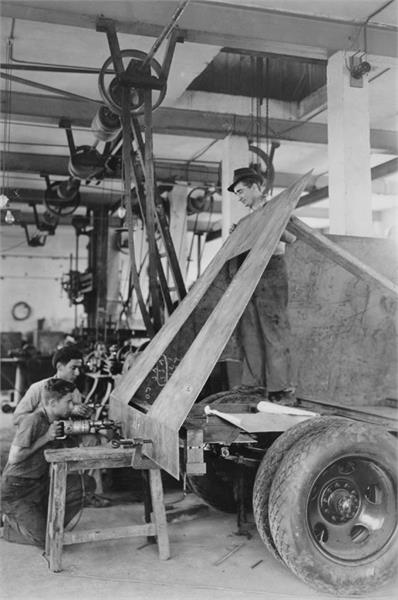
Ein Harod constructing armoured vehicles 1938

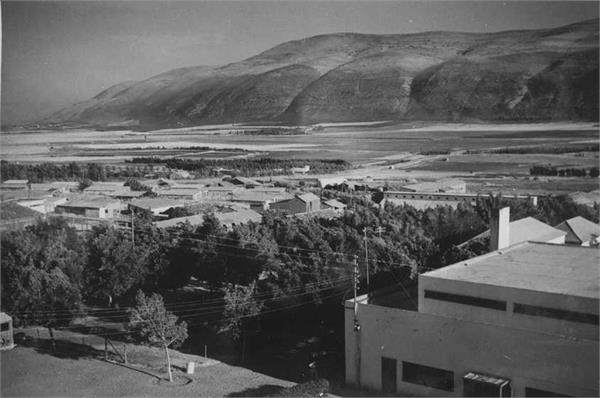
Ein Harod 1945

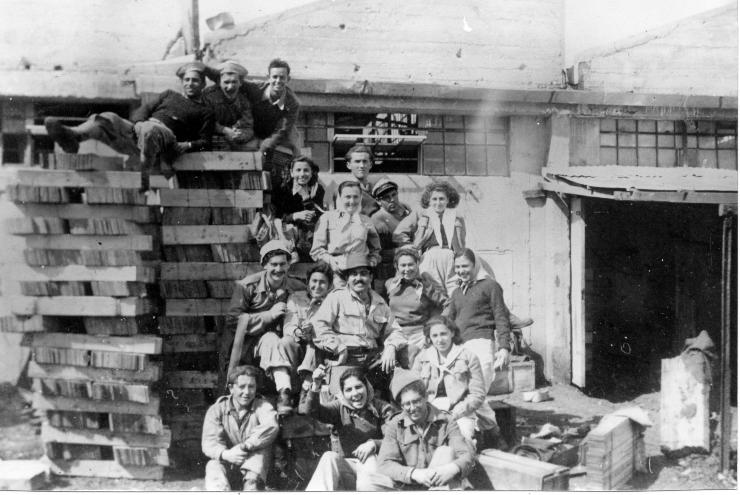
Kibbutz Ein Harod, 1949

=== Leadership of kibbutz movement ===
In 1924, the Ein Harod group was joined by members of the Havurat HaEmek group. In 1925, under the leadership of Yitzhak Tabenkin, Ein Harod became the center of countrywide kibbutz movement joined by members of Yagur, Ashdot Yaakov and Ayelet HaShahar, forming the basis of HaKibbutz HaMeuhad.

Ein Harod became the organizational headquarters of the movement. In 1926, during a breakup of the Gdud HaAvoda along ideological faultlines separating the Marxists from the more moderate leftists, Ein Harod and Tel Yosef ceased their close cooperation.

On 17 April 1926, the Jewish American violinist, Jascha Heifetz performed for the pioneers at a concert in the kibbutz.

=== Permanent location ===
In 1930, when the collective moved to a permanent location at the foot of Kumi Hill, the kibbutz had 239 members.

The village played an important role in the defence of the area during the 1936–1939 Arab revolt in Palestine, known by the Jews of the era as "the disturbances," during which it was the base of Orde Wingate's Special Night Squads. In 1945 the Haganah had a small prison there in which they detained members of the Irgun during the Season. However, on 29 June 1946, as part of Operation Agatha, the British army occupied the kibbutz by force. By 1947 it had a population of 1,120.

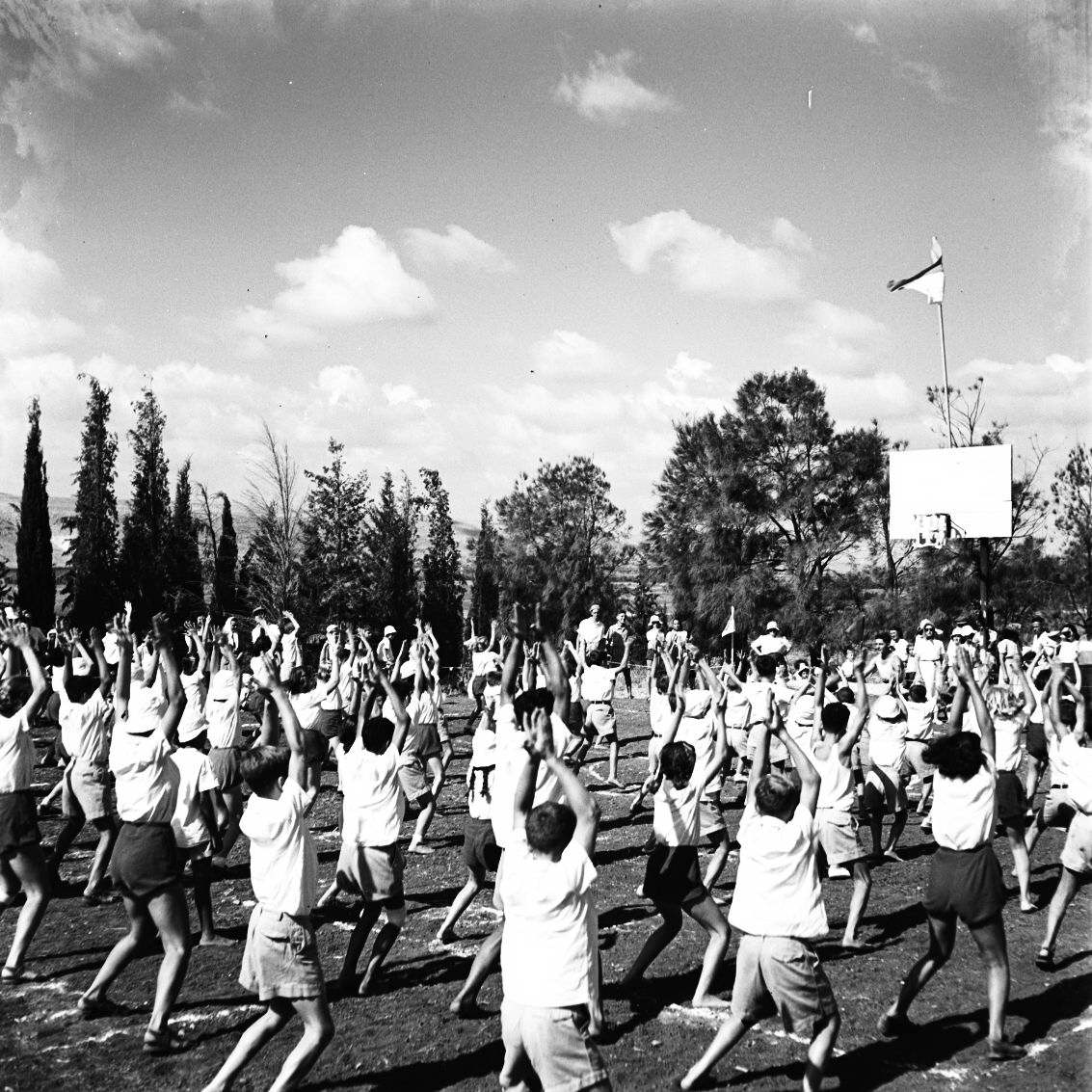
25th anniversary celebrations

In 1949, the village of Gidona was also established near to the spring for Jewish immigrants from Yemen.

== Ideological split ==
In 1952, in the wake of ideological differences between supporters of the two main socialist parties, Mapai and Mapam, the kibbutz split, creating two separate kibbutzim: Ein Harod (Ihud), affiliated with Mapai and belonging to Ihud HaKvutzot veHaKibbutzim; and Ein Harod (Meuhad), affiliated with Mapam and belonging to HaKibbutz HaMeuhad. Today both kibbutzim belong to the United Kibbutz Movement.

== Museums ==
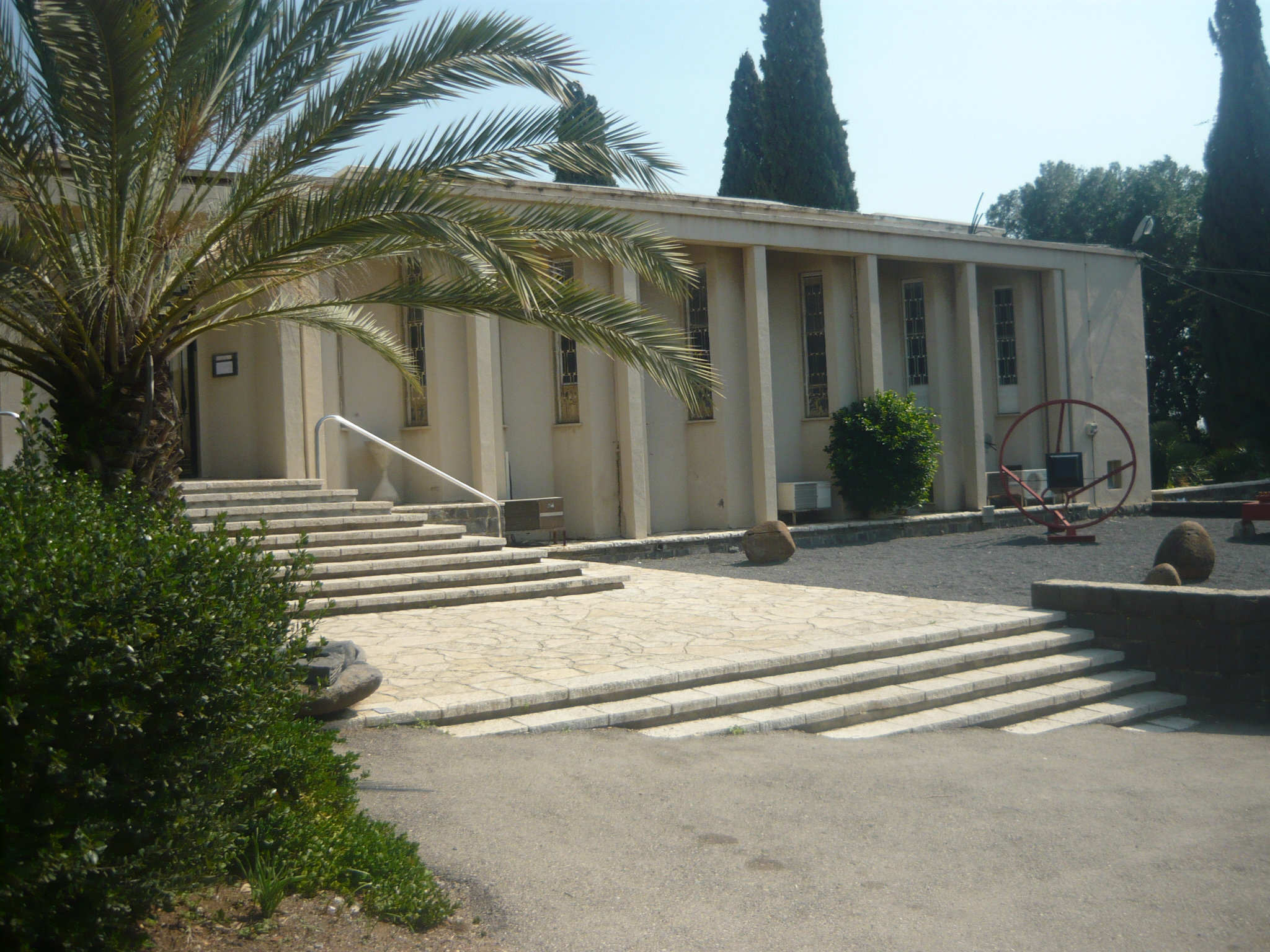
Ein Harod Art Museum, inaugurated in 1948

Mishkan Museum of Art is one of the first art museums in Israel. The museum was founded in 1937 as an "art corner" during the early years of the kibbutz in the belief that culture and art were among the essential components of a society. The artworks were initially displayed in the art studio owned by Haim Atar, a small wooden hut. A new, imposing, museum building, designed by an architect Samuel Bickels, was inaugurated in 1948. During construction of the museum, the 1952 Mapai/Mapam split happened, but the museum was preserved as the joint institution for the split kibbuzim. The museum was declared as a "heritage site" by the Council for Conservation of Heritage Sites in Israel.

Beit Shturman Museum houses a collection of archaeology and artifacts related to local history of the area.

== Notable people ==
- Yosef Alon (1929–1973), military attaché assassinated in the US
- Haim Atar (1902–1953), painter, founding member
- Meir Har-Zion (1934–2014), military commando
- Gershon Kingsley (1922 - 2019), composer and electronic music pioneer
- Dorothea Krook-Gilead (1920–1989), literary scholar, professor of English literature
- Shlomo Lavi (1882–1963), founding member; Zionist activist and politician
- Aviva Rabinovich (1927–2007), professor of botany
- Avraham Shlonsky (1900–1973), founding member; Hebrew author, translator and editor
- Yitzhak Tabenkin (1888–1971), founding member; Zionist activist and politician
- Aharon Zisling (1901–1964), signatory of the declaration of independence

== See also ==
- Israeli art
