= En Harod =

Biblical place

En Harod (Hebrew: עֵין חֲרֹד, romanized: en Charod), or the Spring of Harod, is the name for a water source in the story of Gideon in the Hebrew Bible's Book of Judges. It is the location where Gideon's forces set up their camp ahead of battling the Midianites. There is no consensus about its location, in spite of the name being used in modern Israel in connection with a spring (Ma'ayan Harod, "Harod Spring") and valley (Harod Valley) on the northern side of Mount Gilboa.

== Biblical usage ==
En Harod is mentioned in a single instance in the Hebrew Bible, in connection with a story concerning Gideon in the Judges (7:1):

Then Gideon and all the people who were with him rose early and encamped beside the spring of Harod; and the camp of Midian was north of them, by the hill of Moreh, in the valley. So he brought the people down to the water. And the number of those that lapped, putting their hands to their mouths, was three hundred men; but all the rest of the people knelt down to drink water. He retained the three hundred men, and the camp of Midian was below him in the valley.

Gideon subsequently divides these 300 men into three companies and takes them across the River Jordan to fight the Midianites.

The tale is typically presented by scholars as having been added by the Deuteronomistic editor to an original, diminutive story to explain the reduction in the number of warriors to 300 men that ultimately secured victory over a Midianite group.

Israel Finkelstein and Oded Lipschits have alternatively opined that the reduction in Gideon's forces was part of the original story "told in a fairytale-like ambiance typical of the heroic stories in Judges".

The following verses present this selection as a divine test and divine promise that Gideon will prevail over the Midianites. These verses are also viewed as the work of the Deuteronomistic editor.

=== Meaning and use of "Harod" ===
The name "Harod" in En Harod is sometimes translated literally into a descriptor, making the name the "spring of trembling (or anxiety)", which may be a toponym that the biblical narrator used "as a literary illusion to the fear and anxiety of the warriors".

The name "Harod" is also mentioned separately two other times in the Hebrew Bible as the home of Shammah the Harodite and Elika the Harodite, but "there is no connection between this town and the spring in the Gideon story".

== Possible locations ==
Several possible candidates for the location of En Harod have been suggested.

In the 19th century, Arthur Penrhyn Stanley, in his 1856 book Sinai and Palestine, tentatively associated the "Spring of Jezreel" with En Harod, and by implication with the Ain Jalut. He noted the suggestion by Rabbi Joseph Schwarz, in his 1850 Descriptive Geography of Palestine, that the name "Jalud" could be derived from the name "Gilead" reminiscing an older name for Mount Gilboa, which is referenced by Gideon ahead of his battle with the Midianites.

George Adam Smith, writing in 1920, also noted the similarity of "Jalud" with "Gilead". En Harod was associated with Ain Jalut again by the Encyclopaedia Biblica in 1903, and by George Adam Smith in 1920.

In 1882, Claude Reignier Conder alternatively identified En Harod with "Ain el-Jemain", a spring in the nearby Beit She'an valley.

In 2017, Israel Finkelstein and Oded Lipschits rejected a link between the En Harod and Ain Jalut, stating that there was "no reason to identify the Spring of Harod in Ein Jalud". They place En Harod near Shechem (modern day Nablus), in accordance with the narrations of Josephus, who also described the events as occurring near to the River Jordan in Antiquities of the Jews.

Finkelstein and Lipschits likewise assessed that the closely associated "Hill of Moreh", which had also generally been "identified in the Jezreel valley — in Jebel ed-Dahi, as indicated on modern Israeli maps", as instead resembling the name of the "Oak of Moreh" mentioned in both Genesis and Deuteronomy, which is also near Shechem.

Based on both topographical indications, Finkelstein and Lipschits identify the valley in which the story is set as being Sahl 'Askar.

== Sources ==
- Finkelstein, Israel; Lipschits, Oded (2017). "Geographical and Historical Observations on the old North Israelite Gideon tale in Judges". Zeitschrift für die alttestamentliche Wissenschaft. 129 (1): 1–18. doi:10.1515/zaw-2017-0005. S2CID 171934110.
