= Santos Casani =

British ballroom dancer (1893–1983)

- Casani in 1927
- Born: Joseph Zisling; 14 April 1893; Baranavichy, Russian Empire
- Died: 11 September 1983 (aged 90); London, England
- Other names: Joseph Goldman, John Golman
- Occupations: Military aviator; dancer; dance instructor; author
- Spouse: Joan Tilney
- Family: Aharon Zisling (brother)

Santos Casani (born Joseph Zisling; 14 April 1893 – 11 September 1983), also known as Joseph Goldman, Joseph Golman, or John Golman, was a British ballroom dancer, dance instructor, impresario, club owner and military officer. He was a prominent figure in London's ballroom dance scene during the 1920s and 1930s and is known for his role in the development and popularization of modern ballroom styles in Britain.

In 2025, interest in Casani's life was reignited after it was discovered that he had been the subject of the photograph that had been modified for the final scene of Stanley Kubrick's 1980 film, The Shining.

== Early life and emigration ==
Casani was born Joseph Zisling in Baranowitz, near Minsk in Belarus, then in the Russian Empire, to Jewish parents, Rabbi Zvi Menachem Zisling and Esther Kaplan. He had one sister and four brothers, one of whom, Aharon, eventually became a highly influential figure among the founders of the state of Israel, serving as its first Minister of Agriculture under the provisionally formed government.

In 1908 or 1909, Joseph was sent to the Transvaal Colony (modern-day South Africa) to work for an uncle, Bernard Cartoon, who owned a wine and spirits store in Krugersdorp. In 1912, he enrolled in the South West Rhodesia volunteers, apparently using the name of Joseph Goldman. In 1914, he enlisted in General Botha's Army but was discharged due to ill health in 1915. After brief service in the South African Army, he made his way to England and enlisted in the British Army, at first as Joe Goldman. He changed this to John Goldman and then joined the RAF in 1917 under the name John Golman.

== Military service in World War I ==
In the Royal Flying Corps, Golman trained as a pilot and was commissioned as a Pilot Officer. On 10 October 1919, Lt. Golman suffered severe facial injuries in a plane crash in Scotland while serving at RAF Leuchars. His wounds included burns and skull and nasal fractures. He spent over a year recovering in RAF hospitals, particularly RAF Finchley, and underwent extensive reconstructive surgery to his face, in particular having his nose largely rebuilt. He was discharged from active service in late 1920 and received a 40% medical disability pension.

== Dance career ==
Following his World War I military service, and despite his severe injuries and operations, Casani took up judo and began a new career as a professional dancer and dance instructor in London. In late 1921 he began using the name Santos Casani, which he considered more marketable for a dancer. In 1923, he partnered with dancer Jose Lennard to form a popular exhibition dance team. They became well known for their public performances, including a famous stunt in which they danced the Charleston on top of a moving London taxicab for a famous Pathé newsreel. In 1925 he made his name change official, settling on "Casani" for the remainder of his life.

Casani operated a large ballroom dance school in London (first at 43 Knightsbridge and later at 90 Regent Street) and was known for his instructional materials and public dance demonstrations. He authored two self-teaching dance books, including Casani's Self-Tutor of Ballroom Dancing (1927) and Casani's Home Teacher: Ballroom Dancing Made Easy (1936). In 1933, he opened The Casani Club on Regent Street, which became a fashionable venue for dance and social events. He was declared bankrupt in 1938 as a result of overextending himself with his club in London and his association with Firbeck Hall, Yorkshire.

== World War II and postwar years ==
During the Second World War, Casani rejoined military service, this time with the Royal Army Service Corps. At first he organised dances and recreational events in Britain and then in 1945-6 he was stationed in India and Southeast Asia, where he was responsible for organizing recreational events for British troops. He introduced a popular troupe called the "Butlin Ballet," promoting troop morale through dance. By the end of the war, he had achieved the rank of lieutenant colonel.

After the war, Casani returned to Britain and was involved in postwar rehabilitation programs. He worked briefly for Butlin's holiday camps and produced reports recommending leisure infrastructure modeled on military recreation. However, he struggled financially and declared bankruptcy a second time in late 1951.

== Personal life ==
=== Identity and citizenship ===
Casani gave inconsistent personal accounts of the date and location of his birth throughout his life. Despite his Russian-Jewish origins, he insisted he was born in Krugersdorp, South Africa, but this was denied by the South African authorities. During his application for British naturalization in the 1940s, the Home Office investigated these inconsistencies. Ultimately, he was granted citizenship in 1950, although his official documents omitted his place of birth.

=== Marriage ===
In 1951, Casani married Joan Winifred Tilney, an amputee who had lost a leg during the Blitz. They became a well-known couple in London social circles during the 50s and 60s, albeit somewhat eccentric. For example, the press reported on their pet budgerigar, Poochi, that accompanied them on many occasions.

=== Death ===
Casani died in London on 11 September 1983. Joan died six years later, on 25 May 1989.

== Photograph used in The Shining ==
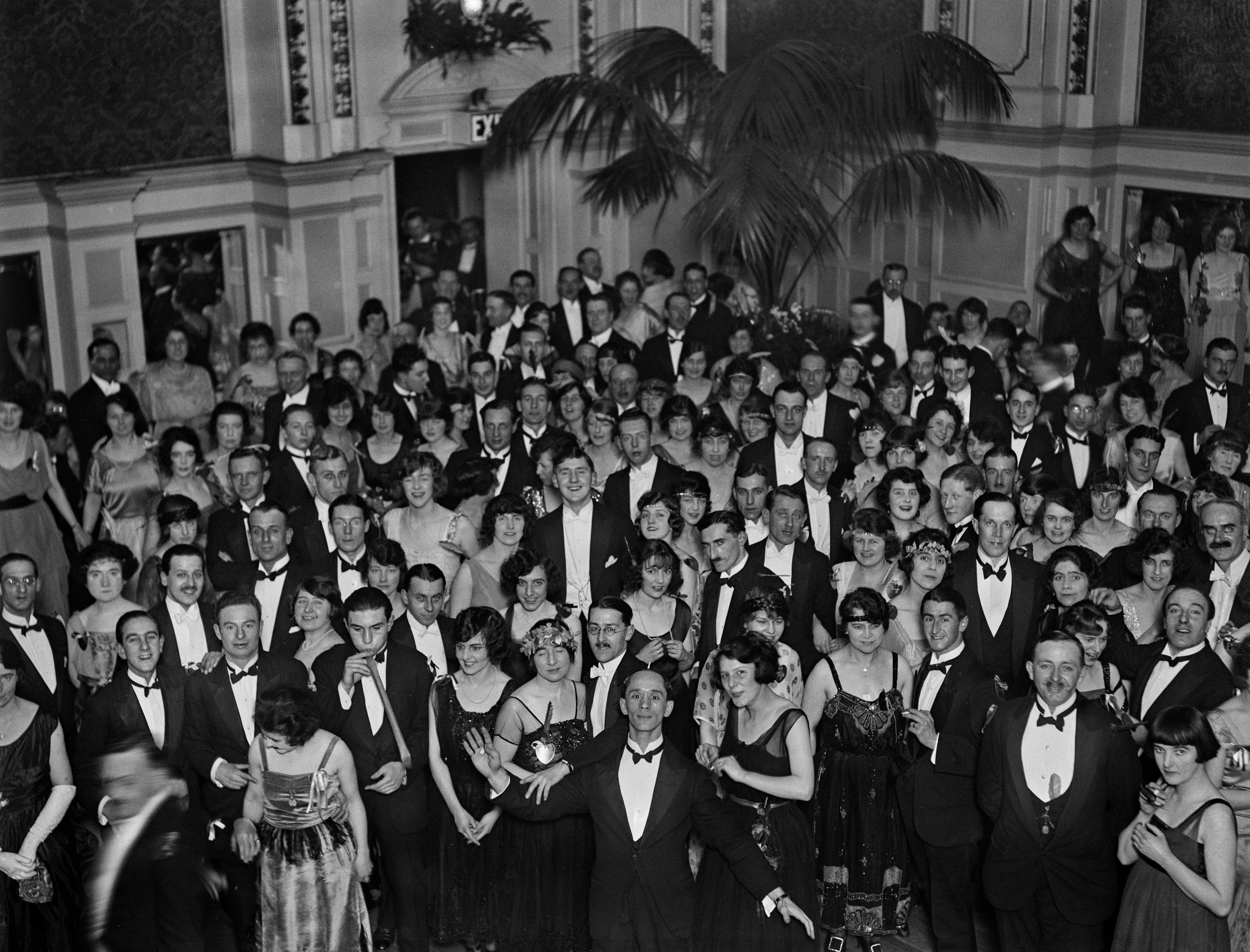
Casani waving at the camera at a St. Valentine's Day dance in 1921

In April 2025, it was announced that the longstanding mystery surrounding the provenance of the altered photograph used in the final scene of Stanley Kubrick's film, The Shining, had been solved. Retired academic Alasdair Spark used facial recognition techniques to identify the man in the original photograph as Casani and then embarked on a search to identify the location and event. Eventually he discovered that the original and three others had been taken at a 1921 St Valentine's Day Ball at the Empress Rooms, part of the Royal Palace Hotel in Kensington, London, and had been stored in Getty's Hulton Archive since 1921. For the movie, the artist and photographic retouching expert Joan Honour Smith worked on copies of the original, superimposing actor Jack Nicholson's face over Casani's and adding the caption "Overlook Hotel, July 4th Ball, 1921".
