= Harod Valley =

Valley in Israel

Harod Valley עמק חרוד
- Valley
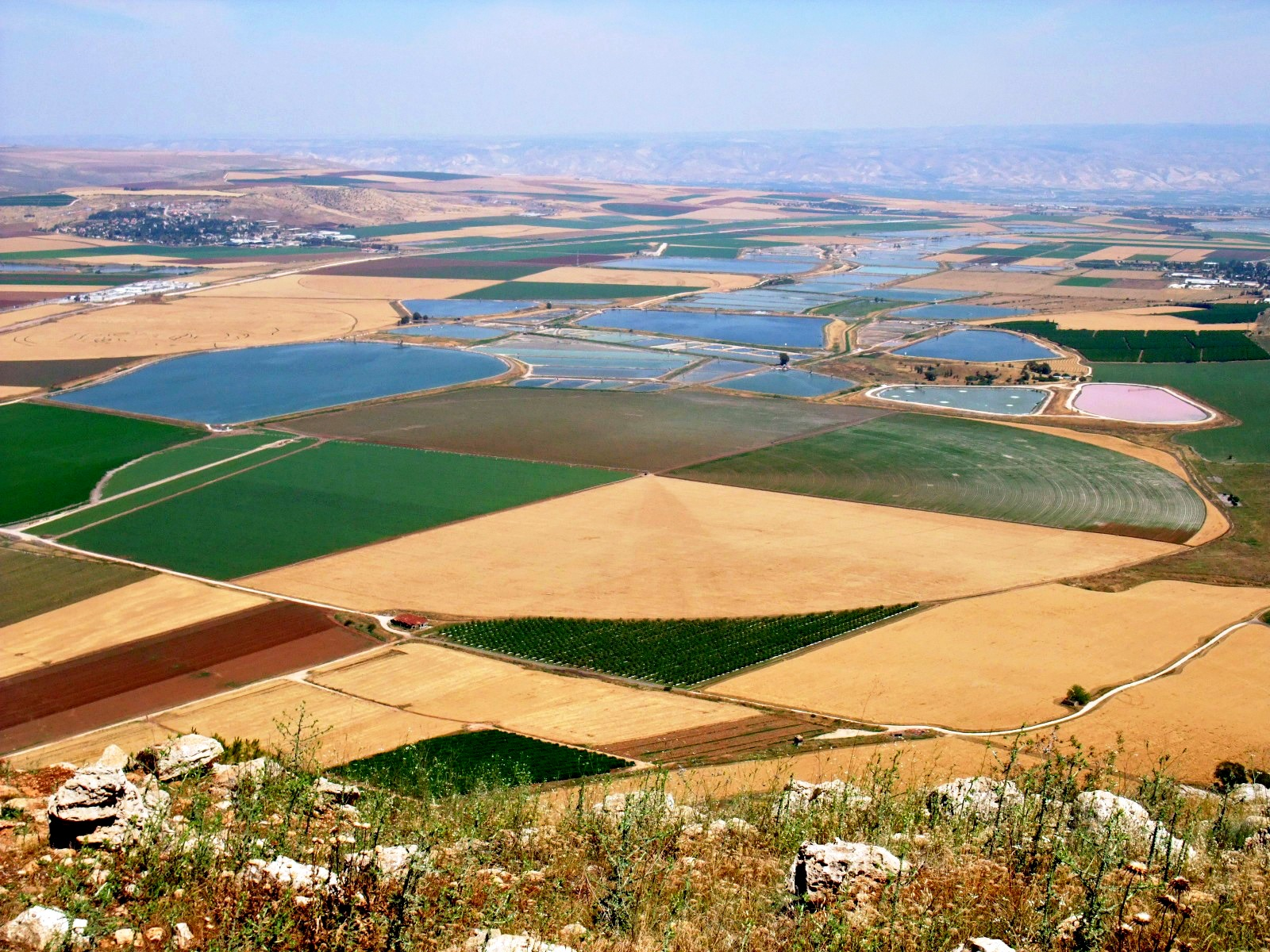

- Coordinates: 32.55°N 35.4167°E

The Harod Valley (Hebrew: עמק חרוד, romanized: Emek Harod) is a valley in the Northern District of Israel. It is the eastern part of the Jezreel Valley, a transitional zone that extends to the Beit She'an Valley. From the south it is locked by Mount Gilboa, and by the Issachar Plateau from the north. It is named after the "Spring of Harod" (Ma'ayan Harod in Modern Hebrew), called in Arabic Ein Jalut, at the edge of the valley.

== Etymology ==
For origin and meaning of historical and modern Israeli name of the name-giving spring, see Ma'ayan Harod: Names and identification.

== Hydrology, geography and geology ==
The Harod Valley is naturally separated from the western part of the Jezreel Valley by a watershed. While the Jezreel Valley is drained via the Kishon River to the Mediterranean Sea, the Harod Valley is drained through the Harod Stream ("Nahal Harod" in Hebrew, "Wadi Jalud" in Arabic), which flows from Givat HaMoreh via Beit She'an Valley into the Jordan River. Harod Spring is the largest of the springs emerging on the northern slopes of Mount Gilboa. The source of the spring as well as other springs in the Beit She'an Valley to the east, comes from fresh rainwater that percolate into the limestone hills of Samaria and collect in an underground water reservoir beneath the areas of the Palestinian cities of Nablus and Jenin. The water emerges from the hills as they incline north towards the valleys. At this valley, the waters emerge from a natural cave known as "Gideon's Cave".

The valley covers about 40 km² and is intensely cultivated. It is a corridor 18 km long and max. 5 km wide. The exact border between the Harod Valley and the Beit She'an Valley depends on the conventions. For example, according to soil and precipitation parameters, the border is the Sde Nahum - Beit Alfa line, while according to the climate, the border is marked by Kfar Yehezkel. The climate of the valley transitions from the Mediterranean climate of the western part of the Jezreel Valley to the arid dry-steppe climate of the Jordan Valley. There is a fault line between Mount Gilboa and the floor of the valley, with many spring along the line.

Until the mid-20th century the valley was swamped, similarly to the Jordan Valley. Now the swamps are drained.

== See also ==
- Ein Harod, a kibbutz
- En Harod, biblical site
- Battle of Ain Jalut (1260)

== Bibliography ==
- Julie Baretz (June 2015). "Gideon at En Harod Judges 6; 7; 8:22–28 (additional reading: 8:1–21)". The Bible on Location: Off the Beaten Path in Ancient and Modern Israel. University of Nebraska Press, Jewish Publication Society. pp. 37–51. ISBN 978-0-8276-1189-4.
