= Midia =

Scientific classification
- Kingdom: Animalia
- Phylum: Arthropoda
- Subphylum: Chelicerata
- Class: Arachnida
- Order: Araneae
- Infraorder: Araneomorphae
- Family: Linyphiidae
- Genus: Midia; Saaristo & Wunderlich, 1995
- Species: M. midas

Binomial name
- Midia midas (Simon, 1884)

Genus of spiders

Midia is a monotypic genus of dwarf spiders containing the single species, Midia midas. It was first described by Michael I. Saaristo & J. Wunderlich in 1995.
