= Ein Harod (Meuhad) =

Ein Harod (Meuhad): עֵין חֲרוֹד מְאֻחָד (Hebrew)
- Location within Jezreel Valley region of Israel Location within Israel
- Coordinates: 32°33′24″N 35°23′35″E
- Country: Israel
- District: Northern
- Subdistrict: Jezreel
- Council: Gilboa
- Affiliation: Kibbutz Movement
- Founded: 1952
- Founder: Mapam supporters
- Population (2024): 861

Ein Harod (Meuhad) (Hebrew: עֵין חֲרוֹד מְאֻחָד) is a kibbutz in northern Israel. Located in the Jezreel Valley near Mount Gilboa, it falls under the jurisdiction of Gilboa Regional Council. In 2024 it had a population of 861.

The kibbutz was the home of Yitzhak Tabenkin, one of founders of the United Kibbutz Movement, and was a symbol of the kibbutz collectivist ideology. However, in 2009 it began a process of privatization.

== Etymology ==
The kibbutz is named after the nearby biblical spring of Ein Harod, known in English as the Well of Harod. The kibbutz is close to the site of the crucial battle of Ain Jalut from the year 1260, the first major Mongol defeat in the Middle Ages (Ein Jalut being the Arabic name of the spring).

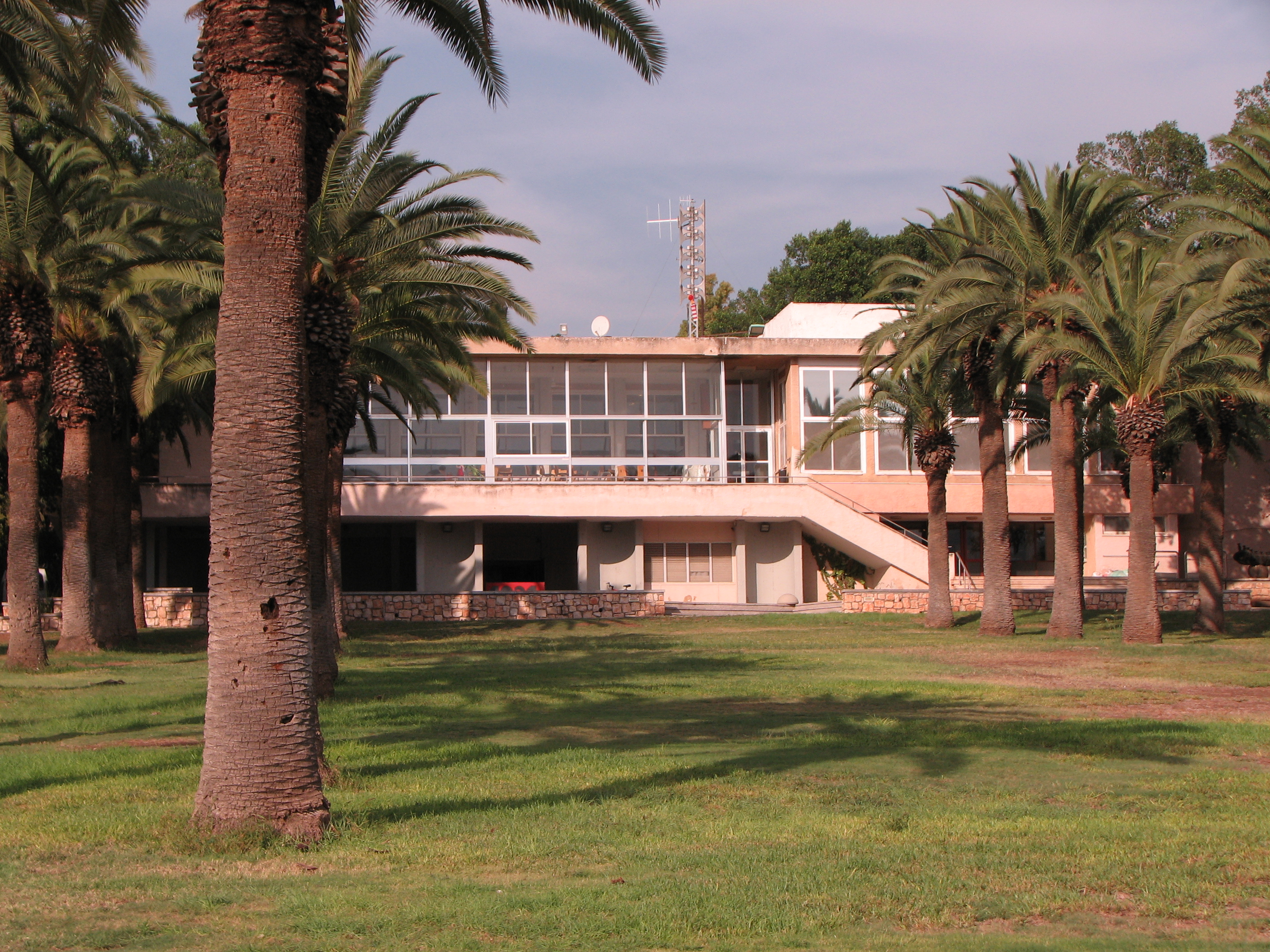
Kibbutz Ein Harod dining hall

== History ==
The first Kibbutz Movement haggadah created in Palestine was written at Kibbutz Ein Harod during the 1930s.

Kibbutz Ein Harod (Meuhad) was formed in 1952 following an ideological split in the original Kibbutz Ein Harod; Mapai supporters formed Ein Harod (Ihud), whilst Mapam supporters took the name Ein Harod (Meuhad). When the ideological rivalry between the movements subsided and the United Kibbutz Movement was established in 1981, both kibbutzim joined the united movement.

Ein Harod (Meuhad) was established on land located near the village of Tamra.

=== Privatization ===
In September 2009, the members decided to privatize the kibbutz. The kibbutz movement newsletter, Hadaf HaYarok, reported that the general assembly of the community's members, in which 335 of its 350 voting members took part, approved the decision by a majority of 79%. A special members committee was to determine the criteria for determining the differential salaries of those members who work in the kibbutz based on their contributions and the economic success of their respective enterprises. Each member's incomes was to be transferred to his or her own private account instead of the kibbutz's joint account. Members who work outside the kibbutz were to be no longer obligated to transfer their income to the cooperative, and the same was to go for retirement money, inheritances, and other kinds of financial compensation. Each member reaching pension age was to be provided with a monthly retirement compensation of NIS 2,743. Retired members were to receive an old-age allotment of NIS 1,800 from the National Insurance Institute, funds that until the privatization had been placed in a joint account. The new regulations were to take effect in early 2010. Iftah Amami, the director of the kibbutz, said from that point onward, members were to be responsible for paying with their private money for education and health costs, but the kibbutz was to continue to subsidize those services.

== Art museum ==
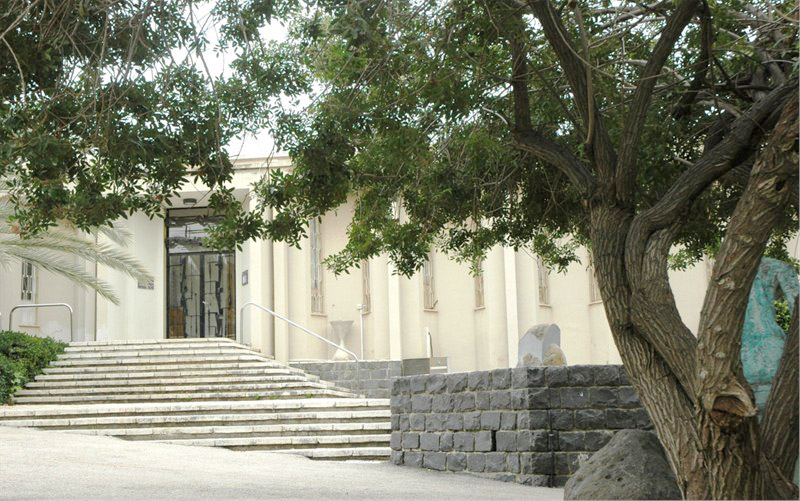
Ein Harod Art Museum, 2010

Mishkan LeOmanut, located in Ein Harod Meuhad, was the first rural museum in Israel and the first museum run by a kibbutz. One of the kibbutz members, painter Chaim Atar, organized an "art corner" in a small wooden hut which developed into a museum specializing in the work of Jewish artists from the Diaspora and Jewish folk art. Today it is one of Israel's major art institutions.

Today, Mishkan LeOmanut is the largest museum in northern Israel, with a panoramic view of the Jezreel Valley and Mount Gilboa.
