= Aharon Zisling =

Israeli politician (1901–1964)

- אהרון צִיזְלִינְג
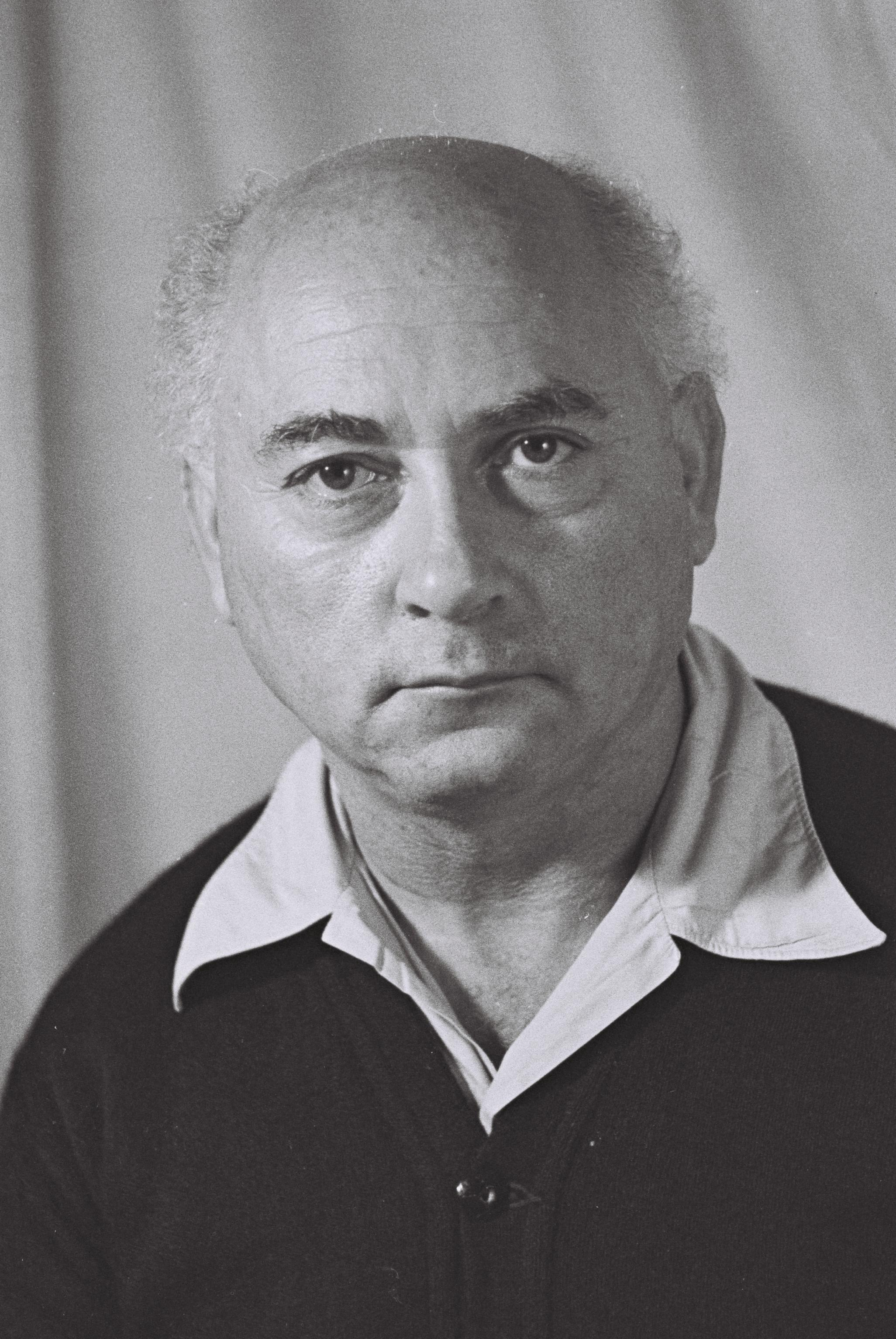

Ministerial roles
- 1948–1949: Minister of Agriculture

Faction represented in the Knesset
- 1949–1954: Mapam
- 1954–1955: Ahdut HaAvoda

Personal details
- Born: 26 February 1901 Minsk, Russian Empire
- Died: 16 January 1964 (aged 62)
- Relatives: Joseph Zisling (brother)

Aharon Zisling (Hebrew: אהרון צִיזְלִינְג), (Note: Hebrew: אהרון ציזלינג) also spelled Aharon Cizling, (26 February 1901 – 16 January 1964) was an Israeli politician and minister and a signatory of Israel's Declaration of Independence.

== Biography ==
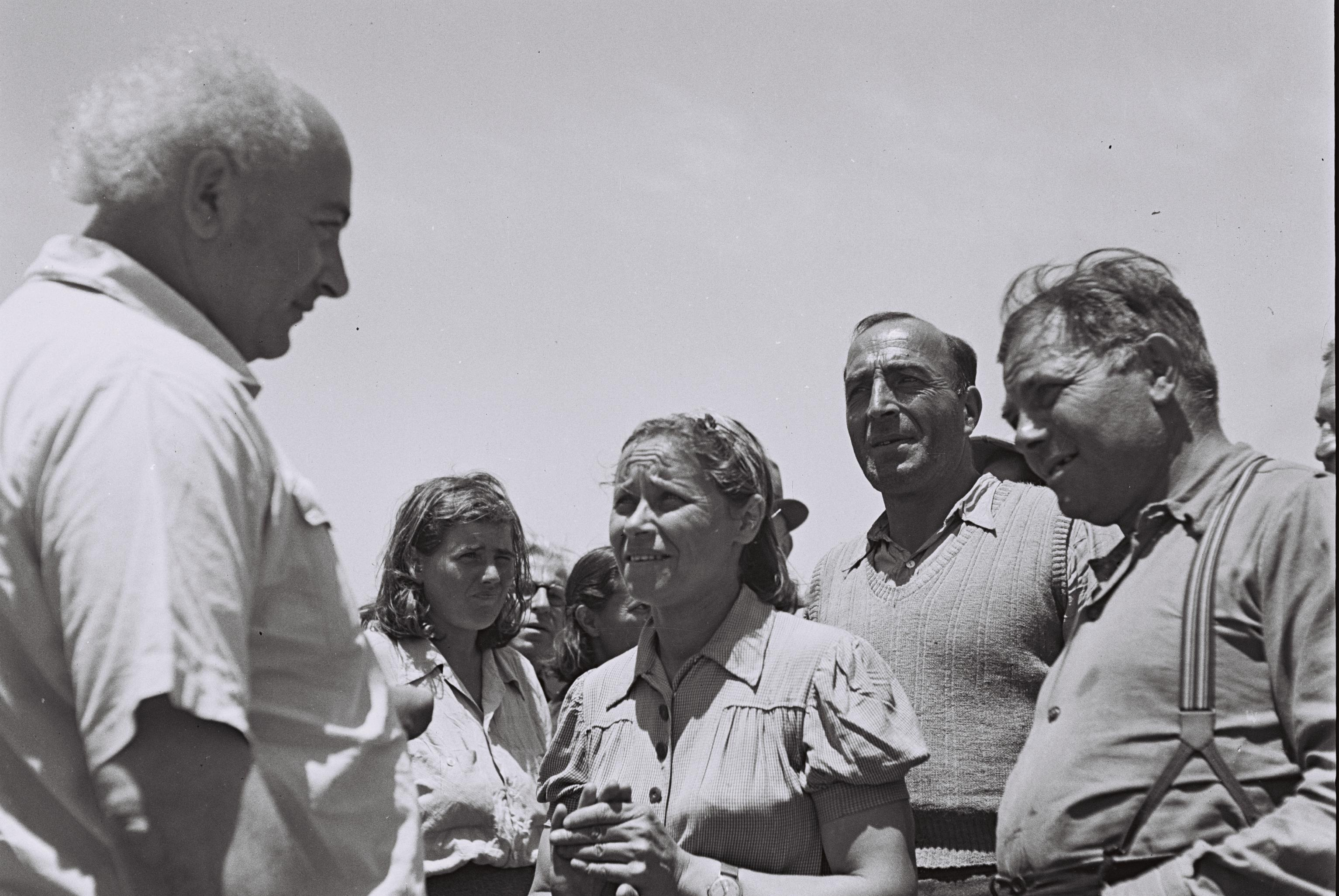
Aharon Zisling talking to newly arrived immigrants, Haifa, July 1946

Born in Minsk in the Russian Empire (now in Belarus) to Tzvi Menakhem and Esther (Kaplan) Zisling, Zisling emigrated to Palestine in 1914. He was among the founders of Youth Aliyah. As a member of the Haganah command, Zisling participated in the founding of the Palmach; he was a founder of the Ahdut HaAvoda party, a Jewish Agency delegate to the United Nations and a member of the Zionist Executive Committee.

Following Israel's Declaration of Independence in 1948, he was appointed Minister of Agriculture in David Ben-Gurion's provisional government. By then, Ahdut HaAvoda had evolved into Mapam.

However, Zisling was a noted critic of Ben-Gurion's policies towards Palestinian Arabs, in particular plans to occupy abandoned villages and to destroy standing Arab crops throughout the country after the 1948 Arab–Israeli War.

About the atrocities committed during the war, Zisling told the Provisional State Council (the forerunner to the Knesset), on 17 November 1948:

I couldn't sleep all night. I felt that things that were going on were hurting my soul, the soul of my family and all of us here (...) Now Jews too have behaved like Nazis and my entire being has been shaken.

In 1949, he was elected to the first Knesset, but Mapam were not included in Ben-Gurion's coalition and Zisling lost his place in the cabinet. He was re-elected in 1951, and was part of the faction that broke away from Mapam to recreate Ahdut HaAvoda. He lost his seat in the 1955 elections and did not return to the Knesset.

Streets in Haifa, Ashdod and Be'er Sheva are named after him.

== See also ==
- Qumya
