= Stoller =

Stoller is a surname. Notable people with the surname include:

- Alvin Stoller (1925–1992), American jazz drummer
- Bryan Michael Stoller (born 1960), award-winning independent filmmaker
- Debbie Stoller, New York Times best-selling American author, publisher and feminist pundit
- Ezra Stoller (1915–2004), American architectural photographer
- Fabian Stoller (born 1988), Swiss football midfielder
- Fred Stoller (born 1965), American stand-up comedian, actor, writer, voice artist
- Jennie Stoller (1946 – 2018), British actress
- Mike Stoller (born 1933), American songwriter and record producer of the duo Jerry Leiber and Mike Stoller
- Leo Stoller (born 1946), American self-styled intellectual property entrepreneur
- Nicholas Stoller (born 1976), English–American screenwriter and director
- Paul Stoller (born 1947), American anthropologist
- Robert Stoller (1924–1991), American psychoanalyst
- Roger W. Stoller (born 1954), American sculptor of large works integrating bronze and granite
- Sam Stoller (1915–1985), American sprinter and long jumper
- Shmuel Stoller (1898–1977), Israeli agronomist and an early member of the Zionist movement.

== See also ==
- Staller
- Stollen
- Stollers
- Stollery
- Stohler
