= Kinneret Farm =

Museum in northern Israel

Kinneret Farm: חוות כנרת (Hebrew)
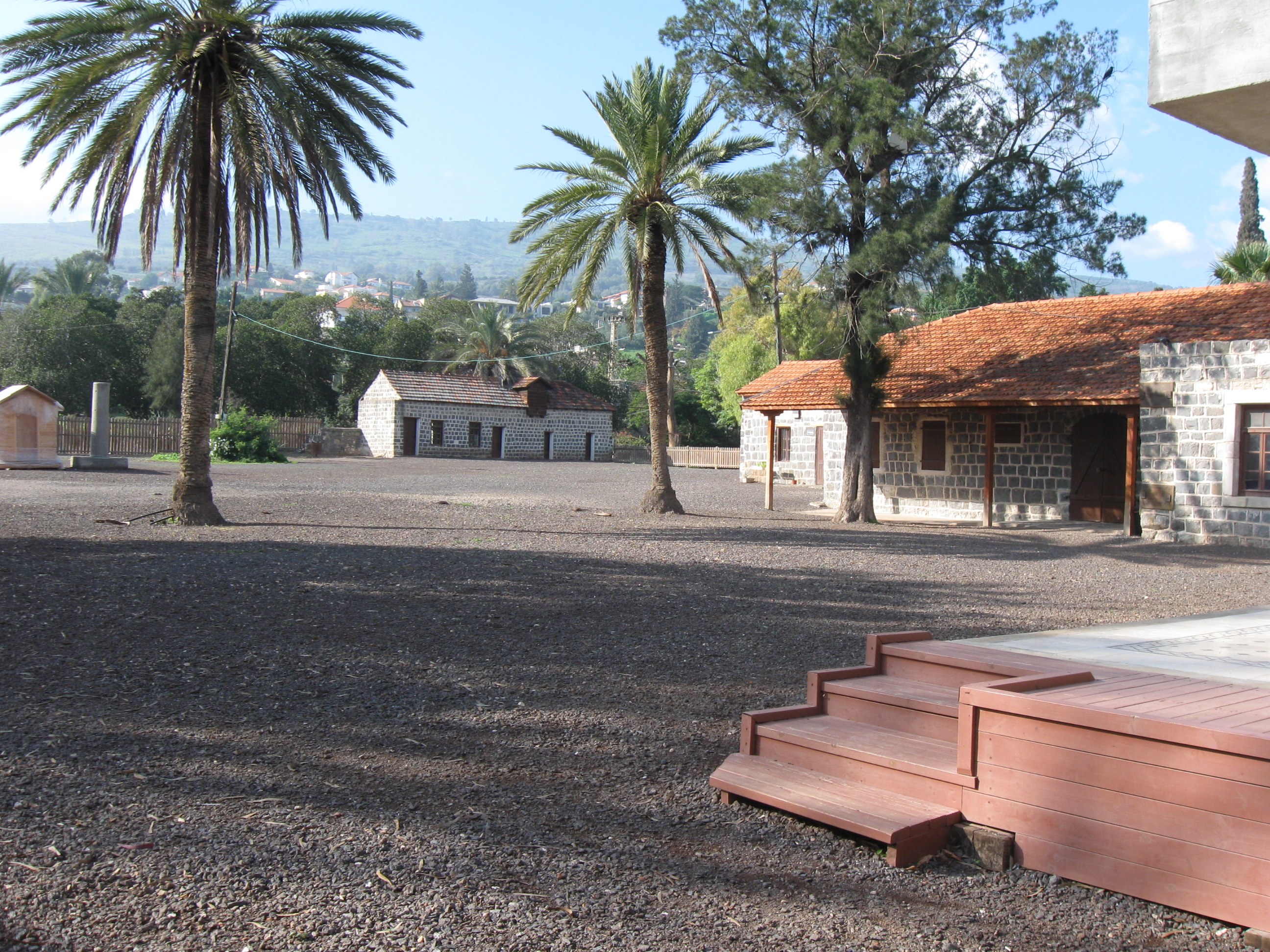

- Location within Northeast Israel
- Coordinates: 32°43′18″N 35°34′3″E
- Country: Israel
- District: Northern
- Founded: 1908
- Founder: Zionist Organisation, Arthur Ruppin

Kinneret Farm (Hebrew: חוות כנרת, romanized: Havat Kinneret) or Kinneret Courtyard (Hebrew: חצר כנרת, romanized: Hatzer Kinneret) was an experimental training farm established in 1908 in Ottoman Palestine by the Palestine Bureau of the Zionist Organization (ZO) led by Arthur Ruppin, at the same time as, and next to Moshavat Kinneret, a moshava-type village. The farm stood in close proximity to the shore of the Sea of Galilee. Until the early 1920s the farm was a hothouse and catalyst for social and economical innovation, which helped mold and create several essential institutions and infrastructure elements of the Yishuv, perpetuated in the State of Israel after 1948: communal settlement forms (kvutza, kibbutz, moshav), women's rights movement, cooperative enterprises (for supplies and financial aid, milk collection and dairy production, construction and public works), a workers' savings and support bank, public health care system, a national paramilitary organisation. From 1949 on, after the establishment of the State of Israel, the courtyard served different lesser military and civilian purposes, was abandoned, then restored as a heritage site, and in 2007 it was opened as a museum and educational centre.

== Name ==
In the Hebrew Bible, the Sea of Galilee is named Yam Kinneret, the Sea of Kinneret.

== History ==
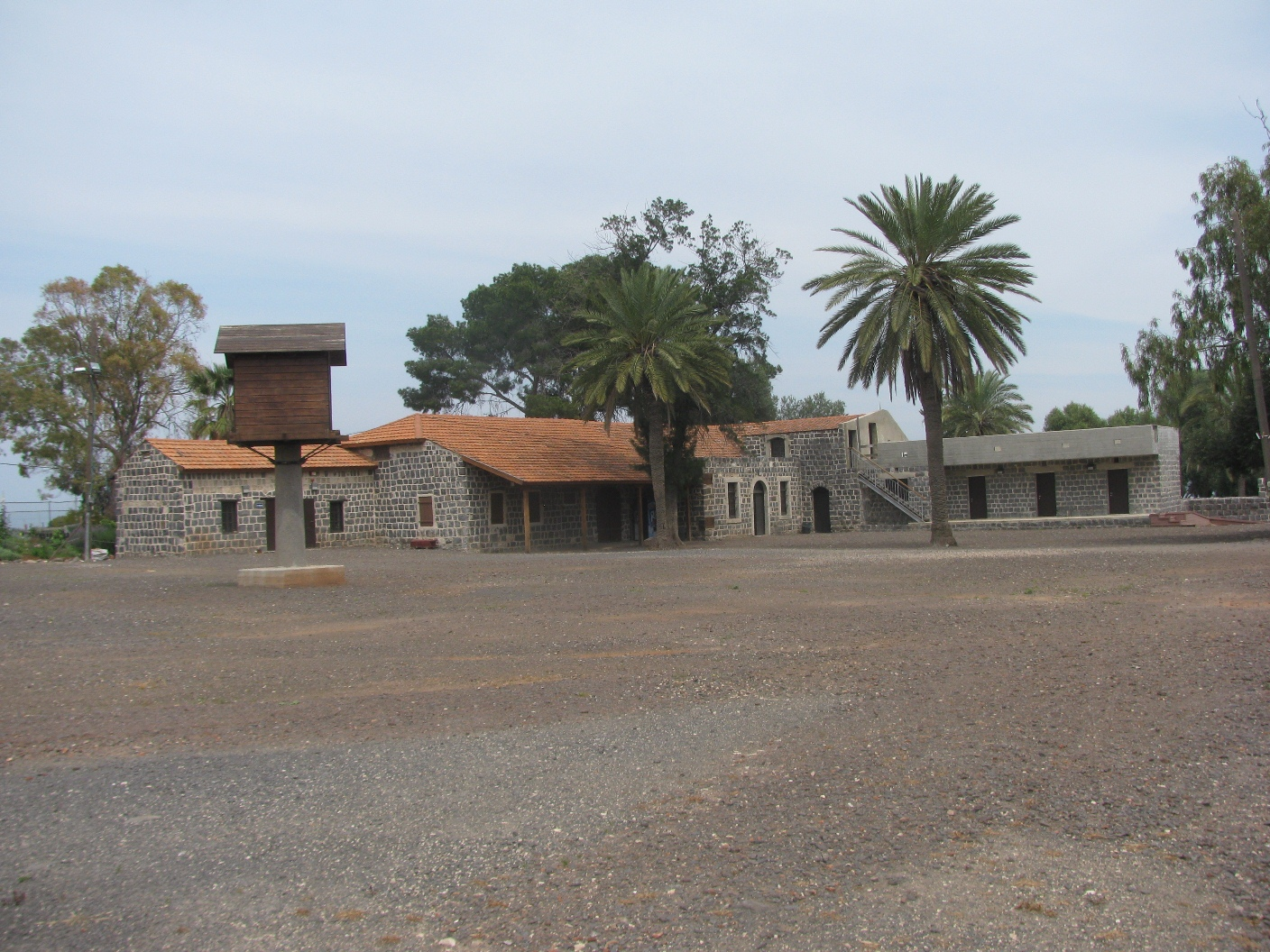
Kinneret Farm

Established in 1908, the Kinneret farm has been active for four decades in preparing Jewish Zionist farmers for settling and working the land. During this time, among other achievements, five groups from the farm have established the kibbutz settlements of Degania (1909/1910), Kinneret (1913), Afikim (1932), Ein Gev (July 1937) and Ma'agan (1949). After the establishment of the State of Israel in 1948, for the next 25 years the place was used as a military camp by Nahal's 902nd Battalion. After being abandoned for a decade and reaching an advanced state of decay, the farm's buildings and courtyard have been in a process of restoration and rehabilitation of another almost three decades.

=== Under Ottomans and Mandate (1908-1948) ===
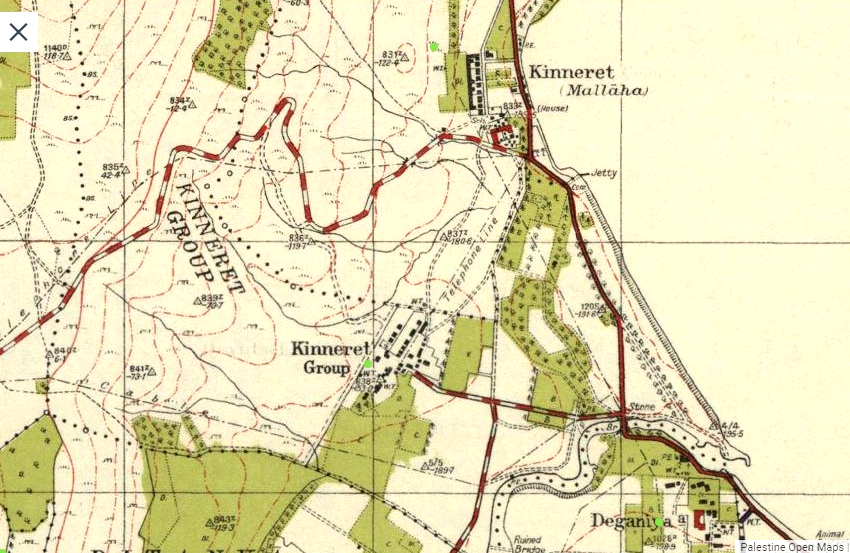
Kinneret, the moshava (parallel rows of buildings marked in black) and farm (buildings south of moshava marked in red), ca. 1941

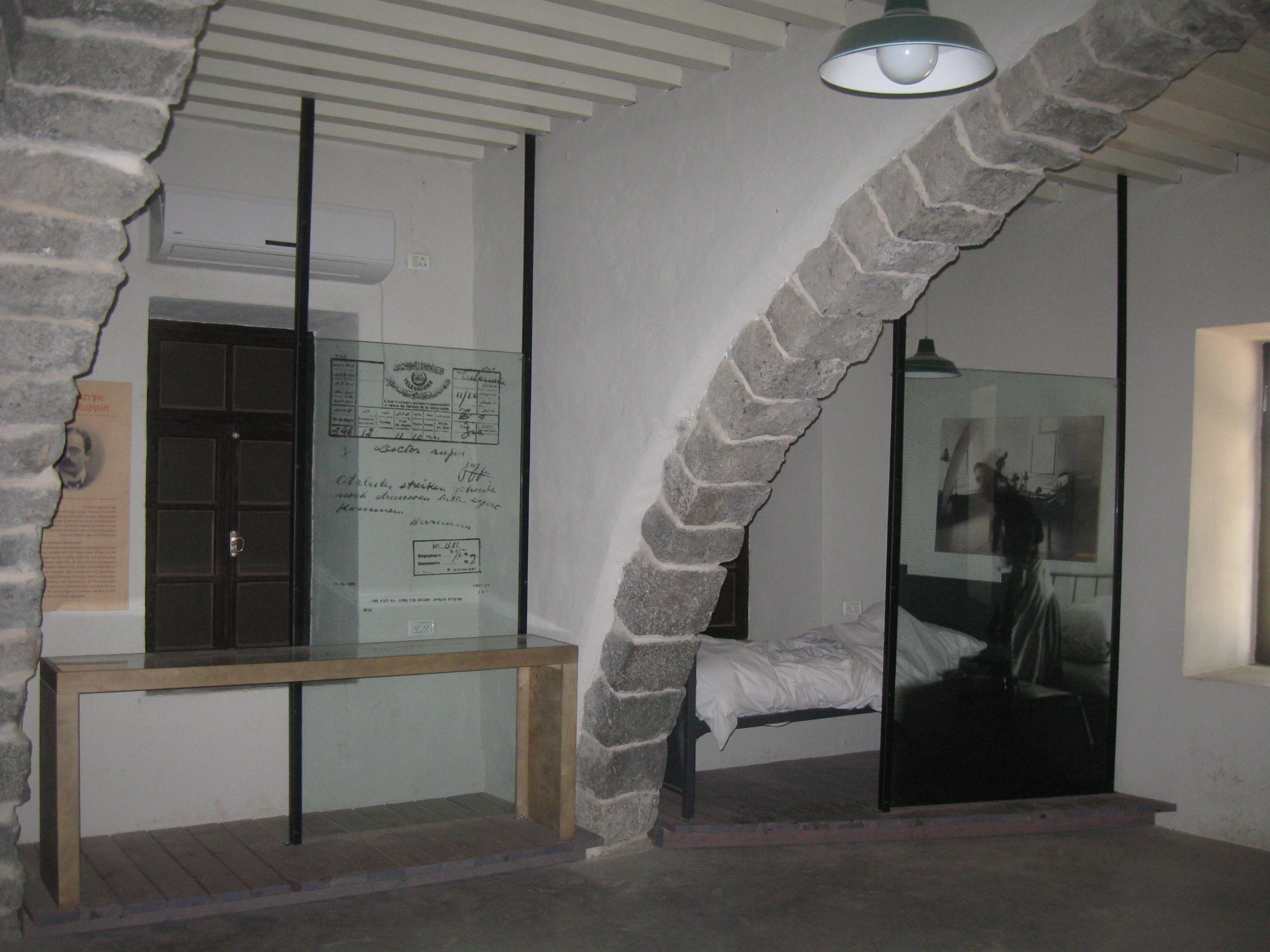
Inside the "khan" building, the isolation bed for the sick

The farm was created in June 1908 as an experiment by the Palestine Bureau of the Zionist Organisation, and although it shared infrastructure and some activities with the moshava (health, security, cultural life), it was separate and autonomous from it as it served different practical and sometimes ideological purposes.

The new Kinneret village and the farm standing at its southern extremity were built on site known in Arabic as Mallāha. Arthur Ruppin, the head of the Palestine Office of the Zionist Organisation and one of the leading Zionists of the time, was the initiator and man in charge. Unlike the moshava, the farm was meant as a training facility for agricultural work and became a laboratory for social and economic experiments, many of the structures and organisations on which pre-State Jewish and post-1948 Israeli society relied and still relies being initiated here. Such are the communal settlement forms of the kvutza, kibbutz and moshav, the women's rights movement—beginning with an agricultural training farm for women in 1911 and continuing with the first assembly of women farmers in 1914—, the cooperatives HaMashbir (for the sale of affordable food during World War I; est. 1916), Tnuva (milk and dairy products; est. 1926), and Batz construction company (est. 1921), later renamed Solel Boneh, which emerged from the Work Battalion, the Bank Hapoalim or "workers' bank", the kupat holim public health care system, and last not least the Haganah paramilitary organisation. The Farm residents also had a major role in establishing and shaping the Histadrut labor union (overview see below).

In its early years it was joined by local Jewish farmers from the surrounding villages, and very soon after by the very young pioneers of the Second Aliyah. The original Jewish settlers stayed in the so-called Khan, a word meaning caravansary, and being no more than a storage building bought from a local Bedouin tribe. The early days were marked by poverty, malaria, Bedouin attacks and ideological conflict. After a workers' strike in October 1909, Ruppin allowed the workers on the farm to split in two: the farm went on being run by a rather authoritarian agronomist, while seven pioneers were given autonomy and founded the first kvutza. They were a young group who received from the national Zionist organisations a plot of land to toil, which they managed to do more successfully than the hierarchically run Kinneret farm. They eventually settled down, naming their commune Degania. This group was part of an influential, if small wave of young Zionists who derived inspiration from Ber Borochov's Marxist-socialist ideas as much as from the mystical "religion of labour" of A.D. Gordon, a man morally influenced by ideas he had brought with him from his native Russia, the agrarianism of the Narodniks and Tolstoy's spirituality.

==== "Maidens' Farm" ====
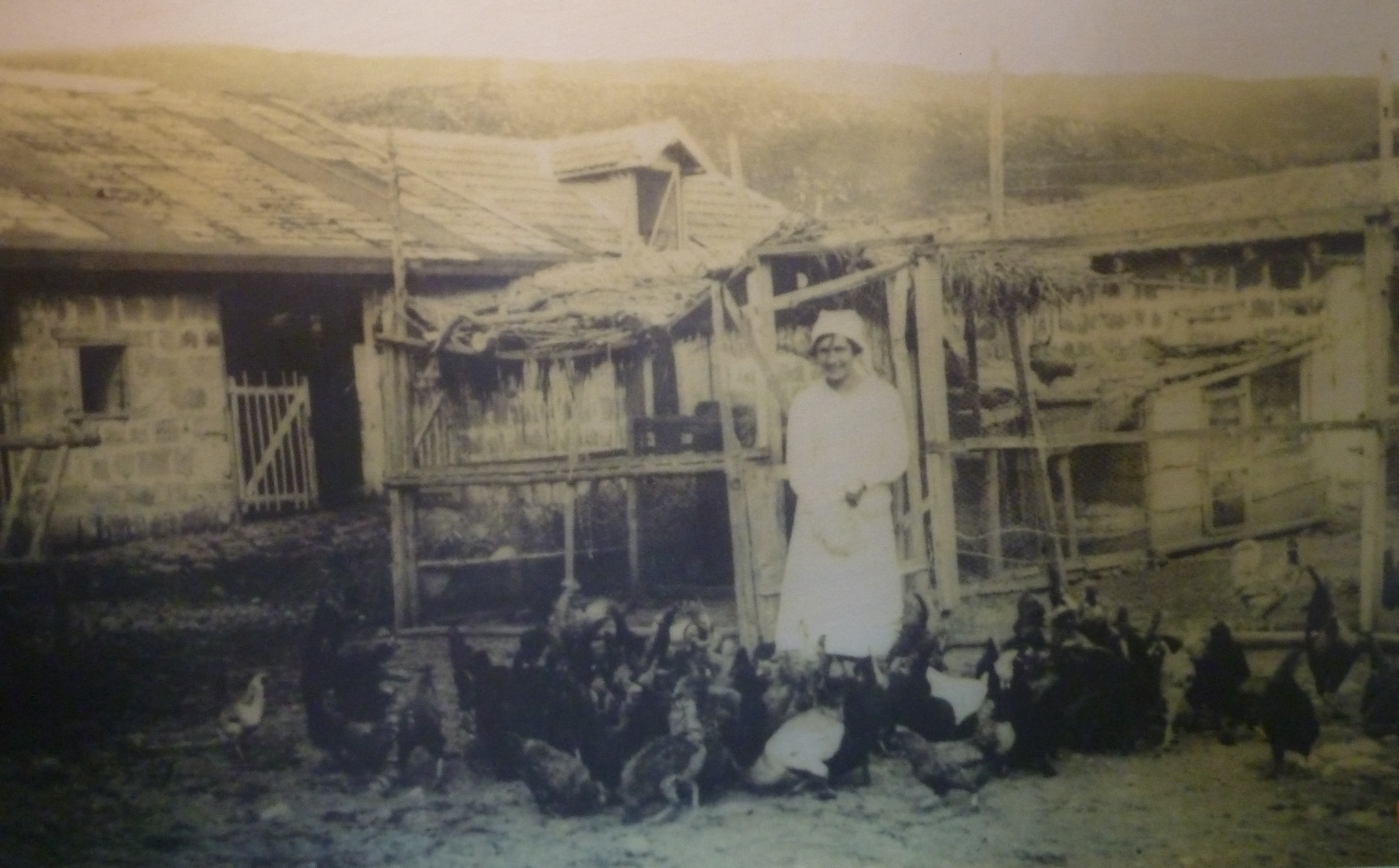
"Maidens' Farm" apprentice in the courtyard

Beit Ha'almot or Havat Ha'almot (lit. the Maidens' House or Maidens' Farm), an agricultural training farm for women, was established within the colony in 1911; it had to be closed in 1917 due to the hardships of World War I.

==== Kkvutza, kibbutz, moshav, agriculture ====
Pioneers from the Kinneret Farm founded the first kvutzot or small farming communes, Degania in 1910 and Kvutzat Kinneret in 1913, as well as the first large farming commune or kibbutz, Ein Harod, and the first communal agricultural village or moshav, Nahalal, both in 1921. One of the founders of the Kinneret Farm, Ben-Zion Israeli (1887–1984), helped reintroduce date palms to Palestine by travelling to Iraq, Iran, Kurdistan and Egypt in the 1930s where he identified suitable varieties of which he bought and adventurously brought back large quantities of saplings.

In 1919, Kvutzat Hashishim ('the Group of 60') joined the farm. Their combination of farming and contract work inspired Kinneret member Shlomo Lavi's concept of the large kibbutz.

In 1929, the Kinneret Group moved from the Farm where it had been based since 1913 to its permanent location, and the farmhouse became a temporary residence for different other groups before they too settled in their permanent localities.

==== National projects initiated at the Farm ====
Many of the initiatives had to do with the activity of Berl Katznelson.

- The kvutza type of communal settlement
  - Degania, the first kvutza, est. 1909 by pioneers trained at Kinneret Farm
- The kibbutz type of communal settlement
  - Ein Harod, the first kibbutz, est. 1921 by pioneers trained at Kinneret Farm
- The moshav type of communal settlement
  - Nahalal, the first moshav, est. 1921 by pioneers trained at Kinneret Farm
- The women's rights movement in pre-state Israel
  - Beit Ha'almot or Havat Ha'almot agricultural training farm for women, active 1911–1917 at Kinneret Farm
  - The first assembly of women farmers (1914)
- HaMashbir cooperative for the sale of affordable food during World War I, est. 1916
- Tnuva cooperative for milk and dairy products, est. 1926
- Solel Boneh construction company, est. as Batz in 1921; emerged from the Work Battalion
- Bank Hapoalim workers' bank, est. 1921
- kupat holim public health care system
- Haganah paramilitary organisation: at the 2nd assembly of the Ahdut HaAvoda party held at the Farm in June 1920, the agenda included the founding of the Haganah

The Farm residents also had a major role in establishing and shaping the labor union of pre-state Israel:

- Histadrut labor union (est. 1920)

=== After the establishment of the state ===
In 1949, the courtyard became a military camp of the IDF. From 1950 to 1974, the farm served as a base before being abandoned.

When the IDF base was dismantled in the late 1970s, the location was named a national historic site. It was declared a "national conservation site", eventually restored, and opened to visitors in 2007. It now serves as a museum and educational center.

== Notable residents ==
- Rachel Bluwstein, usually referred to simply as "Rachel", Hebrew-language poet from pre-state Israel
- A.D. Gordon (1856–1922), Zionist ideologue
- Berl Katznelson, Zionist leader
- Hana Meisel (1883–1972), Zionist agronomist and feminist
- Zalman Shazar (1889–1974), the third President of Israel (1963–1973); politician, author and poet
- Yitzhak Tabenkin (1888–1971), Zionist activist and politician, co-founder of the kibbutz movement

== Cemetery ==
Across the road from the restored Kinneret Farm, is the historic Kinneret Cemetery, use mainly by the three Kinneret entities – the moshava, the farm, and after its establishment in 1913, by the kvutza. So many pioneers and leaders of the Labour Zionist movement are buried there, that it has become the target of a kind of Israeli "civil religion", a place of secular pilgrimage. Here one can find the graves going back to 1911, among them those of Berl Katznelson, Nachman Syrkin, Rachel Bluwstein, Ber Borochov, Moses Hess, Avraham Herzfeld and Shmuel Stoller.

== Visit ==
Visitors can see the farm buildings set around a courtyard, with the dining room, barn, agricultural training farm for women, the main building improperly known as the khan, and can watch a video about the poet Rachel. Opening hours, entrance fees, contact details etc. at the Conservation Council website. The cemetery on the lake shore has received a large parking lot for visitors.

== See also ==
- Kinneret (disambiguation)
- Shulamit Lapid (b. 1934) wrote a novel about the Maidens' Farm
