= Arthur Ruppin =

German-Jewish Zionist (1876–1943)

- ארתור רופין
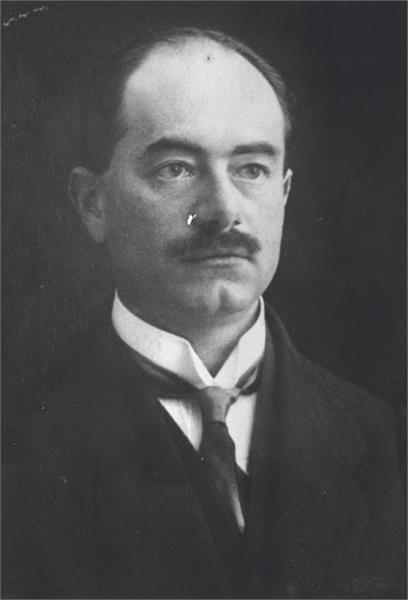
- Born: 1 March 1876; Rawicz, Province of Posen, Prussia, German Empire
- Died: 1 January 1943 (aged 66); Jerusalem, Mandatory Palestine
- Resting place: Kibbutz Degania Alef

Arthur Ruppin (Hebrew: ארתור רופין; 1 March 1876 – 1 January 1943) was a German Zionist and one of the founders of the city of Tel Aviv. Appointed director of Berlin's Bureau for Jewish Statistics (Büro für Statistik der Juden) in 1904, he moved to Palestine in 1907, and from 1908 was the director of the Palestine Office of the Zionist Organization in Jaffa, organizing Zionist immigration to Palestine. In 1926, Ruppin joined the faculty of the Hebrew University of Jerusalem and founded the Department for the Sociology of the Jews. Described posthumously as the "founder of German-Jewish demography" and "father of Israeli sociology", his best-known sociological work was The Jews in the Modern World (1934). He was also a proponent of pseudoscientific race theory.

== Biography ==
Arthur Ruppin was born in Rawicz in the German Empire (today in Poland). The family moved to Magdeburg when he was 11, and there followed a period of slow decline in the family's prosperity. At fifteen, his family's poverty forced him to leave school, where he was regarded as an extremely gifted pupil, in order to work to support them. Though he disliked commerce, he proved to be an extremely able merchant in the grain trade. Nonetheless, he was able to complete his studies in law and economics, and came second place in a prize competition established by the Krupp Steelworks concerning the uses of Social Darwinism in industry. (Note: In Ruppin's view, biological competition had ended, so that improvements were to be sought by sociological Darwinism, consisting in the adoption of methods of social engineering to enlarge and improve the horizons of man's morality and freedom (Penslar 1991, p. 86).) While at the university, Ruppin accepted the crude racial views of his age, including the idea that Jews were an inferior race, whose liabilities as a group could only be overcome by assimilation, outbreeding with Germans and Slavs. By the early 1900s, however, he began to think of himself as a Jew and take a more positive view: Jews could be regenerated not by outbreeding with Slavs and Germans, but rather by reconstituting themselves as a separate nation, as Zionism proposed. As he confided to his diary at this time, Zionism or complete assimilation: tertium non datur.

== Zionist activism ==
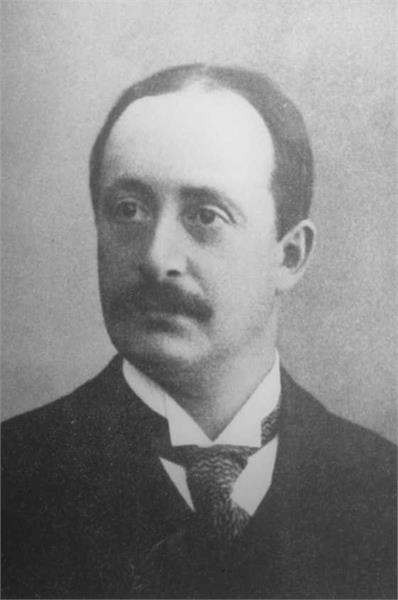
Ruppin in 1909

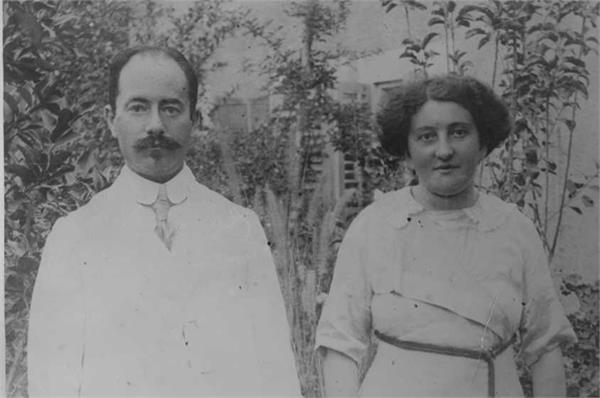
Ruppin in 1910

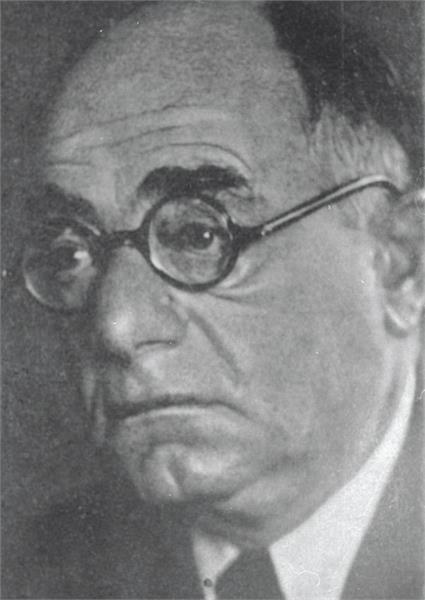
Ruppin

Ruppin joined the Zionist Organization (ZO, the future World Zionist Organization – WZO) in 1905. In 1907 he was sent by David Wolffsohn, the President of the ZO, to study the condition of the Yishuv (the Jewish community in Palestine), then in the Ottoman Empire, to investigate the possibilities for development of agriculture and industry. He reported on what he saw, which was distressing, and gave recommendations for improving the situation. In 1908 Ruppin came to live in Palestine by decision of the eighth Zionist Congress. He opened the Palestine Office of the Zionist Organization in Jaffa, with the aim of directing the settlement activities of the Zionist movement. His work made Practical Zionism possible and shaped the direction of the Second Aliya, the last wave of Jewish immigration to Palestine before World War I.

Ruppin became the chief Zionist land agent. He helped to get a loan for Ahuzat Bayit, later Tel Aviv, and acquired land on the Carmel, in Afula, in the Jezreel Valley, and in Jerusalem. Ruppin was instrumental in shaping the nature of Jewish settlement in Palestine and in changing the paradigm of settlement from those of plantation owners and poor laborers to the collective and cooperative kibbutzim and moshavim that became the backbone of the state-in-the-making. He catalyzed the commune at Sejera, and helped building the first kibbutz – Degania, as well as helping to support and organize Kinneret, Merhavia and other settlements. Later, he supported Yehoshua Hankin in his purchases of large tracts of land in the Galilee.

Ruppin was among the founders of the Brit Shalom peace movement, which supported a binational state, but left Brit Shalom after the 1929 Hebron massacre. Thereafter he was convinced that only an independent Jewish state would be possible, and he believed that the way to bring about that state was through continued settlement. He headed the Jewish Agency between 1933 and 1935, and helped to settle the large numbers of Jewish immigrants from Germany who came in that period. Ruppin exercised considerable influence in the cultural formation of East European Jews who performed aliyah and were to rise to positions of importance in later decades, such as David Ben-Gurion, Itzhak Ben-Zvi, Joseph Shprinzak, Berl Katznelson, Yitzhak Tabenkin, Zalman Shazar, and Levi Eshkol. Ruppin died in 1943. He was buried in Degania Alef.

Ruppin Academic Center is named after Arthur Ruppin.

== Race theory ==
In terms of historic origins, Ruppin believed that early Jews were a non-Semitic agricultural people, living in the Land of Israel up to the destruction of the First Temple. Thereafter they began to intermarry with the surrounding Semitic peoples and thereby compromised and weakened their racial purity. It was the infusion of "Semitic blood", he held, that "seduced" Jews from working land and, instead, led them to concentrate on commerce, a transformation which, he thought, accounted for the later 'greed' prejudice attributed to Jews.

Ruppin considered assimilation as the worst threat to the existence of Jews as people, and argued for a concentration of Jews in a common area, to be realized by the settlement of Palestine, where they would be protected from the assimilationist tendencies in Europe, as he explained in his book The Jews of the Present" (Die Juden der Gegenwart in German), especially in its second, largely-amended, edition. Ruppin accepted the idea of a division of humankind into three important races of humans, the "white", "yellow" and "black" and considered Jews to be part of the "white" race (page 213–214), and within this "race", which Ruppin divides in "Xantrochroe" (light colored) and "Melanochroe" (dark colored), to be part of the latter, actually mixture from the Arab and North African peoples and other West and South Asian peoples. Ruppin believed that realization of Zionism required "racial purity" of Jews and was influenced by works of antisemitic thinkers, including some Nazis. (Note: Segev 2009 Haaretz "In part, his views were inspired by the works of anti-Semitic thinkers, including some of the original Nazi ideologists.") Ruppin personally met Heinrich Himmler's mentor, Hans F. K. Günther, one of many racist thinkers who greatly influenced Nazism.

Specifically regarding Jews, Ruppin distinguished between "Racial Jews" and "Jewish types", and drew up a concept that divided Jews into "white, black and yellow" metaracial categories. His variables, later to prove influential in Israel, were worked out over a classification between Ashkenazim, Sephardim, Babylonians, and "special types" who did not fit into the former categories, namely such as Yemenites and Bukharans. He performed skull measurements and believed Ashkenazi Jews, whom he regarded as superior to, for example, Yemeni Jews, themselves comprised various racial subclasses, according to nasal structure. Despite these variations in their respective historic communities, Ruppin was convinced that Jews were distinguished by a special biological uniqueness.

Ruppin wrote that Jewish race should be "purified", and he stated that "only the racially pure come to the land." After becoming head of the Palestine Office of the Zionist Executive (later the Jewish Agency for Israel), he argued against immigration of Ethiopian Jews because of their lack of "blood connection" and that Yemenite Jews should be limited to menial labor. After the Holocaust, historiography in Israel usually minimized or ignored altogether this aspect of Ruppin's life.

According to Raphael Falk, Ruppin was convinced that Jews and Arabs comprised an alliance forged by common cultural and blood ties.
