= Moshavat Kinneret =

Moshava in northern Israel

Kinneret: כִּנֶּרֶת (Hebrew)
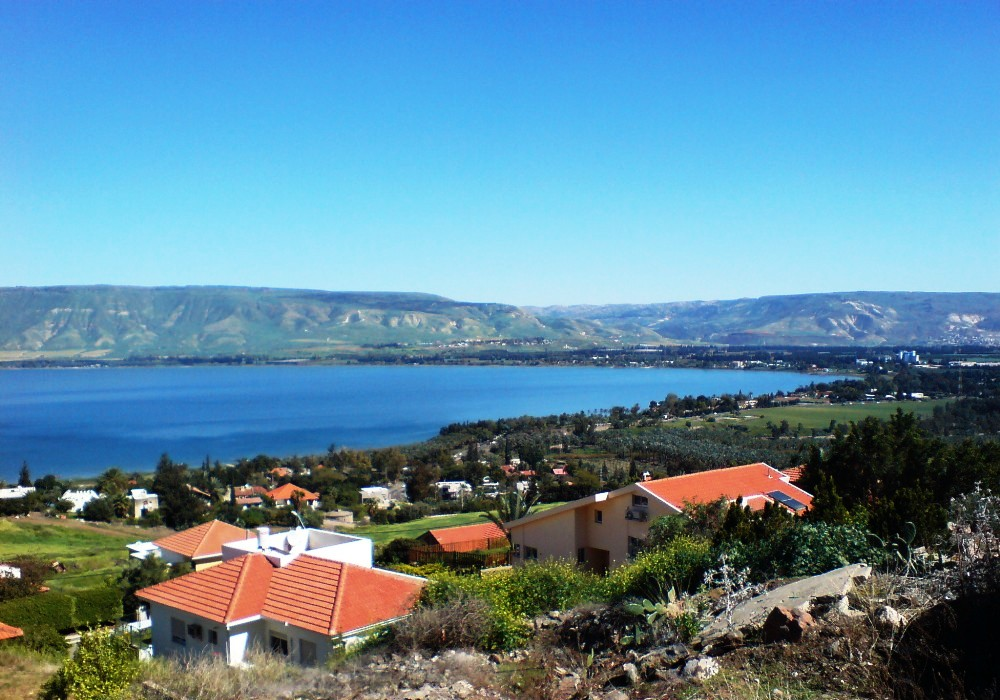

- Location within Northeast Israel Location within Israel
- Coordinates: 32°43′21″N 35°33′51″E
- Country: Israel
- District: Northern
- Subdistrict: Kinneret
- Council: Emek HaYarden
- Founded: 1908
- Founder: Baron Edmond de Rothschild and the JCA; settled by local Jewish farmers
- Population (2024): 670

Kinneret (Hebrew: כִּנֶּרֶת), also known as Moshavat Kinneret to distinguish it from the neighbouring settlement of Kvutzat Kinneret (which is organised as a kibbutz), is a moshava on the southwestern shore of the Sea of Galilee in Israel. Located in the north of the Jordan Valley, 6 kilometers south of Tiberias, it falls under the jurisdiction of Emek HaYarden Regional Council. The village sits at around 185 meters below sea level, and in 2024 it had a population of 670. Kinneret Farm, an experimental training farm, was founded at the same time as the moshava and adjacent to it, as a separate and autonomous project.

== Name ==
The name of Moshavat Kinneret derives from an ancient Canaanite town, which was however located close to the other, northern end of the lake's western shore. According to the Hebrew Bible, the town of Kinneret fell into the allotment of the tribe of Naphtali (Joshua 19:35), while the area of modern Moshavat Kinneret was probably also part of Naphtali, or (depending on interpretation) of Issachar or Zebulun. In the Hebrew Bible the Sea of Galilee was named Yam Kinneret, lit. the Sea of Kinneret, another reason for the name chosen for the moshava. The nearby ancient town of Bet Yerah was not inhabited during the time of the kingdoms of Israel and is thus not mentioned in the Hebrew Bible, its main relevance to the moshava being that it gave its name to the local high school, which is attended by children from the entire area, not just Moshavat Kinneret. The Roman-era site known as Tarichaea is said to have been in the vicinity.

== History ==
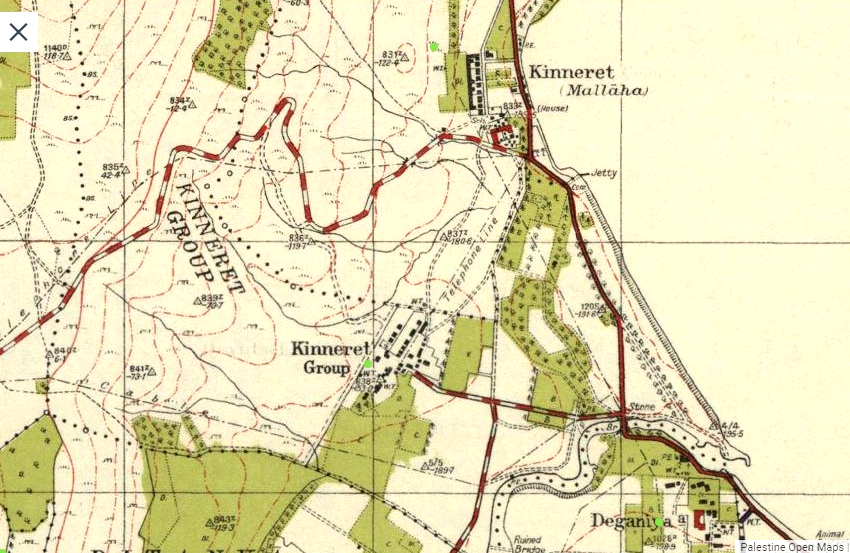
Kinneret, the moshava (parallel rows of buildings marked in black) and farm (buildings south of moshava marked in red), ca. 1941

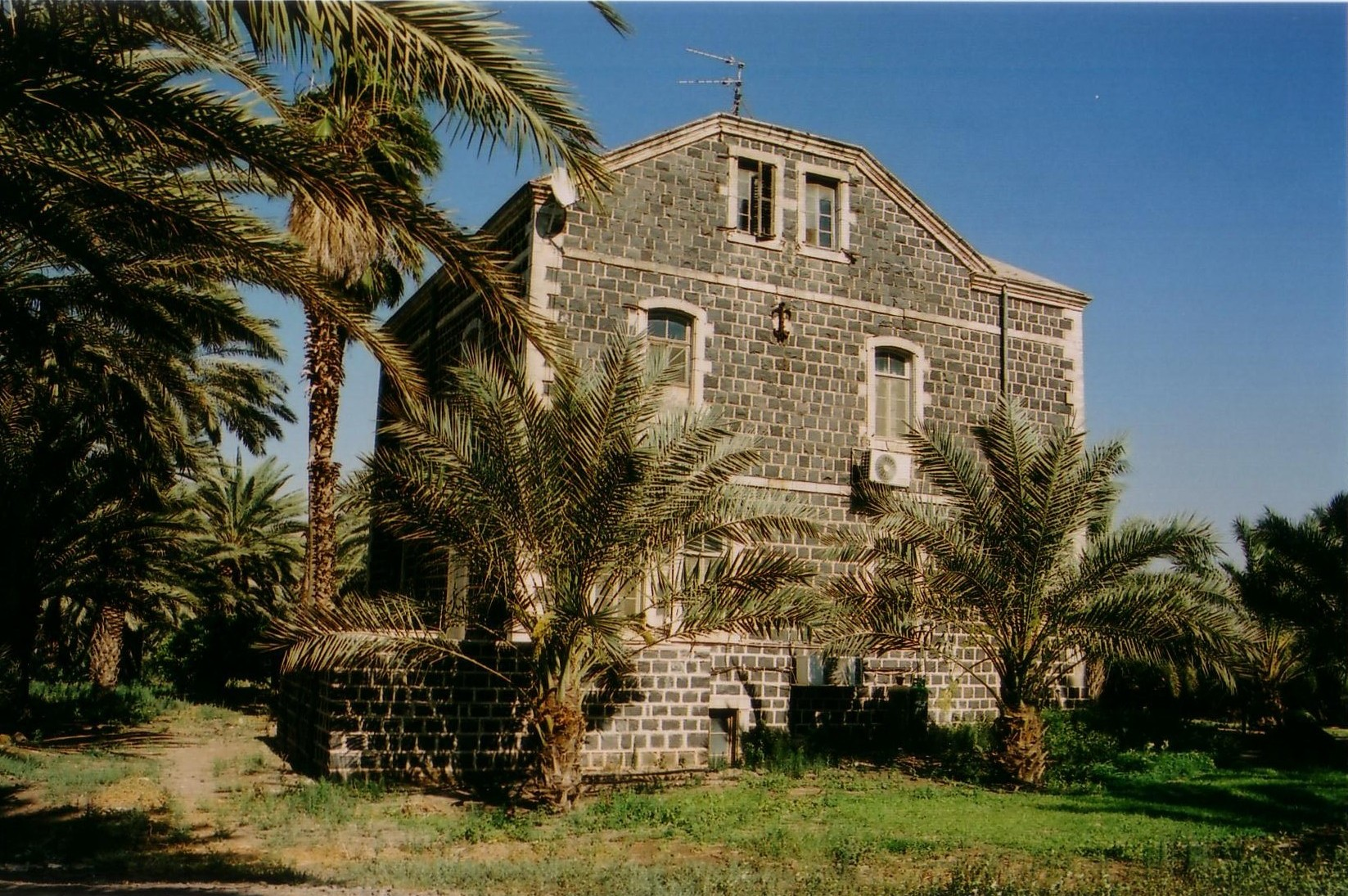
Historic building (the house of Joseph Treidel)

=== Establishment in 1908 ===
Two entities were established at this location: the village or "moshava", and a training farm known as Kinneret Farm or Kinneret Courtyard. The village was part of the settlement project of Baron Edmond de Rothschild and the Jewish Colonisation Association, while the Kinneret Farm was the initiative of the Palestine Bureau of the Zionist Organisation. The village and the farm shared infrastructure (health, security, cultural life), but served different purposes. The village was established as a frame for families willing to settle the land and start their own business.

=== After the establishment of the state ===
After Israeli independence the village became a local council with an area of 7,000 dunams. However, as part of a local government reorganisation in 2003, it came under the control of Emek HaYarden Regional Council.

== Museums ==
The moshav operates a history museum in a building that housed the first local hospital.

The restored nearby Kinneret Farm also functions as a museum and educational center. The museum presents life at the Farm, personalities that lived there and national projects emanating from their work.

The restored "Motor House", the first mechanised pumping station, is set among orchards and eucalyptus groves and faces Yardenit from across the Kvutzat Kinneret access road. It can also be visited.

== Notable residents ==
- Yitzhak Tabenkin (1888–1971) – founding member; Zionist activist and politician, co-founder of the kibbutz movement. His son Moshe Tabenkin (Hebrew article here; 1917-1979) – poet, educator and soldier – was born in the moshava.

== Cemetery ==
To the east of the village, across the road from the restored Kinneret Farm, is the historic Kinneret Cemetery. It has been used mainly by the three "Kinnerets" – the moshava, the farm, and from 1913 on by the kvutza. A great many pioneers and leaders of the Labour Zionist movement are buried there, making it into a secular pilgrimage site, a focus of Israeli "civil religion". Among those buried here are Berl Katznelson, Nachman Syrkin, Rachel Bluwstein, Ber Borochov, Moses Hess, Avraham Herzfeld and Shmuel Stoller. The first grave was dug in 1911 for Menahem "Mamashi" Shmueli (Shmulevich).

== See also ==
- Tarichaea, ancient city, either north (Magdala) or south of Tiberias (Kh. Kerak area, near the moshava)
- Berl Katznelson (1887–1944), Zionist leader
- Rachel Bluwstein (1890–1931), or simply "Rachel", Hebrew-language poet from pre-state Israel
