= Beit Berl =

Institutional settlement in central Israel

Beit Berl: בֵּית בֶּרְל (Hebrew)
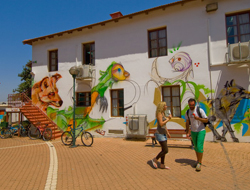
- Midrasha LeOmanut, Beit Berl School of Arts

- Location within Central Israel Location within Israel
- Coordinates: 32°11′59.24″N 34°55′33.74″E
- Country: Israel
- District: Central
- Subdistrict: Petah Tikva
- Council: Drom HaSharon
- Founded: 1946
- Population (2024): 254

Beit Berl (Hebrew: בֵּית בֶּרְל, lit. 'Berl House') is an institutional settlement in Israel. Located on the outskirts of Kfar Saba, the village falls under the jurisdiction of Drom HaSharon Regional Council and is the location of Beit Berl College, which has around 7,000 students. In 2024 it had a permanent population of 254.

== History ==
Before the 20th century the area formed part of the Forest of Sharon. It was an open woodland dominated by Mount Tabor Oak, which extended from Kfar Yona in the north to Ra'anana in the south. The local Arab inhabitants traditionally used the area for pasture, firewood and intermittent cultivation. The intensification of settlement and agriculture in the coastal plain during the 19th century led to deforestation and subsequent environmental degradation.

Beit Berl was named after Berl Katznelson, the spiritual leader of the Labor movement in Mandate Palestine. The cornerstone was laid on 21 August 1946. It was used as an area base for the Haganah forces, and later by the Israel Defense Forces. It was built on the site of the Qalmaniya estate founded by Moshe Gredinger, a British businessman, who visited Palestine in April 1926. In 1927, he purchased land for the establishment of a large plantation north of Kfar Saba. He named the estate for his father, Kalman Gredinger. The farm, which grew citrus and then established a dairy barn, was not successful. In 1945, Gredinger wrote to Avraham Harzfeld, a founder of the Histadrut Labor Federation in Palestine, who proposed establishing a training institute there commemorating Berl Katznelson.

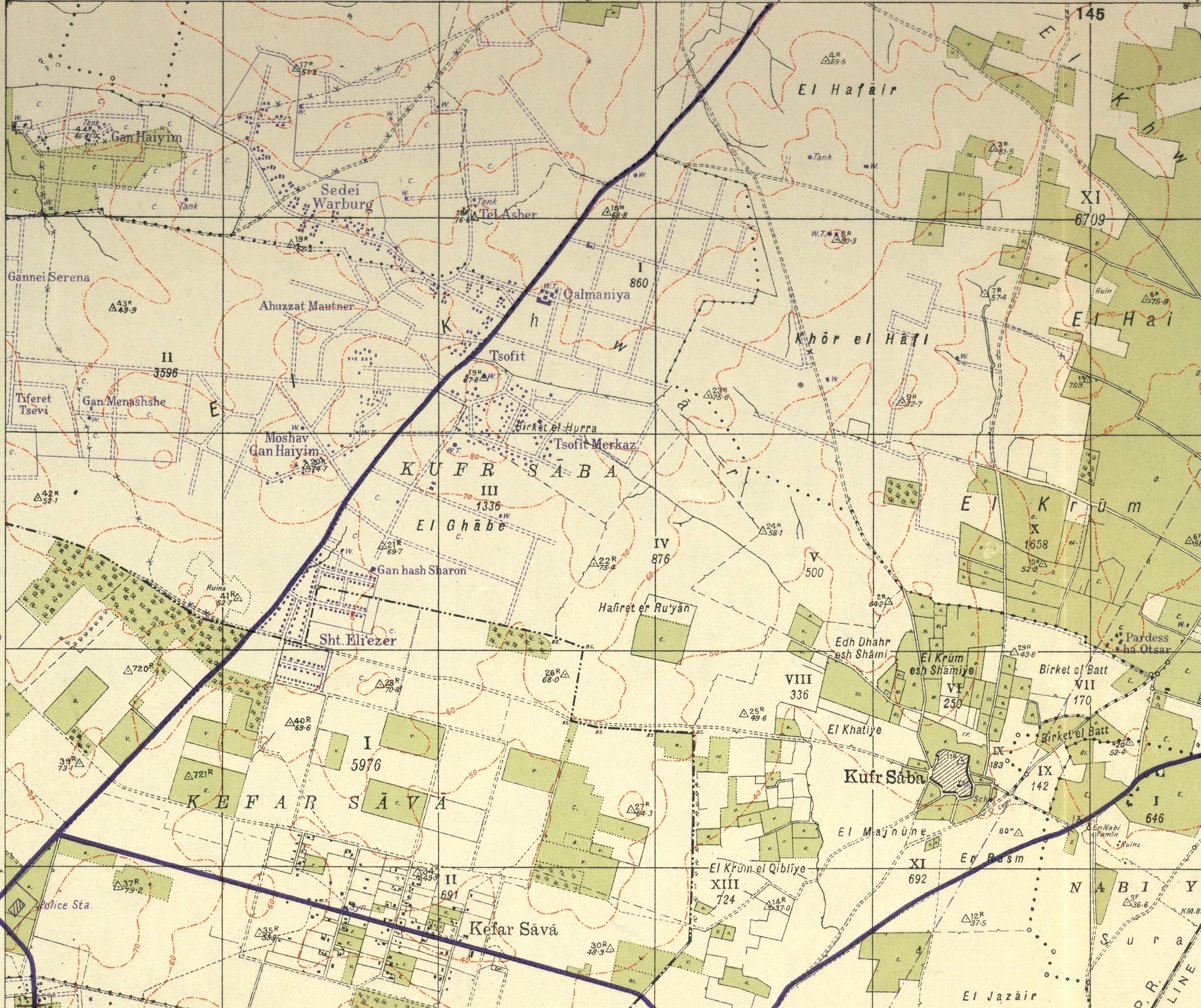
Beit Berl (Qalmaniya) 1942 1:20,000

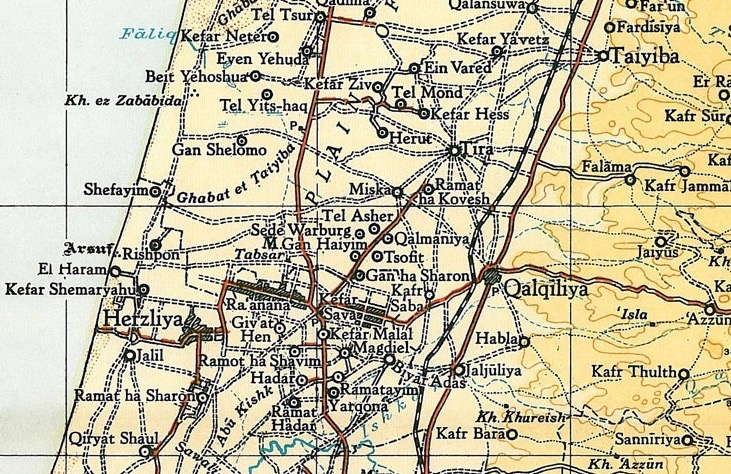
Beit Berl (Qalmaniya) 1945 1:250,000
