= Shulamit Lapid =

Israeli novelist and playwright (born 1934)

- שולמית לפיד
- Born: Shulamit Giladi; 9 November 1934 (age 91); Tel Aviv, Mandatory Palestine
- Citizenship: Israeli
- Education: Hebrew University of Jerusalem
- Spouse: Tommy Lapid (m. 1959; died 2008)
- Children: 3, including Yair
- Writing career
- Genres: novels, plays

Shulamit Lapid (née Giladi, Hebrew: שולמית לפיד; born 9 November 1934) is an Israeli novelist and playwright.

== Biography ==
Lapid was born in Tel Aviv. She majored in Oriental studies at the Hebrew University of Jerusalem. Her father, David Giladi (born in Transylvania, Austria-Hungary), was a journalist, novelist, and translator, as well as one of the founders of the Israeli newspaper Maariv. In Lapid's book Veulai Lo Hayu she documents the story of her father's immigration to Israel, his integration into Israeli society, and her own childhood in Tel Aviv during the 1930s and 1940s. Lapid is the widow of Yosef Lapid, a journalist, politician and public figure. They had three children: Daughters Michal (who was killed in a car accident in 1984) and Merav, and son Yair – a well-known Israeli politician, novelist, journalist and television personality, formerly Prime Minister of Israel.

== Literary career ==
Her first collection of stories, Dagim ("Fish"), was published in 1969. She writes historical novels, realistic prose addressing social issues and ethnic discrimination, and several detective novels.Gai Oni (1982) is the story of the Galilean village that became Rosh Pina. Lapid was one of the first Hebrew writers to address the role of women in the Zionist narrative. Lapid's second novel, Ka-Ḥeres ha-Nishbar ("As a Broken Vessel," 1984,) is the story of an antiquities dealer, Moses Wilhelm Shapira. Havat Haalamot (The Maidens' Farm) follows the protagonists of Gai Oni during the second Aliyah, who were part of a project to train women in farming in the Kinneret Farm near the Sea of Galilee.

Lapid wrote several children's books, and also the words for the song "Rosa Marzipan", which was composed by Shlomo Gronich.

Lapid's spy-themed literature is especially popular in Israel. She is the creator of the character Lizzy Badihi, who is featured in six of Lapid's thriller novels. Badihi is a journalist of a Beersheba local newspaper called "HaZman Darom" (literally "The Southern Times"), and in each book she stubbornly insists on dealing with a detective mystery no one asked her to solve. The first book in this series, "Mekomon" (published 1989), helped to popularize the genre in Israel. Badihi solves several cases while "tottering in her oversized shoes and wearing oversized earrings."

Plays written by Lapid: HaYerusha (The Inheritance), Abandoned Property, Mifal Hayav (His Life Work), and A Surrogate's Womb.

Lapid was chairperson of the Hebrew Writers' Association.

== Awards and recognition ==
In 1987, Lapid won the Prime Minister's Prize for Literature. In 1996 she won the Newman Prize. In 2013 she won a Steimatzky Prize for her book Abandoned Furniture. She also won the Book Publishers Association’s Gold and Platinum Prizes for Nunia.

== Books ==
=== Children's books ===
- Schpitz (Masda 1971)
- Oded Hameluhlah (Keter 1988)
- Hasmiha Zehaba (Keter 1988)

=== Novels ===
- 1982 – Gai Oni (Valley of Strength) – Keter
- 1984 – Ke-heres Ha-nishbar (As a Broken Vessel) – Keter
- 1998 – Etsel Babu (Chez Babou) – Keter
- 2000 – Pilegesh ba-Midbar (Concubine on the Hill) – Keter
- 2002 – Hibuk Dov (Bear Hug) – Bavel
- 2006 – Havat Ha-Alamot (Hebrew: The Maidens' Farm; English: Nunia) – Keter
- 2011 – Veulai Lo Hayu (Maybe They Were Not) – Keter
- 2012 – Ta'ut Enosh (Human Error) – Keter

=== Stories ===
- Shalvat Shotim (Masda 1974)
- Mazal Dagim (Eked 1969)
- Kadahat (Yahdav 1979)
- Halomot Shel Aherim (Keter 2014)

=== Lizzy Badihi series ===
- Mekomon (Keter 1989)
- Pityon (Keter 1991)
- Hatakhshit (Keter 1992)
- Hol Ba-einayim (Keter 1997)
- Pilegesh Bagiv'a (Keter 2000)
- Sof Onat Halimonim (Keter 2007)

== Plays ==
- Abandoned Property directed by Aharon Almog, costumes by Eli Sinai, music by Misha Balhrovic, staged at the Cameri Theater in March 1987, at Habima Theater in 2006, directed by Itzik Weingarten, and conducted currently at Nozar Theater.
- A Surrogate's Womb directed by Ilan Ronen, scenery and costume work by Rut Dar, music by Dan Hendelsmann, staged at the Cameri Theater in April 1990.
- Mifal Hayav directed by Ori Pester, scenery and costume work by Dudu Mazah, music by Ori Vidislavsky, staged at the Cameri Theater in March 1992.
- Haflagot directed by Amit Gazit, scenery and costume work by Tal Yitzhaki, music by Eldad Lidor, staged at the Cameri Theater in January 1997.

== See also ==
- Women of Israel
- Literature of Israel
