= Stohler =

Stohler is a surname. Notable people with the surname include:

- Heather Stohler (1979–2008), American model
- Jörg Stohler (born 1949), Swiss footballer

== See also ==
- Stoller, a similar surname
- Stotler
