= Sdei Avraham =

Moshav in southern Israel

Sdei Avraham: שְׂדֵי אַבְרָהָם (Hebrew)
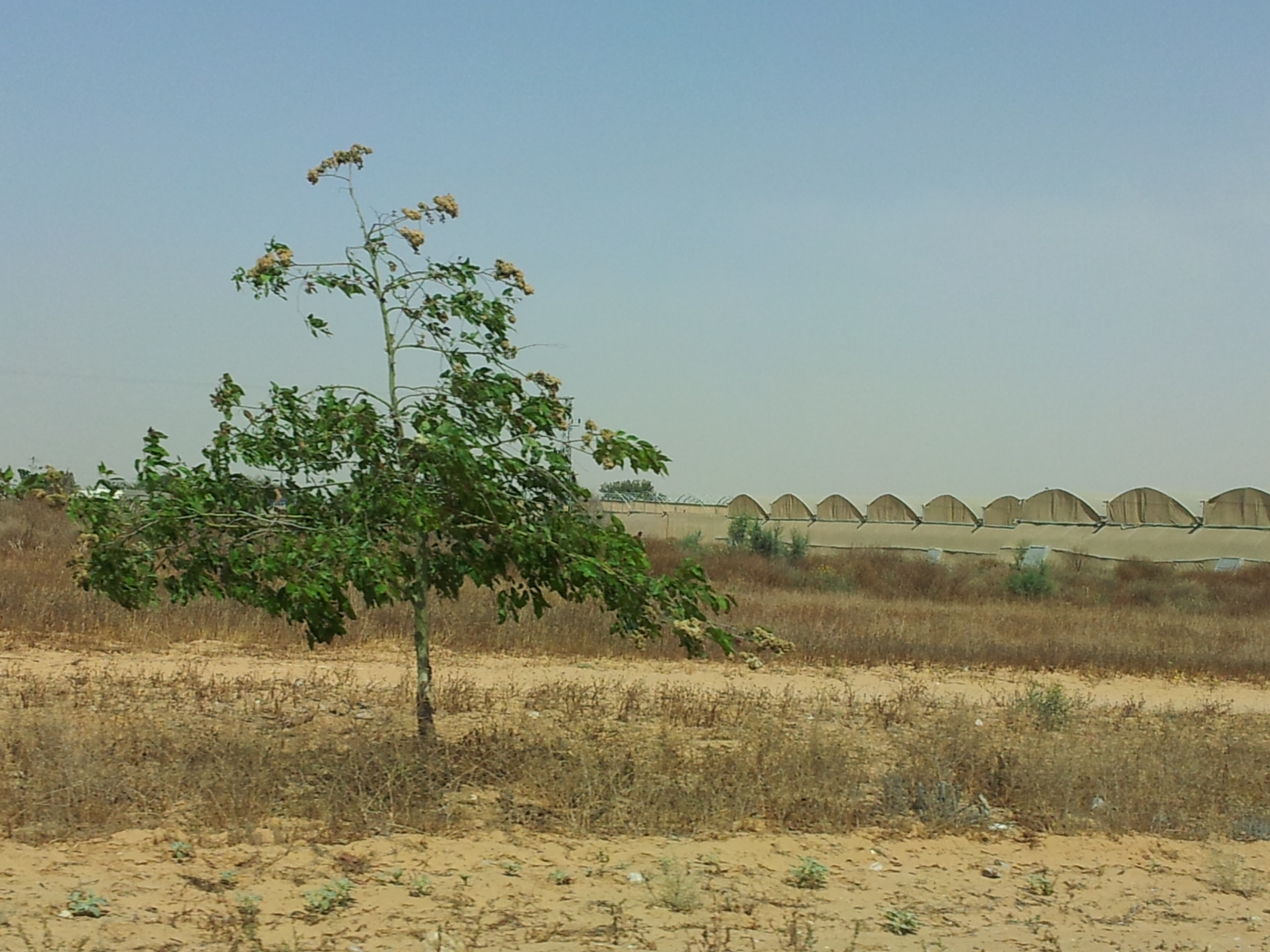

- Location within Northwest Negev region of Israel Location within Israel
- Coordinates: 31°12′46″N 34°20′11″E
- Country: Israel
- District: Southern
- Subdistrict: Beersheba
- Council: Eshkol
- Affiliation: Moshavim Movement
- Founded: 1981
- Founder: South American Jews.
- Population (2024): 447

Sdei Avraham (Hebrew: שְׂדֵי אַבְרָהָם, lit. 'Avraham Fields') is a moshav in southern Israel. Located in the Hevel Shalom area of the north-western Negev desert near the Gaza Strip border, it falls under the jurisdiction of Eshkol Regional Council. In 2024 it had a population of 447.

== History ==
The moshav was founded in 1981 and was initially named Yesodot HaDarom (Hebrew: יְסוֹדוֹת הַדָּרוֹם, lit. Foundations of the South), but was later renamed after Avraham Herzfeld, a leader of Mapai.
