= Strathmore (Maryland) =

Arts center in North Bethesda, Maryland, US

Coordinates: 39°1′54″N 77°6′11″W

The Music Center at Strathmore
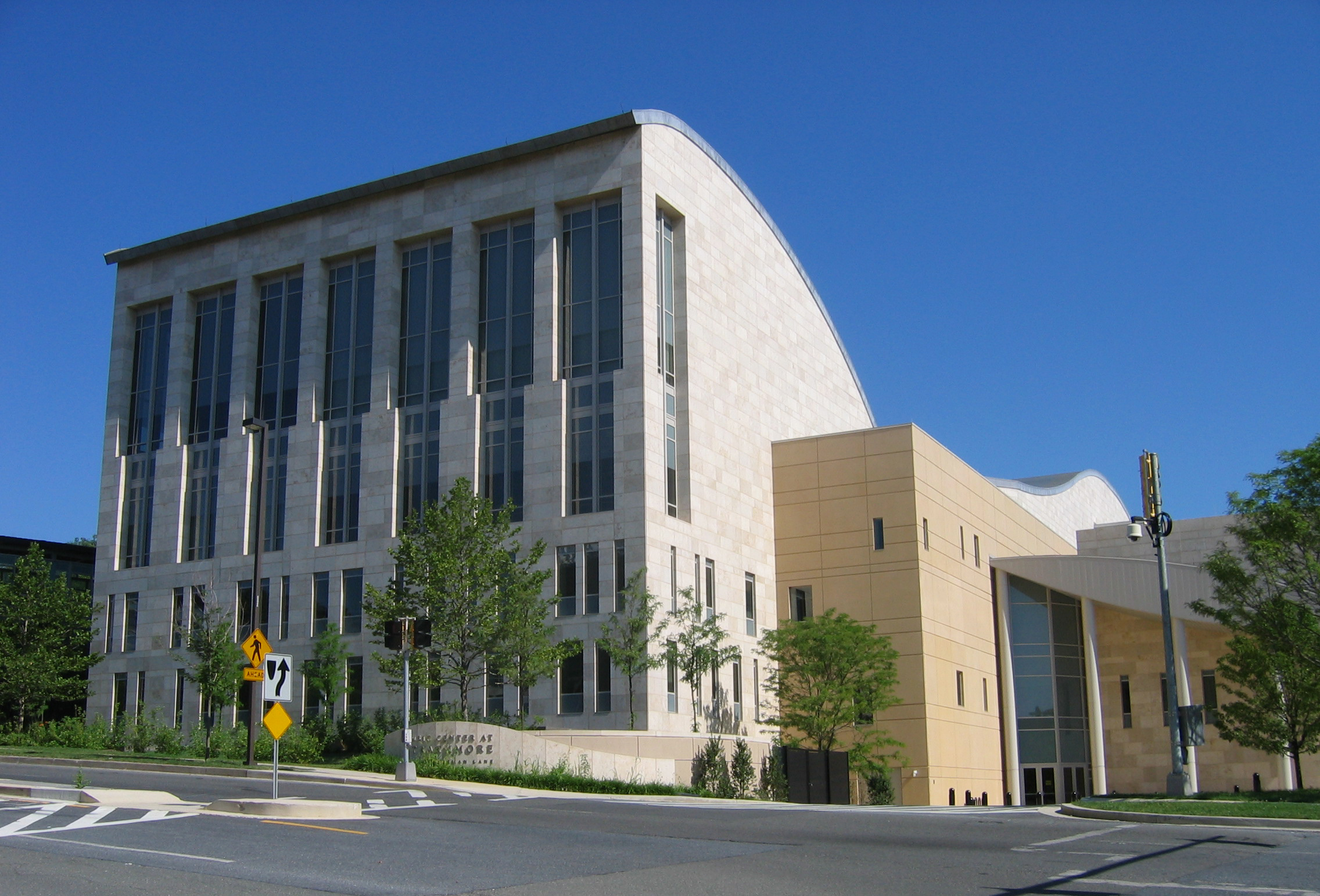
- Interactive map of The Music Center at Strathmore
- Address: 5301 Tuckerman Lane; North Bethesda, Maryland; United States
- Capacity: Music Center: 1,976; Amp: 250
- Type: Concert hall
- Public transit: Washington Metro at Grosvenor–Strathmore

Construction
- Opened: February 2005
- Years active: 2005–present
- Architects: William Rawn Associates; Grimm and Parker

Website
- www.strathmore.org

Strathmore is a cultural and artistic venue and institution in North Bethesda, Maryland, United States. Strathmore was founded in 1981 and consists of two venues: the Mansion and the Music Center.

It is the home to hundreds of performances and events per year presented by Strathmore Hall Foundation, the Baltimore Symphony Orchestra, National Philharmonic, Annapolis Symphony Orchestra, Levine Music, City Dance, interPLAY Orchestra, and others.

The Strathmore arts complex is connected to an upper floor of the parking garage at the Grosvenor-Strathmore Washington Metro station via an elevated pedestrian walkway, the Carlton R. Sickles Memorial Sky Bridge, named after late Congressman Carlton R. Sickles. The complex is thus accessible for patrons coming from Washington, D.C., as well as the northern part of Montgomery County, Maryland via the Metro rail system.

== Background ==
The center's President & CEO is Monica Jeffries Hazangeles. More than 5,000 artists and 2 million visitors have attended exhibitions, concerts, teas, educational events and outdoor festivals since 1983.

Highlights include hosting the first National Kaleidoscope Exhibition, the world premiere of the Rhodes-Nadler Art Collection, the opening of the 1,976-seat Music Center at Strathmore in February 2005, described as “…the best place to hear an orchestra the Washington area has ever known”; and producing the world premiere concert of "cELLAbration: A Tribute to Ella Jenkins".

== Performance and other facilities ==
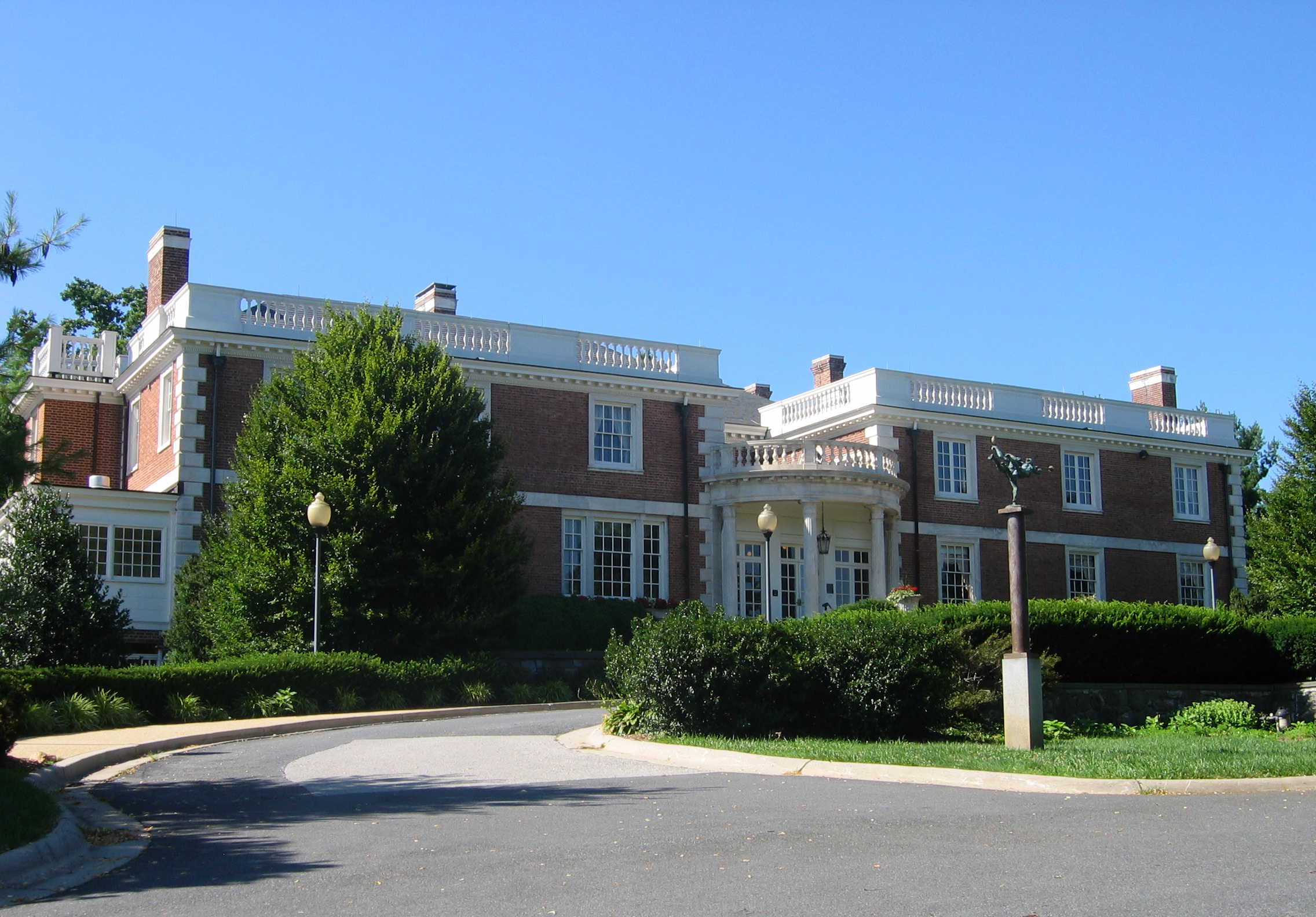
Strathmore Mansion

- The Mansion at Strathmore is situated on 11 acres (45,000 m^{2}) which surround the colonial revival mansion built in 1899 for the Oyster family, and sold to Charles Corby in 1908. The Mansion houses small concerts, art exhibitions, the Strathmore Tea Room, and the Shop at Strathmore. This is the original Strathmore venue and it remained so for almost 25 years.

The Mansion features the 100-seat Dorothy M. and Maurice C. Shapiro Music Room. This room hosts the Music in the Mansion series with performances of chamber music, vocal and instrumental recitals, jazz and folk music. There is an 1850 Broadwood piano, restored in 1994. There are free outdoor concerts in summer, as well as the Backyard Theater for Children every Thursday morning.

The art of Strathmore brings in thousands of visitors each year. There are more than two dozen exhibitions each season from local artists and from collaborations with renowned museums, such as the Baltimore Museum. The Gudelsky Gallery Suite, located at the top of the grand staircase, was named after philanthropists, Homer and Martha Gudelsky. Supported by a donation from the Gudelsky Family Foundation, this gallery features four galleries. It is the only venue of its kind in Montgomery County. There is also a Sculpture Garden that winds through the complex's 11 acres (45,000 m^{2}).

The Neo-Georgian mansion has columned porticos, Palladian windows and a hilltop setting, It was designed by Appleton P. Clark, Jr., and constructed in 1902 as a summer home for Captain James F. Oyster, Mrs. James Oyster and their family. In 1908, the Oysters sold the residence and its 99 acres (400,000 m^{2}) to Charles I. Corby and his wife, Hattie. It was used as a summer home until 1914 when it was remodeled by architect Charles Keene, and became the permanent abode for the Corby family. Mr. Corby died in 1926 after acquiring nearly 400 acres (1.6 km^{2}) of surrounding land and maintaining a fully operational dairy farm and a private golf course. With the death of Mrs. Corby in 1941, the home was purchased by the Sisters of the Holy Cross in 1943 and became known as St. Angela Hall, serving as a convent and school.

In 1977, the Sisters of the Holy Cross sold the mansion to the American Speech and Hearing Association (ASHA) as a temporary headquarters. In 1979, Montgomery County purchased the property from ASHA for an Arts Center. On June 21, 1983, after major restoration of the facility, Strathmore opened its doors to the public.

- The Music Center at Strathmore, which seats 1,976, is a concert hall and education center which opened in February 2005. It was funded by a combination of State of Maryland, Montgomery County, and private corporate and local resources to provide a modern concert venue for a wide variety of musical events.

Anchored by the founding partners, Strathmore and the Baltimore Symphony Orchestra, resident artistic partners include the National Philharmonic, Washington Performing Arts Society, CityDance Ensemble, Maryland Classic Youth Orchestras, and Levine School of Music.

The venue presents over 150 performances a year and over 75 arts and music education classes each week.

Designed by William Rawn Associates Architects, Inc. of Boston along with Grimm & Parker Architects of Bethesda, MD, acousticians Kirkegaard Associates of Chicago, and Theatre Projects Consultants of South Norwalk, Connecticut, the result is a venue that Tim Smith from The Baltimore Sun proclaims a, “first-class space for music-making.”

=== Design and acoustics ===
The Music Center at Strathmore features an undulating roof that outlines the sloping form of the concert hall. Inspired by the rolling hills of the Strathmore grounds, the 190,000-square-foot (18,000 m^{2}) building is nestled into an 11-acre (45,000 m^{2}) park-like setting.

The German limestone façade is punctuated by large glass walls. A six-story, 64-foot (20 m) high glass wall in the Lockheed Martin Lobby features 402 panes of glass, and opens to the outdoor Trawick Terrace that overlooks the Strathmore campus.

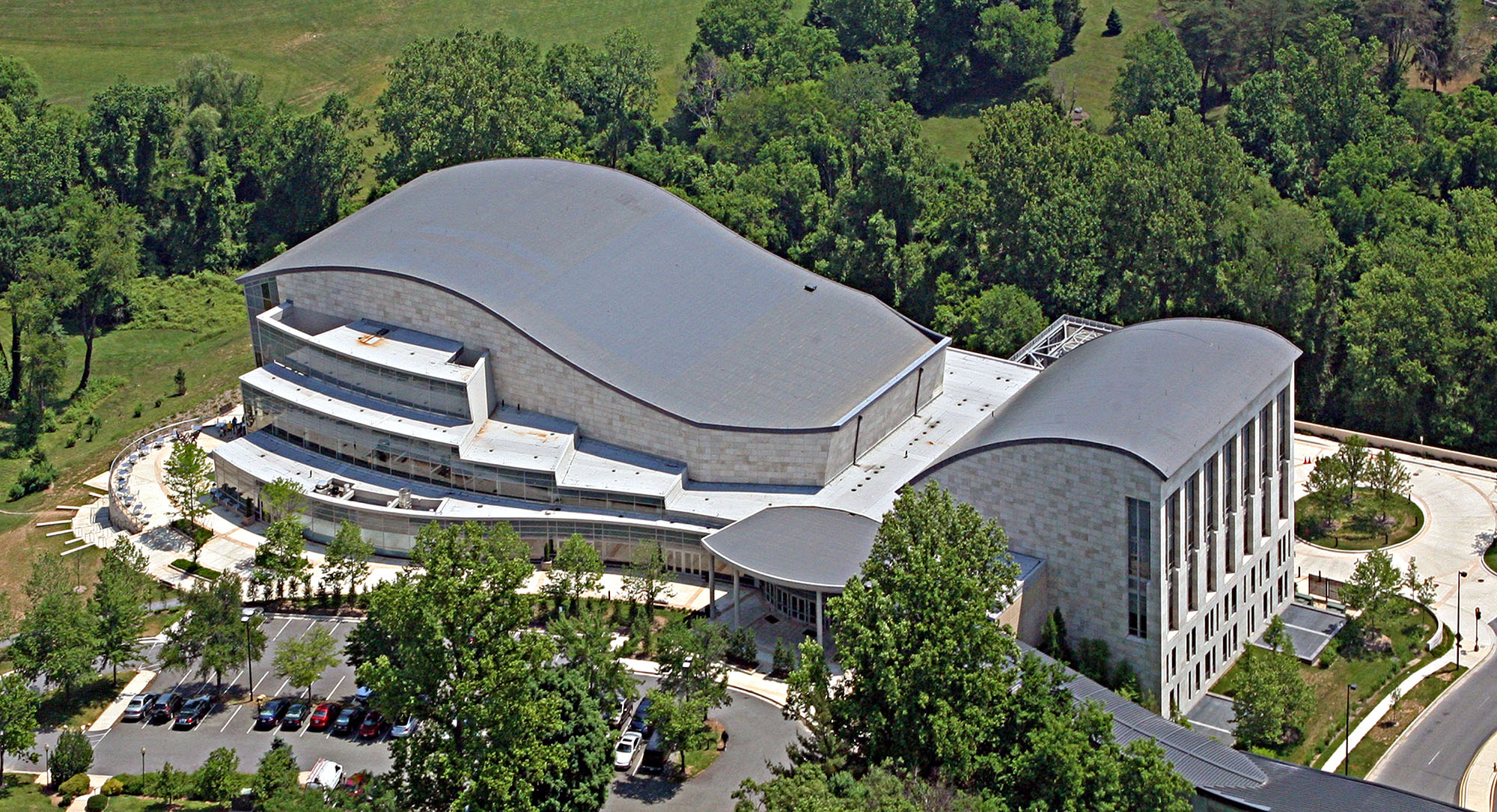
Stratmore Performing Arts Center

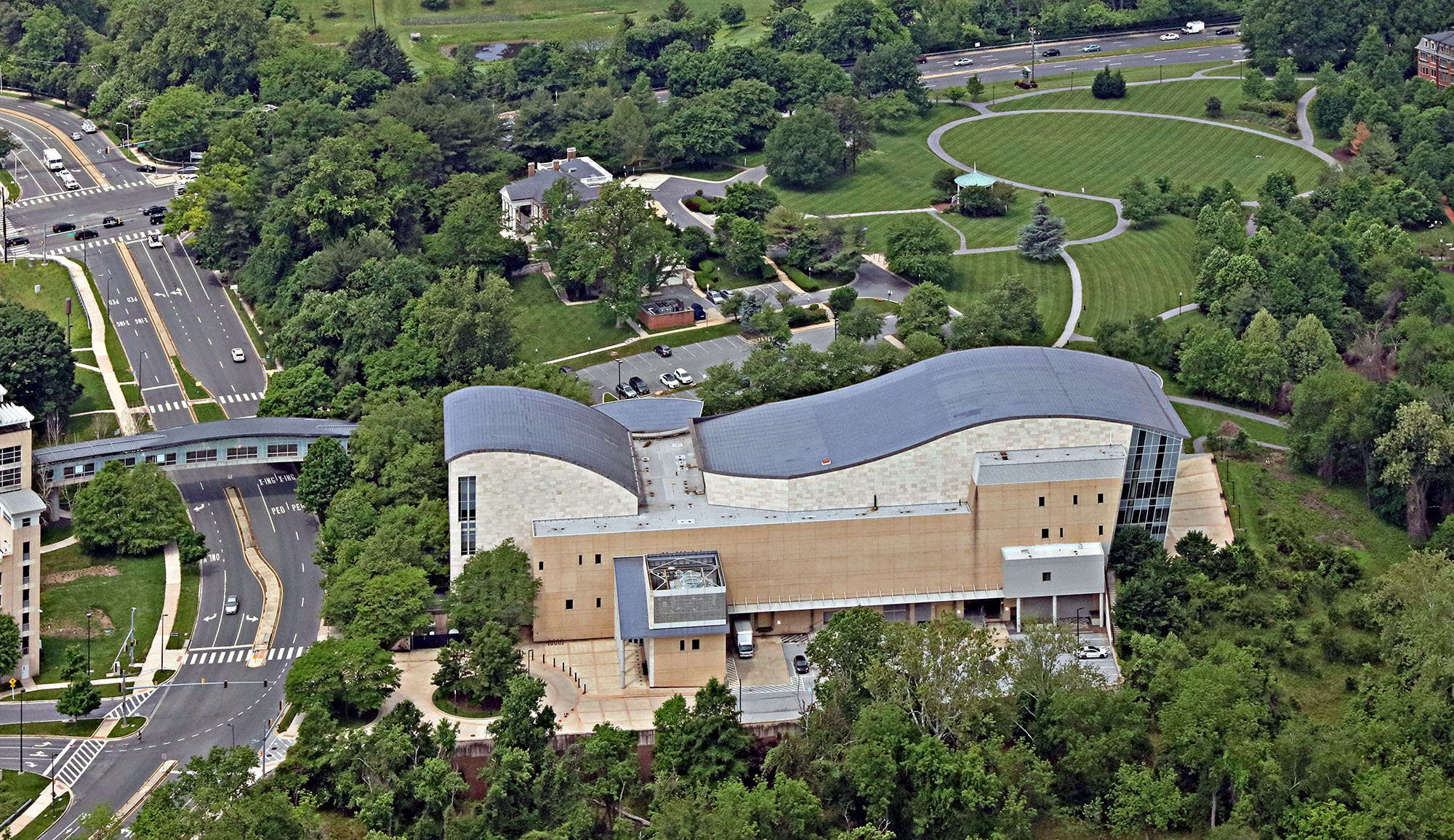
Strathmore (Maryland)

The concert hall was designed in the traditional “shoebox” form of many international concert halls. Above the stage, a mechanized canopy of 43 individually controlled acrylic panels can be adjusted to fine-tune sound for clarity and reverberation. Tunable sound-absorbing curtains behind the bronze grilling and banners in the ceiling can be deployed out of sight to dampen or enliven the sound.

The Education Center, located at the opposite end of the building, features four expansive rehearsal spaces, including a dance studio with a sprung floor and two rehearsal rooms with 40-foot (12 m) high ceilings. This wing of the building also features a children’s music classroom, a small two-story rehearsal room and nine solo and small group practice spaces.

== History ==
Strathmore, which began as a turn-of-the-century mansion featuring small chamber performances and art exhibitions in 1983, developed its plans for the Music Center over 20 years ago. In 1985, Strathmore’s Board of Directors and President and CEO Eliot Pfanstiehl began discussions about the need for a larger educational and performance space. In 1996, the Baltimore Symphony Orchestra, under the leadership of former president John Gidwitz, expressed interest in creating a second home in Montgomery County, and joined Strathmore as a founding partner of the Music Center at Strathmore.

In 1998, the Montgomery County Council and the Maryland State Legislature approved matching capital support ($48 million each) for the Music Center at Strathmore. After the design team was selected in 2001, work began under the direction of the county.

The public-private partnership between Strathmore Hall Foundation, Inc. assumes the day-to-day management and artistic programming of the Music Center and Mansion. Hundreds of donors stepped forward to help build, equip and sustain the operation of the Music Center.

- Gudelsky Concert Pavilion and Gazebo, for outdoor performances.
- Outdoor Sculpture Garden.

The grounds contain 23 commissioned and donated sculptures by various local and national artists, including works by Stefan Saal, Barton Rubenstein, Carol Gellner Levin, Foon Sham and Wendy Ross.

== Sculptures ==
Located on the Bou Family Terrace, "Tetra Con Brio," a monumental sculpture of cast bronze, steel, and polished concrete, stands 12 feet (3.7 m) tall and weighs 4,500 pounds. Created by California artist Roger W. Stoller. The statue is dedicated to Benjamin O'Brien, founder of Music & Arts Centers.

== Artist in Residence (AIR) Program ==
A flagship program of Strathmore’s Institute for Artistic and Professional Development, the Artist in Residence (AIR) program was created more than a decade ago to support artists as they transition to professional careers. Since its inception in 2005, the program has mentored 58 musicians ages 16–32. Every year a class of six is chosen after a competitive selection program. Strathmore Artists in Residence benefit from the support of mentor musicians, participate in professional development seminars, and are offered extensive performance opportunities throughout the 10-month program.

Artists who have been a part of the program are:

- Joey Antico
- Christylez Bacon
- Simone Baron
- Owen Danoff
- Ethan Foote
- Calista Garcia
- Chelsey Green
- Seán Heely
- Amadou Kouyate
- Patrick McAvinue
- Ines Nassara
- Piotr Pakhomkin
- Dante’ Pope
- Eliot Seppa
- Trey Sorrells
- Anjali Taneja
- Chris Urquiaga
- Frédéric Yonnet

== See also ==
- List of concert halls
- List of music museums
