= Hana Meisel =

Israeli agronomist (1883-1972)

- חנה מייזל
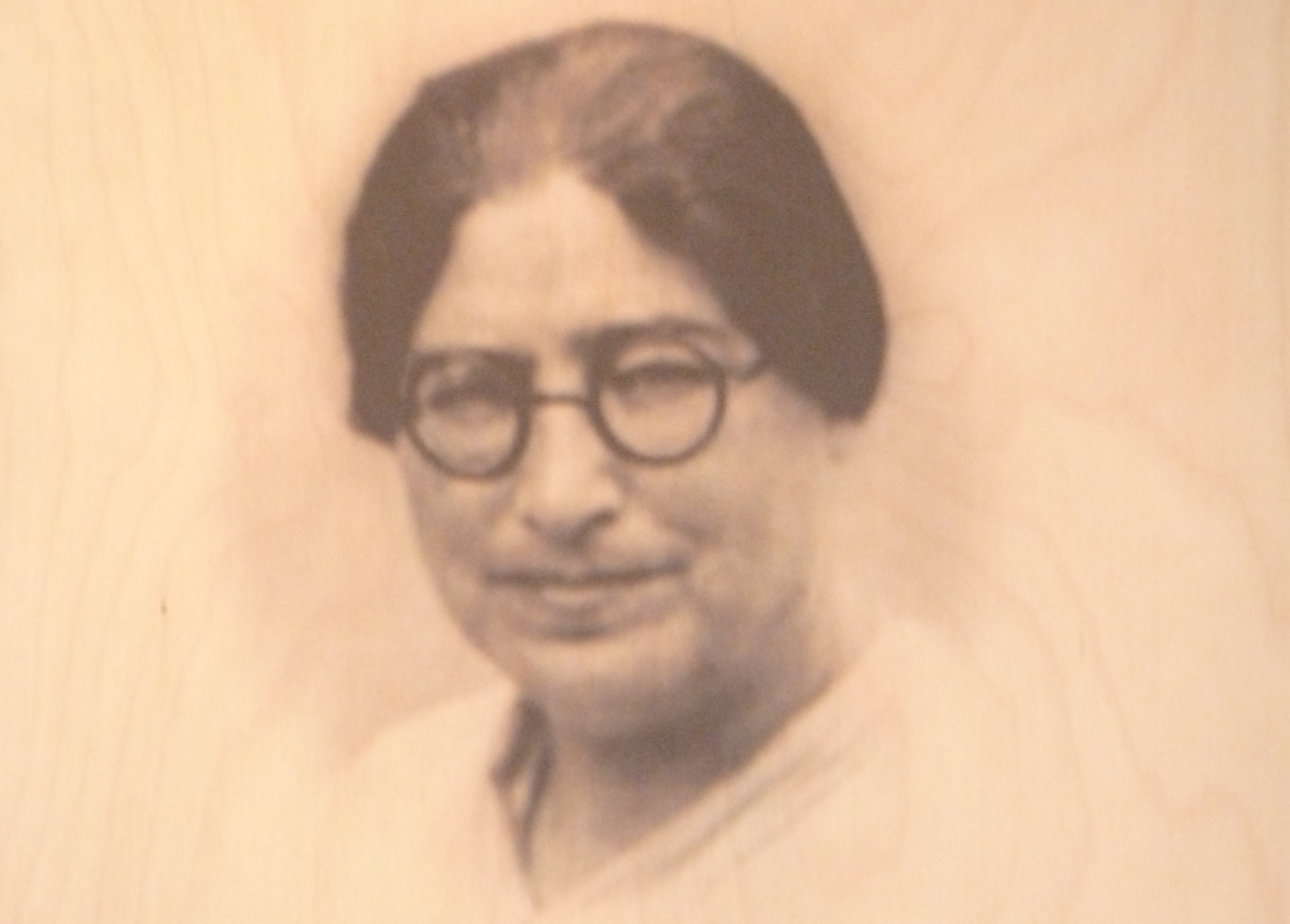
- Born: December 25, 1883; Hrodna, Russian Empire
- Died: 1972 (aged 88–89); Nahalal, Israel
- Burial place: Nahalal Cemetery
- Political party: Poale Zion

Hana Meisel (Hebrew: חנה מייזל; born 25 December 1883, died 1972) was a Jewish agronomist, feminist and Zionist leader.

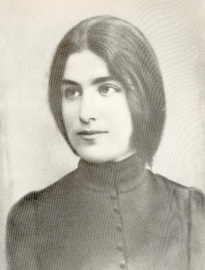
Hana Meisel

== Life ==
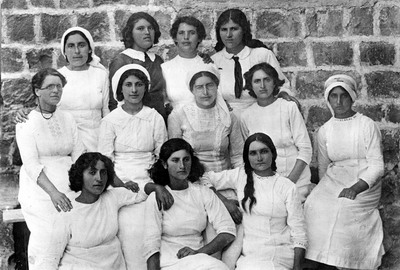
Meisel (middle row, third from left) with students at her agricultural school in 1912, Kinneret Farm

Meisel was born in Grodno in the Russian Empire (today Hrodna in Belarus), and immigrated to Palestine in 1909, during the Second Aliyah, where she became a noted agronomist. Meisel was a founder of Havat HaAlamot (Hebrew: חוות העלמות, "the maidens' farm") agricultural school at Kinneret Farm in 1911 (closed in 1917), and of the agricultural school for girls at Nahalal (opened in 1929). She studied agriculture and natural science in Odessa, Switzerland and France.

Meisel made considerable contributions to the feminist wing of the Zionist movement. She was a member of Poale Zion and was elected to the Assembly of Representatives.

She was married to Eliezer Shohat, also a well-known figure in the Zionist movement, much like his brother Israel Shochat.

Hana Meisel died at Nahalal in 1972.

== In literature ==
Meisel is referenced in Shmuel Yosef Agnon's fictionalized travelogue of the Second Aliyah HaGalilah (in English as "To the Galilee"), published in his posthumous volume Pithei Devarim.
