= Stotler =

Stotler is a surname. Notable people with the surname include:

- Alicemarie Huber Stotler (1942–2014), American judge
- Joseph H. Stotler (1888–1957), American horse trainer

== See also ==
- Stohler
