= Roger W. Stoller =

American sculptor (born 1954)

- Born: Roger White Stoller; January 21, 1954 (age 72); Los Angeles, California
- Education: Art Center College of Design (1981), San Jose State University: Foundry
- Known for: Public Art and Sculpture
- Website: www.stollerstudio.com

Roger White Stoller (born January 21, 1954) is an American sculptor who specializes in large works integrating stainless steel, bronze and granite. He currently works out of studios in Portola Valley and San Jose, California.

== Background ==
Stoller was born and raised in Santa Monica, California. His early influences include architect and global thinker R. Buckminster Fuller and sculptor Isamu Noguchi. Stoller received his Bachelor of Science in product design from the Art Center College of Design in 1981.

Over the next fifteen years, Stoller founded the design firm Stoller Design and co-founded Praxis Design Associates, both specializing in product development for corporate clients. While working in the field he taught in the industrial design program at San Jose State University.

In 1996, Stoller left Praxis and established the sculpture firm Stoller Studio, committing himself to sculpture entirely. He currently sculpts full-time out of studios in Portola Valley and San Jose, California.

== Artistic work ==
Stoller Studio's ongoing production is in public art, abstract fine art works and applied art commissions. Stoller specializes in large-scale, signature works including materials such as stainless steel, bronze, granite, water, and light. His sculpture often abstractly reflects forms found in nature. "By incorporating and interpreting the underlying geometry nature is using, I walk in the tension between precise control and the sheer joy of spontaneous expression. It is the awesome power of nature and the exploration into the essence of life that fuel my passion; this is why I sculpt." -Roger Stoller

== Notable installations ==
- Heritage Tree, Texas A&M University, College Station, TX, 2019
- Winged Helix, Dixie State University, St, George, UT, 2018
- Milan's Helix, Bellarmine College Prep, San Jose, CA 2018
- VIVO, City of Tamarac, FL, 2018
- Kindred Spirits, Pima Animal Control Center, Tucson, AZ, 2018
- L'Mara, El Paso Zoo, El Paso, TX, 2016
- Coastal Helix, City of Carlsbad, CA, 2014
- Sunhelix, Texas Tech University System, 2013
- Vibrant River, Ford Center, Evansville, IN, 2013
- Cloud Forest, Mitchell Park Library, Palo Alto, CA, 2013
- Luminous Oak, South Bowie Library, Largo, MD, 2012
- Oceano, Allen Public Library, Allen, TX, 2009
- Gateway Icon, City of Stockton, CA, 2009
- Tetra Con Brio, Strathmore Hall Arts Center, Bethesda, MD, 2006
