= Stollers =

British home furnishings retailer

Coordinates: 54.1214°N 3.2343°W

STOLLERS FURNITURE WORLD LIMITED
- Trade name: Stollers
- Company type: Private limited company
- Industry: Furniture
- Founded: 1905; 121 years ago
- Headquarters: Barrow-in-Furness, UK
- Products: Beds; Bedrooms; Carpets; Flooring; Rugs; Living room furniture; Lighting and accessories; Upholstery; Fires and Fireplaces
- Owner: Lee Stoller
- Website: www.stollers.co.uk

Stollers is a British-based home furnishings retailer. It is located at Walney Road, Barrow-in-Furness, Cumbria, England. It is currently one of the largest single site furniture stores in the country.

== History ==
Stollers was founded in 1905 by Latvian immigrant Isaiah Stoller, it began as a small market stall in Barrow Market, before a store was established on Barrow's main commercial street, Dalton Road. In the late 1920s, the store moved to larger premises on the same street and began to trade furniture, beds and floor coverings, although linens remained the stores best seller. After Isaiah's passing in 1944, his son Philip took over the family business, as the Barrow store continued to expand in range of product, two more locations were opened in Millom and Ulverston (now closed). The next generation of the Stoller family decided to move to a much larger location and make the store ready for the 21st century, in 1994 David Stoller purchased land opposite where Barrow's Asda store is currently located. The store was opened on 1 December 1994 and became the largest single site furniture retailer in the North West, the store won the NatWest Streamline Independent Retailer of the Year Excellence Award and was finalist in the prestigious UK Furniture Industry Awards "Retailer of the Year". In 2004 a brand new extension was opened which brought the total retail area to 110,000 sq ft (10,000 m^{2}), and ultimately making it one of the largest furniture stores in the United Kingdom.

== Products ==
Stollers specialises in home furnishing, selling products ranging from sofas, mirrors, cabinets, tables, chairs, carpets, flooring, rugs, fires and fireplaces, as well as a large lighting and accessories area. Stollers is also home to a coffee shop and restaurant, and distributes products across the UK and elsewhere. Stollers has the largest selection of furniture in the area, offers interest free credit, and many items are available for immediate delivery or can be taken with you after purchase.
