= Stollery =

Stollery is a surname. Notable people with the surname include:

- Christopher Stollery (born 1965), Australian television actor
- David Stollery (born 1941), former American child actor and, as an adult, an industrial designer
- Karl Stollery (born 1987), Canadian ice hockey player
- Pete Stollery (born 1960), British composer, specialising in electroacoustic music
- Peter Stollery (born 1935), Canadian politician and businessman
- John Stollery (1930–2013), British engineer and academic

== See also ==
- Stollery Children's Hospital
