= Berl Katznelson =

Jewish intellectual (1887–1944)

- ברל כצנלסון
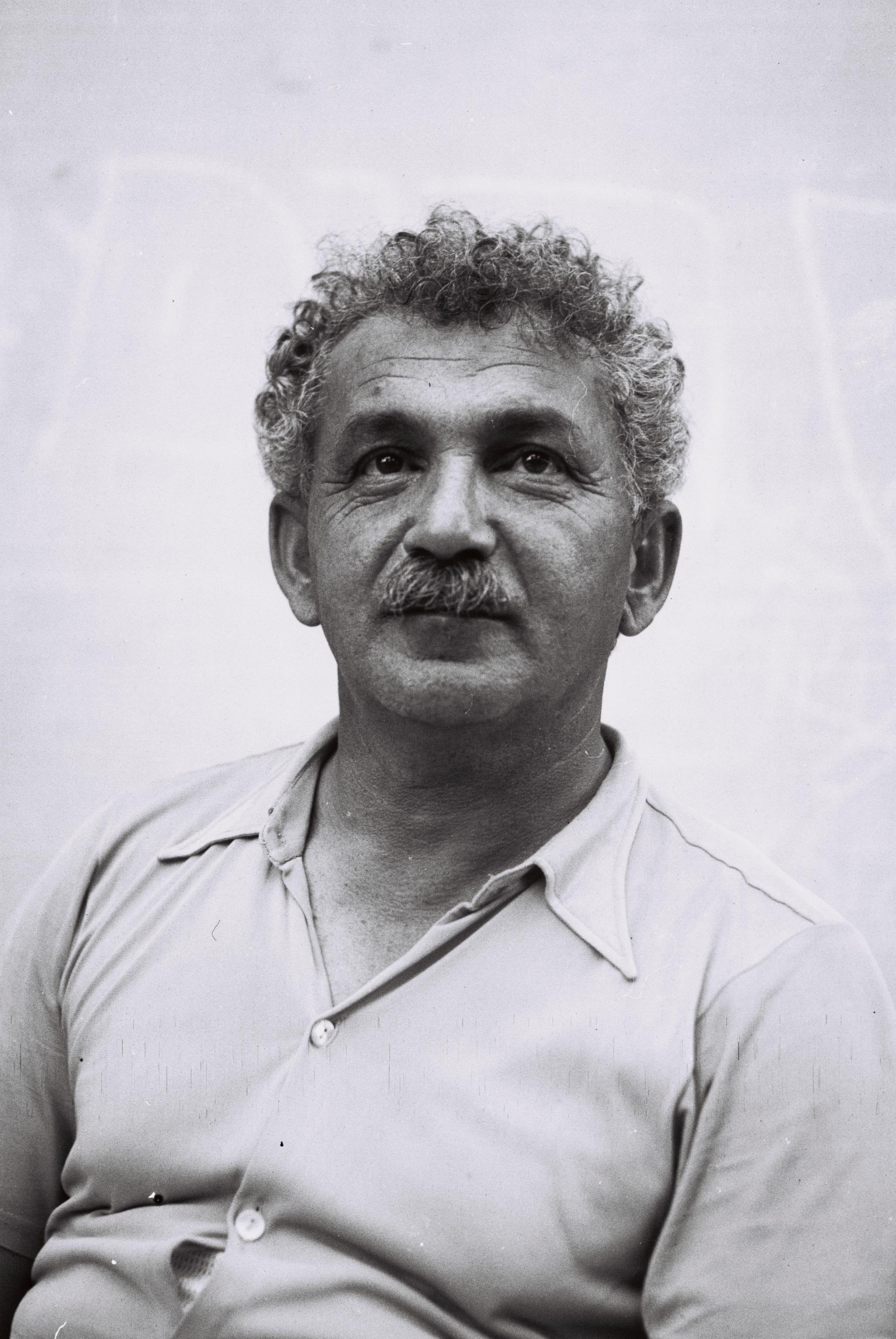
- Berl Katznelson in 1934
- Born: January 25, 1887; Babruysk, Russian Empire (now Belarus)
- Died: August 12, 1944 (aged 57); Jerusalem, Mandatory Palestine
- Political party: Mapai
- Relatives: Yitzhak Tabenkin (second cousin)

Berl Katznelson (Hebrew: ברל כצנלסון; 25 January 1887 – 12 August 1944) was one of the intellectual founders of Labor Zionism and was instrumental to the establishment of the modern state of Israel. He was also the editor of Davar, the first daily newspaper of the Histadrut.

== Biography ==
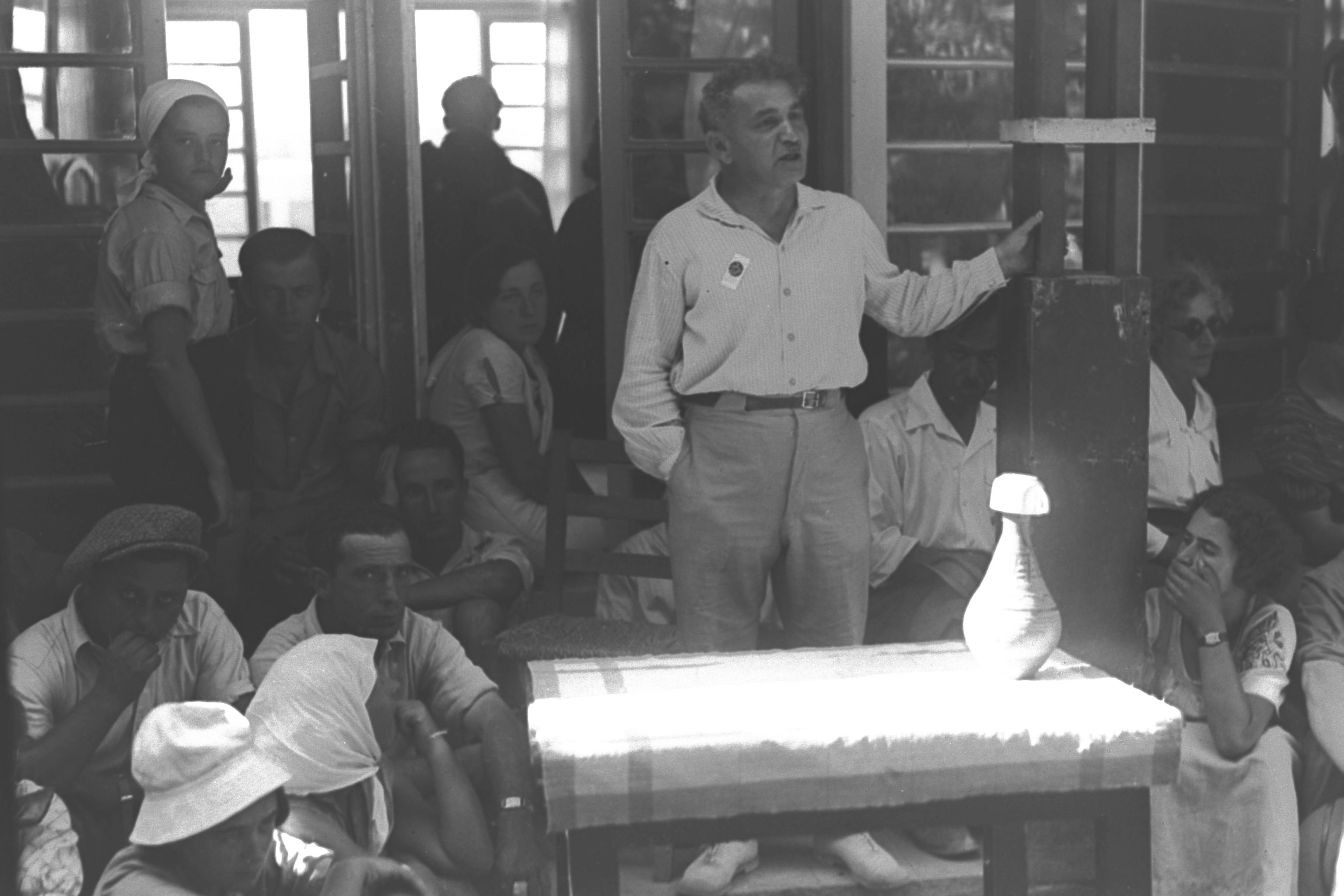
Katznelson at Ben Shemen

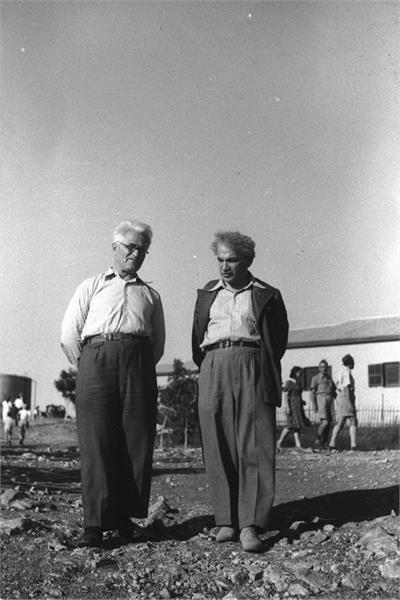
Avraham Herzfeld with Berl Katznelson, Ma'ale HaHamisha 1943

Katznelson was born to a Lithuanian Jewish family in Babruysk, Russian Empire (nowadays Belarus), the son of a member of Hovevei Zion. He dreamed of settling in the Jewish homeland from an early age. In Russia, he was a librarian in a Hebrew-Yiddish library and taught Hebrew literature and Jewish history. He made aliyah to Ottoman Palestine in 1909, where he worked in agriculture and took an active role in organizing workers' federations based on the idea of "common work, life and aspirations."

Together with his cousin, Yitzhak Tabenkin, Katznelson was one of the founding fathers of the workers union, the Histadrut founded in 1920 in Mandatory Palestine and then part of the Yishuv (the body of Jewish residents in the region before Israel's creation). In this capacity, together with Meir Rothberg of the Kinneret Farm, Katznelson founded in 1916 the consumer co-operative known as Hamashbir with the goal of supplying the Jewish communities of Palestine with food at affordable prices during the terrible shortage years of the First World War. When the British army reached southern Palestine in 1918, Katznelson joined the Jewish Legion. He was released from the army in 1920 and resumed his activities in the Labor Zionist movement. He helped to establish the Clalit Health Services sick fund, a major fixture in Israel's network of socialized medicine. In 1925, together with Moshe Beilinson, Katznelson established the Davar daily newspaper, and became its first editor, a position he held until his death, as well as becoming the founder and first editor-in-chief of the Am Oved publishing house.

Katznelson was well known for his desire for peaceful coexistence between Arabs and Jews in Mandatory Palestine. He was an outspoken opponent of the Peel Commission's partition plan for Palestine. He stated:

I do not wish to see the realization of Zionism in the form of the new Polish state with Arabs in the position of the Jews and the Jews in the position of the Poles, the ruling people. For me this would be the complete perversion of the Zionist ideal... Our generation has been witness to the fact that nations aspiring to freedom who threw off the yoke of subjugation rushed to place this yoke on the shoulders of others. Over the generations in which we were persecuted and exiled and slaughtered, we learned not only the pain of exile and subjugation, but also contempt for tyranny. Was that only a case of sour grapes? Are we now nurturing the dream of slaves who wish to reign?

In the late 1930s and early 1940s, Katznelson advocated that the transfer of the natives of Palestine be extended, citing as a positive model the Soviet deportation of the Volga Germans to Siberia. In a 1937 congress of the Mapai he stated:

The question of the transfer of population has given rise to discussion among us: is it allowed or forbidden? My conscience is clear on this point absolutely. A remote neighbor is better than a close enemy. They will not lose from being transferred and we shall certainly not lose from it . . . I have long been of the opinion that this is the best of all solutions, and in the days of gloom I was reinforced in my awareness that it must come someday. But I never imagined that the transfer would be merely to the neighborhood of Nablus. I always believed that they were destined to be transferred to Syria and Iraq.

Katznelson also spoke of Jewish self-hatred, saying:

"Is there another People on Earth so emotionally twisted that they consider everything their nation does despicable and hateful, while every murder, rape, robbery committed by their enemies fill their hearts with admiration and awe?"

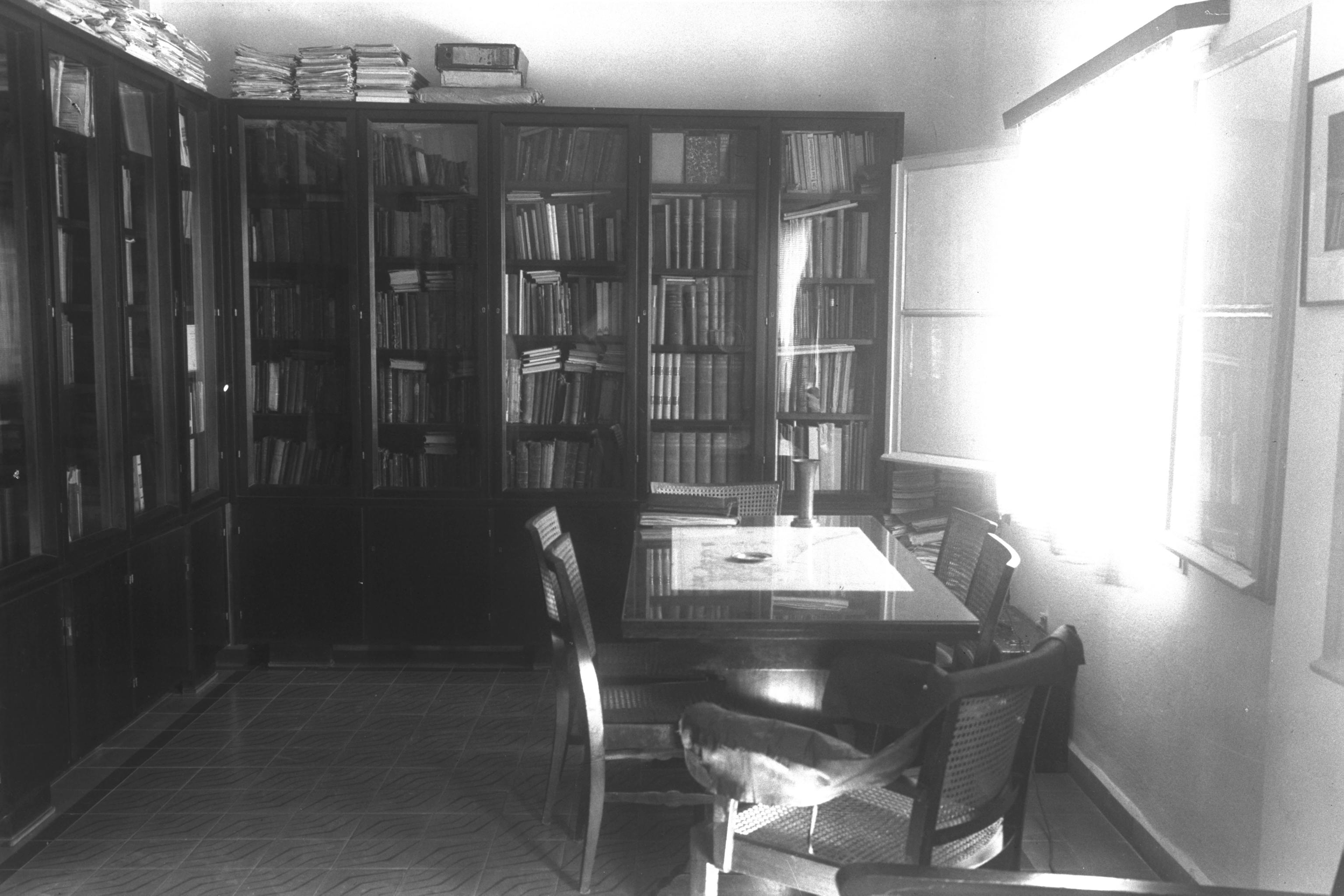
Katnelson's study

Katznelson died of an aneurysm in 1944 and was buried at his request in the cemetery on the shores of the Sea of Galilee, next to Sarah Shmukler.

== Memories of Katznelson ==
In her autobiography My Life, Golda Meir remembers Berl Katznelson as a pivotal figure in the life of the Jewish community in Palestine:

"Berl was not at all physically impressive. He was small, his hair was always untidy, his clothes always looked rumpled. But his lovely smile lit up his face, and [he] looked right through you, so that no one who ever talked to Berl forgot him. I think of him as I saw him, hundreds of times, buried in a shabby old armchair in one of the two book-lined rooms in which he lived in the heart of old Tel-Aviv, where everyone came to see him and where he worked (because he hated going to an office). 'Berl would like you to stop by' was like a command that no one disobeyed. Not that he held court or ever gave orders, but nothing was done, no decision of any importance to the Labour movement in particular or the yishuv in general, was taken without Berl's opinion being sought first."

== Commemorations ==
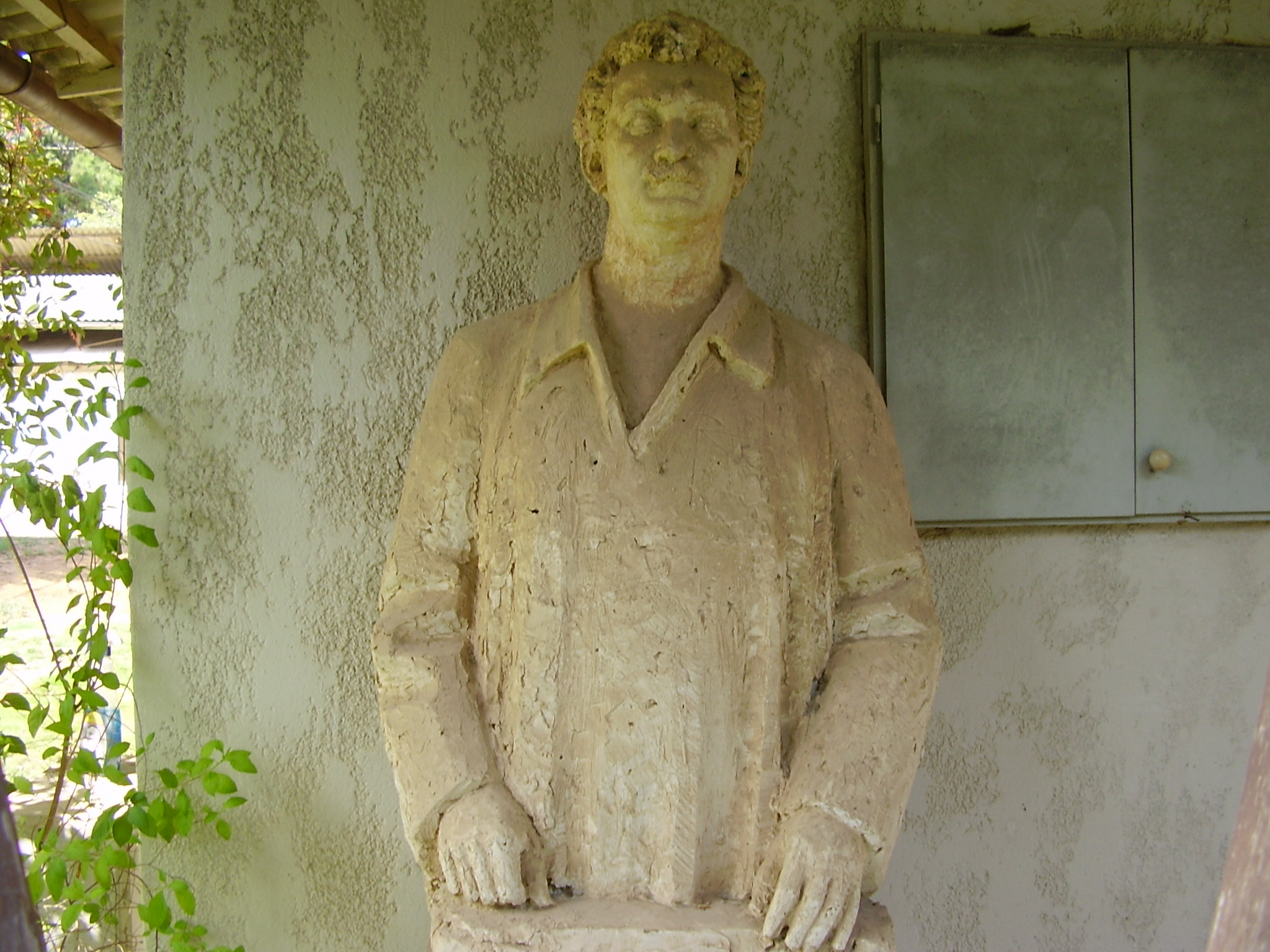
A sculpture of Katznelson by Jacob Luchansky located at Givat Brenner.

Katznelson is commemorated in many ways throughout Israel:

- Beit Berl near Tzofit
- Berl Katznelson (ship)
- Ohalo (lit. his tent)
  - Ohalo a site along the shore of the Sea of Galilee where Katznelson set up a tent
  - Ohalo II an archaeological site near Ohalo
  - Ohalo College which used to be located at Ohalo
- Kibbutz Be'eri (which takes Katznelson's literary name).
- Streets in many cities in Israel
- A high school in Kfar Saba
- A commemorative stamp issued by the Israeli Postal Service
