= Avraham Herzfeld =

Israeli politician (1891–1973)

- אברהם הרצפלד
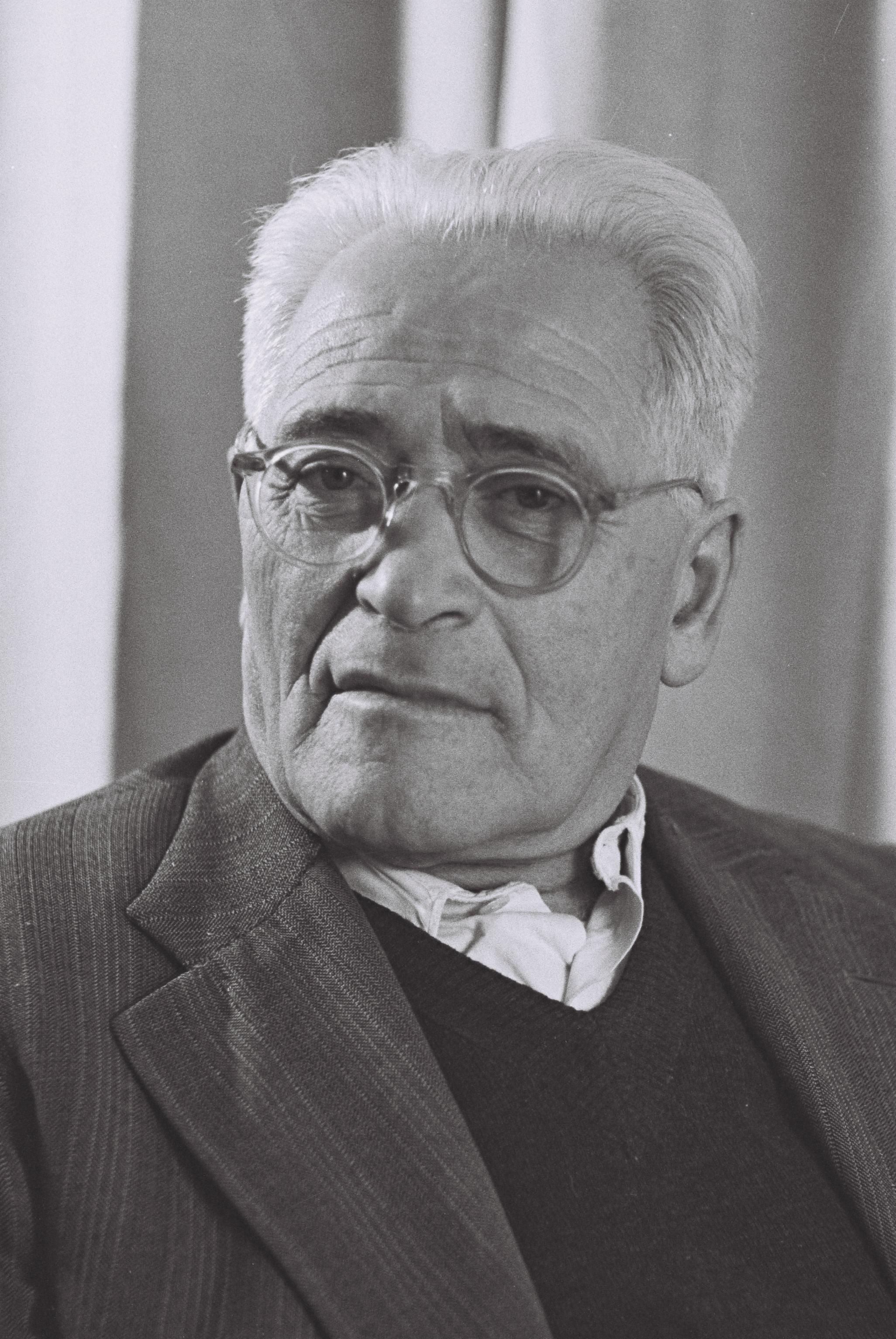

Faction represented in the Knesset
- 1949–1961: Mapai

Personal details
- Born: 21 June 1891 Stavisht, Kiev Governorate, Russian Empire (present-day Ukraine)
- Died: 30 August 1973 (aged 82) Petah Tikva, Israel

Avraham Herzfeld (also Harzfeld) (Hebrew: אברהם הרצפלד; 5 June 1891 – 30 August 1973) was a Zionist activist and Israeli politician.

== Biography ==
Avraham Herzfeld (born Avraham Postrelko) was born in Stavisht, Russian Empire (now Ukraine) in 1891. He attended a yeshiva and was certified as a rabbi. In 1906, he joined the Socialist Zionists. He was arrested in Vilna in 1910 for revolutionary activities, and was exiled to Siberia. In 1914, he immigrated to Ottoman Palestine and worked as an agricultural laborer in Petah Tikva.

== Public and political career ==
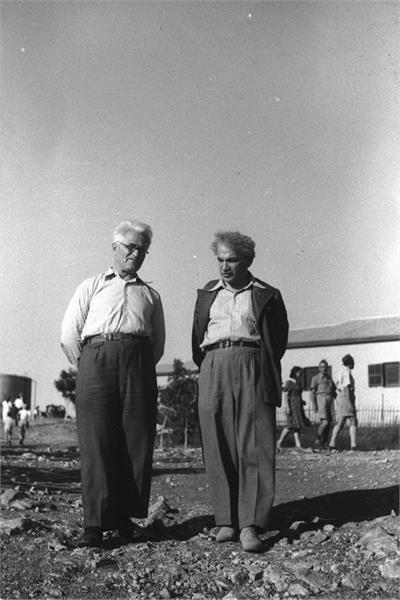
Avraham Herzfeld with Berl Katznelson, Ma'ale HaHamisha 1943

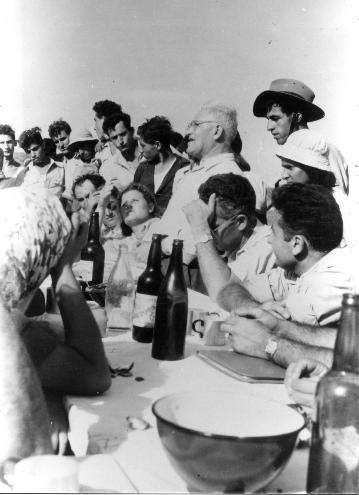
Avraham Herzfeld giving a speech during the establishment of Kibbutz Harel, 27 October 1948.

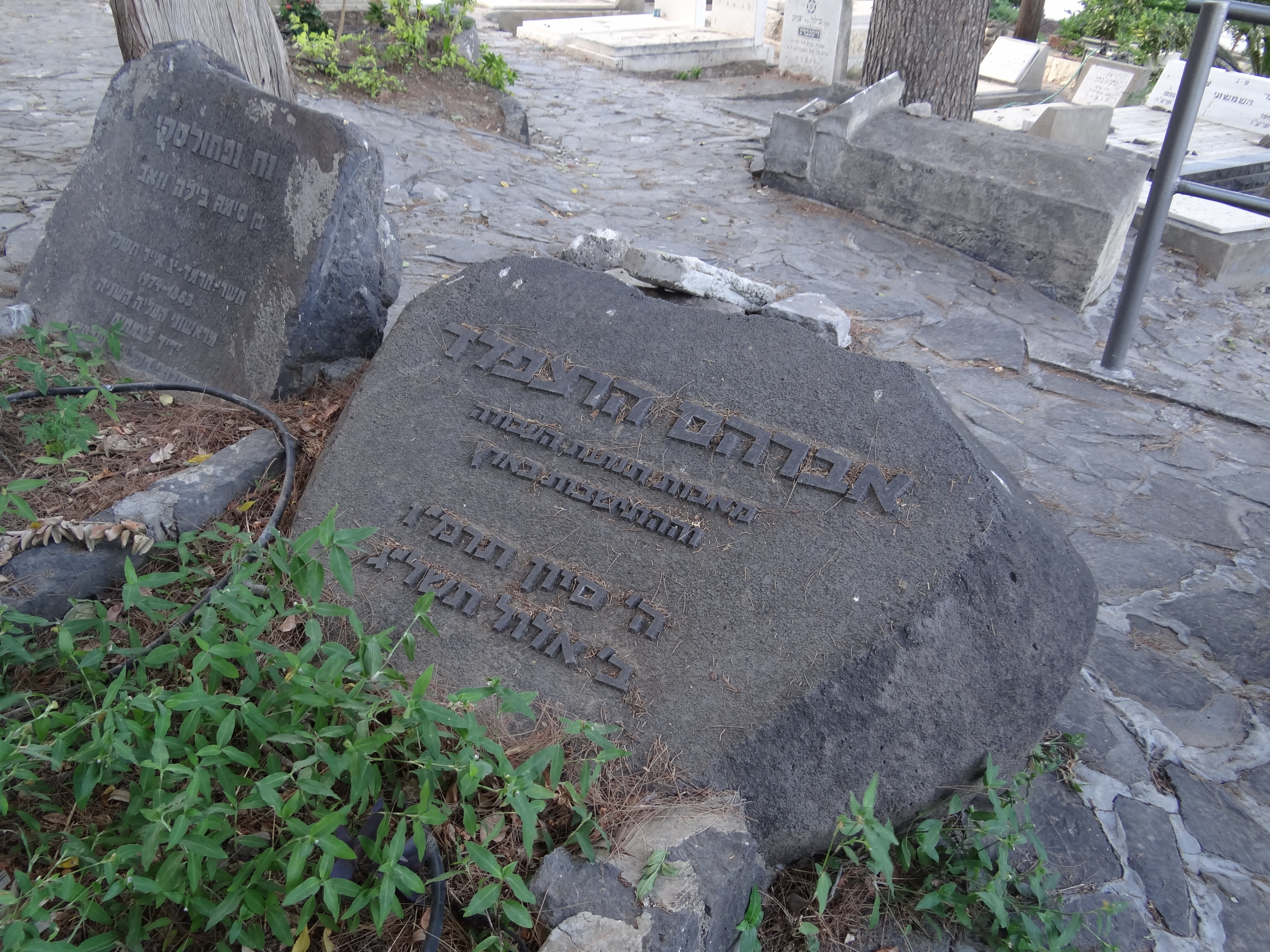
Herzfeld's grave, Kinneret cemetery.

During World War I, Herzfeld was active on behalf of Yishuv members arrested by the Ottoman authorities. From 1914 to 1918 he was a member of the Poale Zion party. He was one of the founders of the Ahdut HaAvoda party in 1919 and one of its active members until 1930, when he joined Mapai. In 1920, he was one of the founders of the Histadrut. He was also one of leaders of HaMerkaz HaHakla'i, the Zionist agricultural association in Palestine.

He headed the settlement department of the Agricultural Association and was involved in the establishment of new settlements for forty years. He was a member of the Jewish National Fund from 1949 to his death. He was known for his habit of bursting into song, sometimes in the middle of his speeches. On the establishment of kibbutz Hatzerim in 1946, he sang a popular song: "This is our fate, / Thus we are commanded, / This is the road, / This our aim, / We have not labored in vain".

In 1949, Herzfeld was elected to the first Knesset for Mapai and remained an MK until 1965. He was a member of the Knesset's Finance Committee, to which he would refer as the "Finance Commission". After his retirement, he worked for the elderly. In 1972, he was awarded the Israel Prize for his special contribution to society and the State.

== Legacy ==
Avraham Herzfeld died in 1973. His house in Holon serves as a museum of the city's history.

He initiated and raised funds to establish a hospital in Gedera in 1963, part of the Histadrut's Clalit Health Maintenance Organization. The hospital, which bears his name, was repurposed in 1983 as a geriatric rehabilitation health center. Moshav Sdei Avraham is named after him.

== See also ==
- List of Israel Prize recipients
