= Yitzhak Tabenkin =

Israeli politician

- יצחק טבנקין
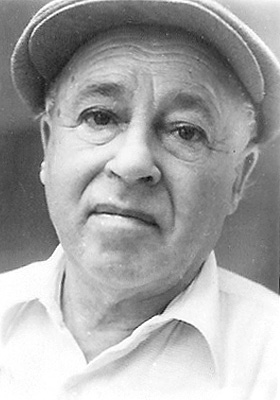

Faction represented in the Knesset
- 1949–1951: Mapam
- 1955–1959: Ahdut HaAvoda

Personal details
- Born: 8 January 1888 Babruysk, Bobruysky Uyezd, Minsk Governorate, Russian Empire
- Died: 6 June 1971 (aged 83) Ein Harod, Israel
- Spouse: Eva
- Children: 3, including Joseph
- Relatives: Berl Katznelson (second cousin)

Yitzhak Tabenkin (Hebrew: יצחק טבנקין; 8 January 1888 – 6 June 1971) was a Zionist activist and Israeli politician. He was a co-founder of the Kibbutz Movement and several political parties, including Movement for a Greater Israel.

== Early life ==
Yitzhak Tabenkin was born in 1888 in Babruysk, then part of the Russian Empire (now Belarus), to Moshe and Gitl (née Katznelson) Tabenkin. His mother was the cousin of Berl Katznelson's father.

Tabenkin attended a cheder in Warsaw and later received a secular education. His father left Orthodox Judaism in his youth and became involved in radical politics, serving time as a political prisoner, while his mother was active in Poland’s revolutionary intelligentsia. Tabenskin cited Hayim Nahman Bialik, Peter Kropotkin, Mikhail Bakunin, and Karl Marx as influences.

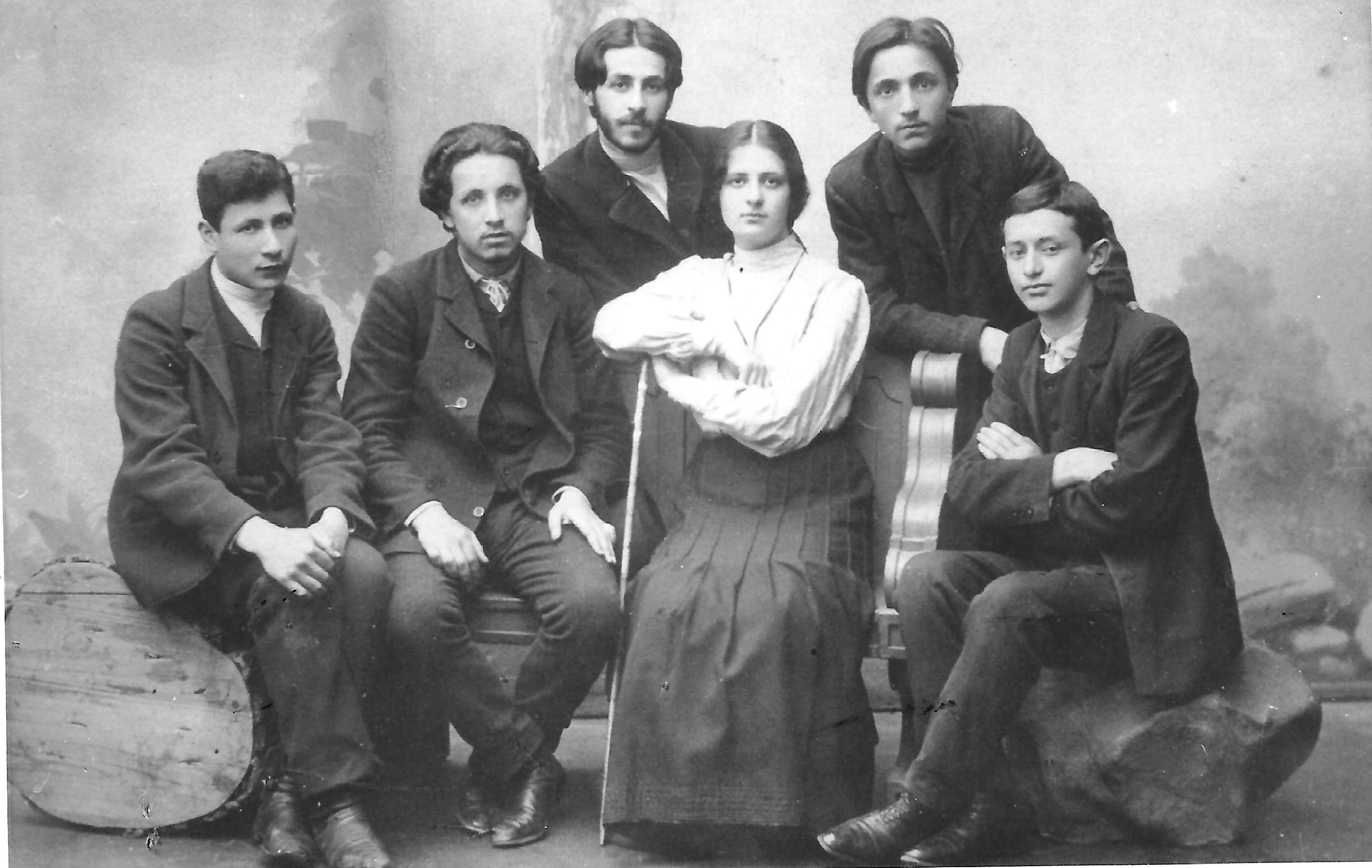
Poalei Zion members in Warsaw, Congress Poland, 1905. Standing (L-R): Yitzhak Tabenkin, Eliezer Salzkin. Seated: Elkana Horowitz, Yosef Zaltzman, Eva Tabenkin, Max Tabenkin (who never emigrated to Israel).

Tabenkin was among the founders of Poale Zion in Poland. In 1912, he immigrated to Ottoman Palestine, working as an agricultural laborer in Merhavia and Kfar Uria. During World War I, he worked on the Kinneret Farm. After the war, he was a delegate to each Zionist Congress.

Tabenkin joined the defense organization HaShomer and was active in agricultural laborers' organizations in what would later be called the West Bank. In 1921, he became a member of Gdud HaAvoda, and was one of the founders of the first kibbutz proper (as opposed to smaller-scale kvutza), Ein Harod, where he was considered a spiritual leader. He also undertook a mission on behalf of HeHalutz to Poland to encourage Jewish settlement in Palestine.

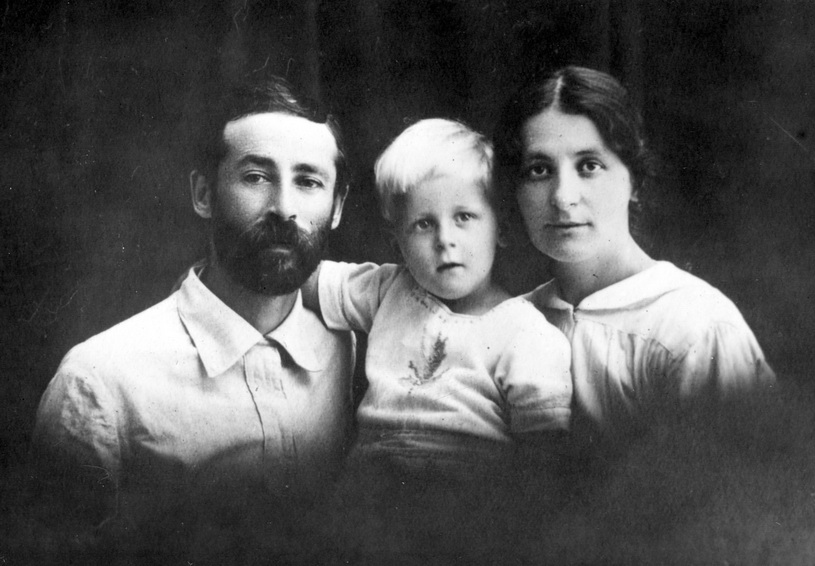
Tabenkin with his wife Eva and son Moshe, 1922

Tabenkin supported a "bottom-up" approach to Labor Zionism and advocated for Jewish settlement across the entire territory he considered the historical Land of Israel. He regarded the political borders of the Middle East following the partition of the Ottoman Empire as imposed by European imperialism. He expressed a vision of the entire Jewish people living in communes as part of a "worldwide alliance of communist peoples". He referred to the Great Revolt as an event that perpetuated the Jewish national existence.

== Political career ==
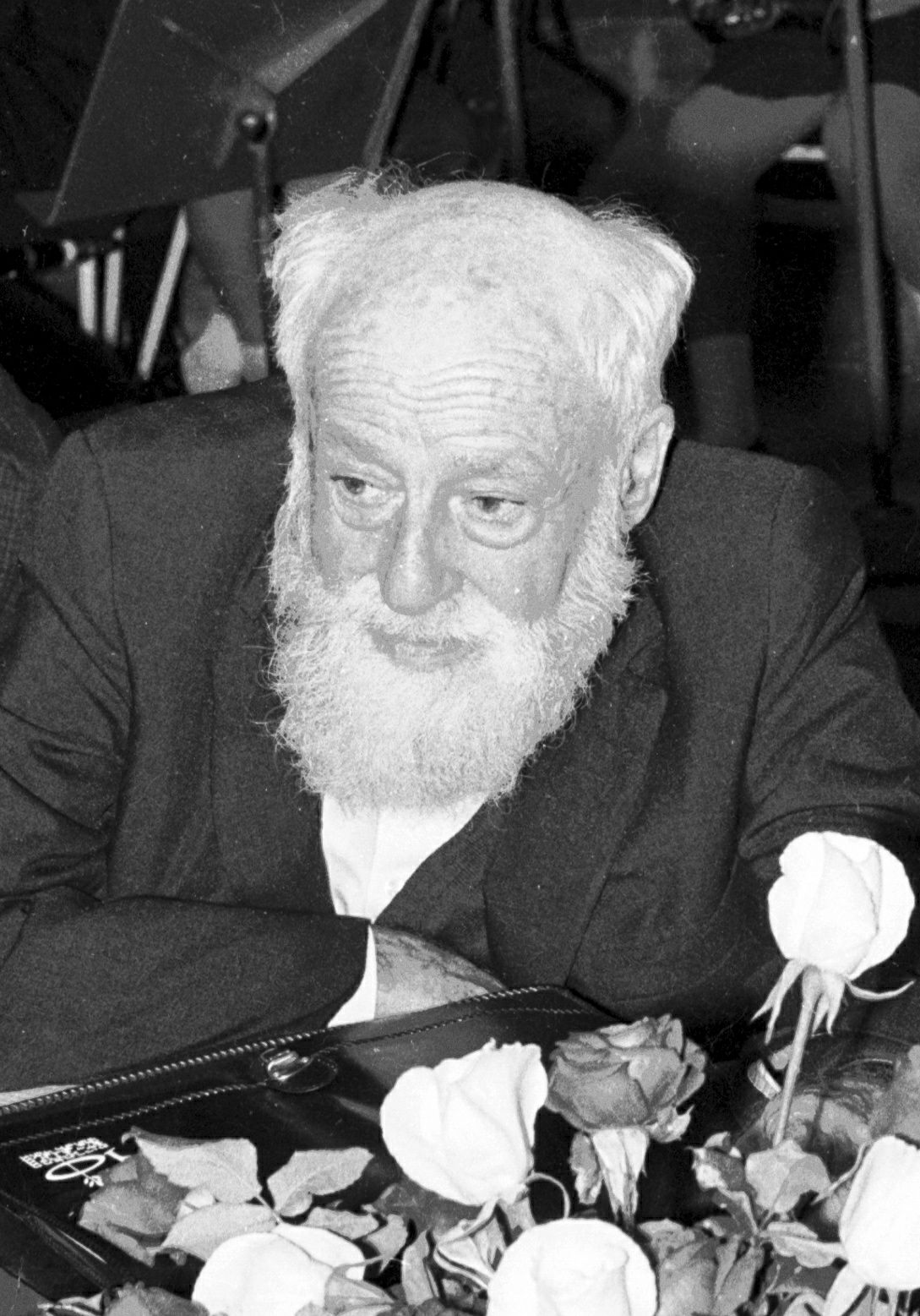
Tabenkin at the 10th Convention of the Histadrut, January 4, 1966

Tabenkin was one of the founders of Ahdut HaAvoda. In 1930, he helped establish Mapai and was one of its leaders alongside David Ben-Gurion and Berl Katznelson. He opposed the Peel Commission’s recommendations and resisted efforts by Ben-Gurion to reach a compromise with the Revisionist Zionists.

In 1944, Tabenkin led the "Bet" faction that split from Mapai to form a new Ahdut HaAvoda party. In 1948, he was involved in the founding of Mapam and was elected to the first Knesset in the 1949 Israeli Constituent Assembly election. In 1954, he resigned from Mapam over disagreements regarding relations with the Soviet Union, remaining a leader of Ahdut HaAvoda. He was elected to the third Knesset in the 1955 Israeli legislative election.

Tabenkin opposed Israel’s withdrawal from the Sinai Peninsula and Gaza following the Suez Crisis and compared it to the Munich Agreement. He said Israel's right to the Sinai and Gaza was derived from the Ten Commandments and the blood of the Israeli soldiers killed in the conflict.

During the 1960s, Tabenkin stated that the 1949 Armistice Agreements would not last. In June 1966, he stated "Anywhere war will allow, we shall go to restore the country's integrity".

After the Six-Day War of 1967, he opposed any concession of territories captured during the conflict. He considered the addition of over a million Arabs to Israel's population a problem that could be solved by a massive aliyah. Tabenkin supported the Movement for Greater Israel and believed Israel’s military victories would awaken the Jewish diaspora.

== Personal life and legacy ==
Tabenkin's son, Joseph Tabenkin, became the Fourth Battalion commander of the Palmach's Harel Brigade.

Tabenkin lived at Ein Harod until his death in 1971.

Yitav, an Israeli settlement and moshav shitufi in the southern Jordan Valley of the West Bank, is named after Tabenkin.

A collection of Yitzhak Tabenkin's personal papers and correspondence is stored today at the Tabenkin Memorial (Yad Tabenkin) in Ramat Ef'al.

== Published works ==
- The Jewish State and the Way to Achieve It (1944) (in Hebrew)
- Kibbutz Society (1954) (in Hebrew)
- There is No Where to Pullback To (1968) (in Hebrew)
- Lessons of the Six Day War (1970) (in Hebrew)
- Issues (Four Volumes of Articles) (1967) (in Hebrew)
