= Shmuel Stoller =

Israeli scientist (1898–1977)

Shmuel Stoller שמואל סטולר
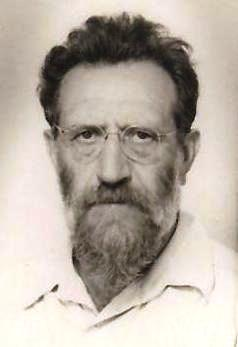
- Born: August 15, 1898; Moscow, Russian Empire
- Died: March 6, 1977 (aged 78); Israel
- Scientific career
- Fields: Agronomy

Shmuel Stoller (Hebrew: שמואל סטולר; August 15, 1898 – March 6, 1977) was an Israeli agronomist and an early member of the Zionist movement.

== Biography ==
Stoller was born in 1898 in Moscow, Russian Empire. In 1915, he graduated from high school and began to study history and linguistics at Moscow State University. In February 1917, he was drafted into the ranks of the army of the Russian Empire, but he deserted after the October Revolution and moved with his family to the Crimea.

Stoller studied at Simferopol Agriculture and Natural Sciences. In 1920 he married Yonah. Yonah and Shmuel Stoller immigrated to Mandate Palestine shortly thereafter and joined the Gdud HaAvoda (The Work Battalion) as part of a group headed by Yitzhak Sadeh. Stoller became involved in agriculture and agricultural research, and in 1938, he headed a group concentrating on the Jordan Valley, and was responsible for developing methods of irrigation, irrigated agriculture and plantations. In particular, Stoller was responsible for the importation and development of conditions suitable for new varieties of bananas, dates and vines.

Stoller was one of the founders of Kvutzat Kinneret.

Stoller also devoted himself to education, and in 1946 he was founder and director of the Bet Yerah Agricultural School.

== Awards and honours ==
- In 1965, he was awarded the Israel Prize for his work in agriculture.

== Family ==
Shmuel and Jonah Stoller had a large family - they had three sons: Noach, Uri and Menachem; five daughters: Netta, Sarah, Dinah, Batya and Alik; and twenty-four grandchildren. Both are buried in the Kinneret Cemetery.

== See also ==
- List of Israel Prize recipients
