= List of sacred places in Israel =

Sacred place list in Israel

This is a list of all sacred places in Israel. Judaism, Christianity, Islam, and the Bahá’í Faith recognize various sacred places within the country. The city of Jerusalem, along with its district of the same name, is home to many of these sites, being considered a holy city within Judaism, Christianity, and Islam.

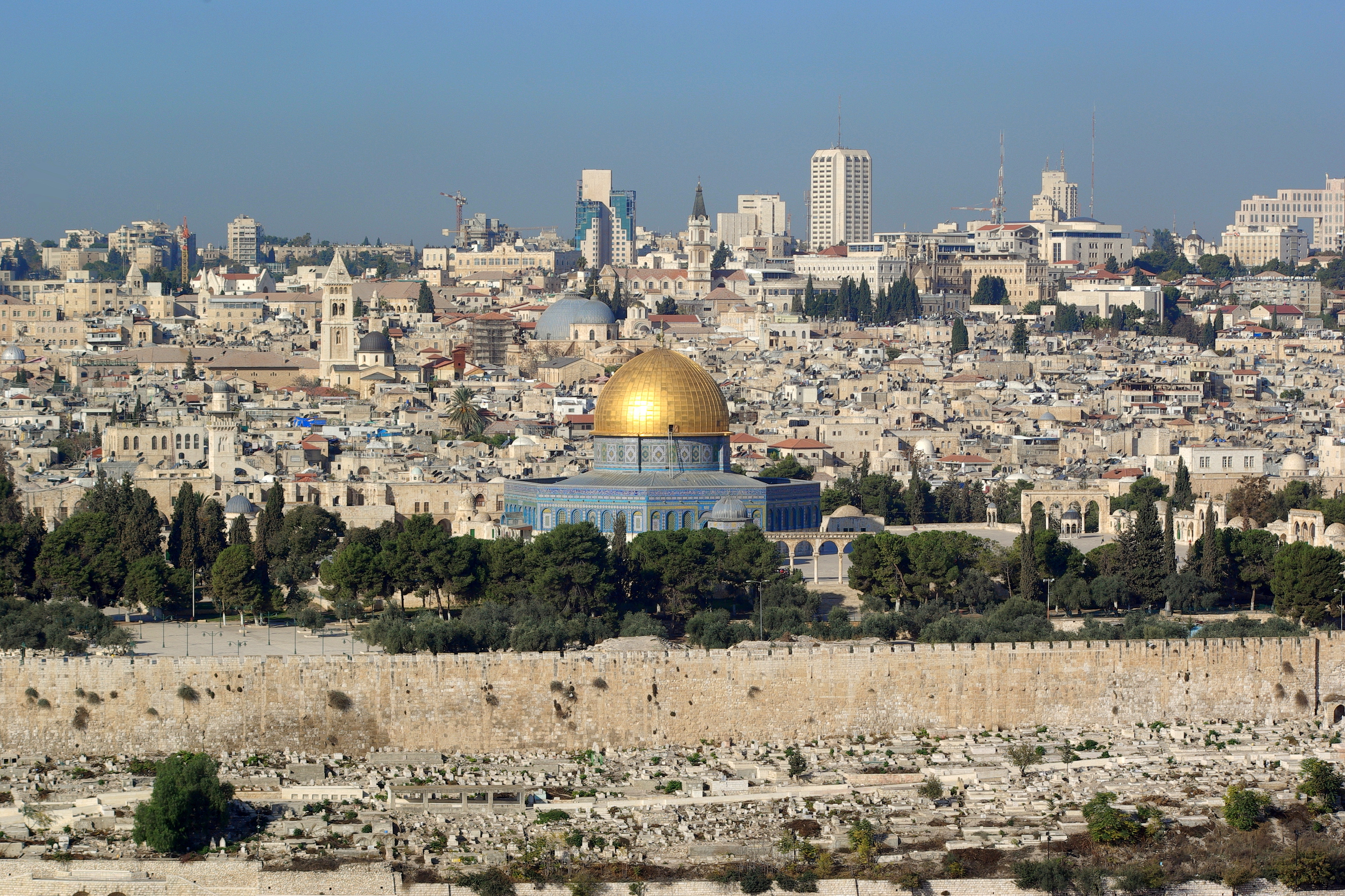
View of Jerusalem, one of the four holiest cities in all three Abrahamic religions.

== Sacred cities and towns ==
Of late Judaism's Four Holy Cities, two are undisputedly in Israel (Tiberias and Safed), with Jerusalem's status being disputed and Hebron being in the Israel-occupied West Bank.

- Jerusalem; Known as "The Holy City" or Ir ha-Kodesh in Hebrew, it is known for having holy sites for all three Abrahamic religions.
- Tiberias; one of the Four Holy Cities, a historic center of Jewish learning, and location of many rabbinic tombs.
- Safed; one of the Four Holy Cities and a major center for Kabbalah.
- Nazareth; Considered by many Christians to be the hometown of Jesus, where the Annunciation took place and where he spent much of his life.
- Capernaum; Considered by Christians to be Jesus' "second home," where he lived and preached.

== Sacred sites ==
Site	Location	Religion	Notes
Temple Mount	Jerusalem	Judaism	The single holiest site in Judaism, as it was the location of the First and Second Temples
Haram al-Sharif	Jerusalem	Islam	Third holiest site in Islam after Mecca and Medina
Western Wall	Jerusalem	Judaism	The retaining wall of the ancient Temple Mount
Mount of Olives	Jerusalem	Judaism	An ancient Jewish burial ground and site of eschatological significance
King David's Tomb	Mount Zion, Jerusalem	Judaism	Traditionally considered the burial place of King David
Tomb of Rabbi Shimon Bar Yochai	Meron	Judaism	A focus of pilgrimage during the holiday of Lag Ba'omer
Bet She'arim	Lower Galilee	Judaism	Ancient Jewish town and necropolis
Shrine of the Báb	Haifa	Bahá’í Faith	Resting place of the Báb, the forerunner of Baháʼu'lláh
Shrine of Baháʼu'lláh	Acre	Bahá’í Faith	The most holy place for Baháʼís, marking the tomb of the founder of the faith, Baháʼu'lláh
Shrine of Sheikh Abu al-Hija	Kaukab Abu al-Hija	Islam	Tomb of a Sufi saint
Cave of Elijah	Haifa	Christianity, Judaism, Islam	
Church of the Holy Sepulchre	Christian Quarter, Jerusalem	Christianity	Encompasses the traditional sites of Jesus' crucifixion
Via Dolorosa Street	Jerusalem	Christianity	Nicknamed the "Way of Suffering," it is the traditional route Jesus walked to his crucifixion, marked by the Stations of the Cross
Church of St. George/Mosque of El Khidr	Lod	Christianity, Islam	Burial place of Saint George
Basilica of the Annunciation	Nazareth	Christianity	Claimant of the site where the Angel Gabriel is said to have appeared to Mary
Greek Orthodox Church of the Annunciation	Nazareth	Christianity	Claimant of the site where the Angel Gabriel is said to have appeared to Mary
Mount Tabor	Lower Galilee	Christianity	Traditional site of the Transfiguration of Jesus
Yardenit	Jordan River	Christianity	Baptismal sites where Jesus is traditionally believed to have been baptized by John the Baptist
Abbey of the Dormition	Mount Zion, Jerusalem	Christianity	Church commemorating the spot where the Virgin Mary is believed to have died or "fallen asleep"
