= Swedish Orphan Biovitrum =

Swedish pharmaceutical company

Sobi - Swedish Orphan Biovitrum AB

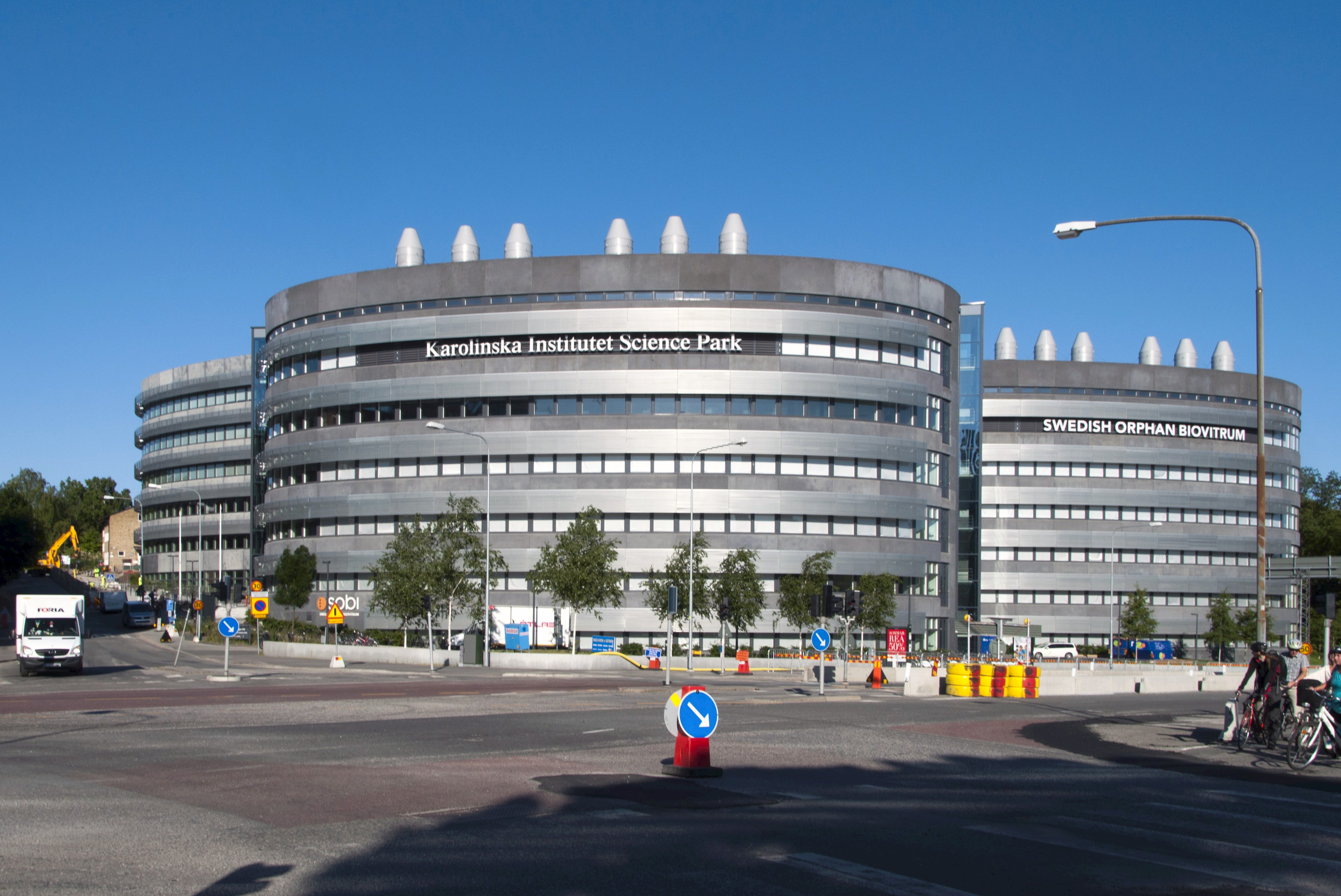
- Type: Public
- Traded as: Nasdaq Stockholm: SOBI
- Industry: Pharmaceutical
- Headquarters: Stockholm, Sweden
- Key people: Guido Oelkers (CEO); David Meek (chairman)
- Products: Treatments in the areas of haematology, immunology and specialty care
- Revenue: SEK 28.2 bn (2025)
- Operating income: SEK 22.0 bn (2025)
- Total assets: SEK 67.4 bn (2025)
- Total equity: SEK 37.7 bn (2025)
- Number of employees: ~1,900 (2025)
- Parent: Investor AB (34.7%)
- Website: sobi.com
- Footnotes; Sobi Annual and Sustainability Reports

Sobi - Swedish Orphan Biovitrum AB is an international biopharmaceutical company focused on rare diseases. The company develops, commercializes, and delivers therapies in the fields of haematology, immunology and specialty care. Headquartered in Stockholm, Sweden, with major hubs in Basel, Switzerland, and Waltham, USA.

Sobi has a global presence in approximately 30 countries and provides medicines to patients in many more around world. The company develops treatments for patients living with complex and chronic rare conditions and maintains a pipeline of development and lifecycle management programs focused on advancing innovative therapies for diseases with significant unmet medical needs.

== History ==
=== 1930s–2001 ===
The foundational roots of Swedish Orphan Biovitrum (Sobi) trace back to the 1930s, originating as a biochemical subsidiary of the Swedish brewing company Kärnbolaget Aktiebolag Biokemisk Industri.

In 1951, this subsidiary was renamed Kabi, which later merged with the pharmaceutical firm Vitrum during the 1970s to establish Kabi Vitrum. During its tenure as Kabi Vitrum, the entity became an early pioneer in the process development and commercial manufacturing of recombinant protein drugs. Kabi Vitrum's pharmaceutical legacy essentially lives on today through Sobi. Its infusion and clinical nutrition business was acquired by Fresenius in 1998, forming Fresenius Kabi.

Biovitrum, on the other hand, was established in 2001 through the merger of several units of Pharmacia (now Pfizer) and spun off to a consortium of investors led by Nordic Capital and MPM Capital Funds. Operations included a research unit focused on metabolic diseases, a process development unit for protein drugs and a plasma product operation.

=== 2002–2009 ===
In 2002 Sobi sold its plasma operation to Octapharma as part of efforts to concentrate operations on protein-based and small molecular drugs.

In 2004, Biovitrum started to manufacture the active protein component for Wyeth’s (now Pfizer’s) ReFacto® and ReFacto/Xyntha® drugs for treatment of hemophilia, and marketing of specialty pharmaceuticals (ReFacto, Mimpara and Kineret®) was initiated in the Nordic region.

In 2005, the research and development portfolio was expanded through the acquisition of Arexis, a Swedish biotech company, and the following year a partnership was formed with Syntonix (subsequently Biogen Idec) to jointly develop a drug for hemophilia B, a long-lasting recombinant factor IX Fc fusion protein candidate, rFIXFc. This partnership was extended the following year to also include the development of a long-lasting recombinant factor VIII Fc fusion protein candidate, rFVIIIFc, for the treatment of hemophilia A.

In 2008, an agreement with Amgen regarding the acquisition of the products Kepivance and Stemgen as well as a global license for Kineret was signed.

In 2009, Sobi and partner Biogen Idec took the decision to enter final registration studies for the recombinant factor FIXFc. The company also received positive data regarding its Kiobrina phase II program, an investigational enzyme replacement therapy to improve growth in preterm infants who receive pasteurized breast milk or infant formula.

=== 2010–Present ===
The modern corporate entity was officially established in 2010 when Biovitrum acquired Swedish Orphan International Holding AB, a prominent European developer of orphan drugs. Following the acquisition, the combined entity rebranded as Swedish Orphan Biovitrum AB (publ). In addition, the decisions to advance both hemophilia projects as well as Kiobrina into phase III were taken. The following year the first patient was enrolled in the phase 3 study for Kiobrina and data from the rFVIIIFc hemophilia phase I/II study were presented showing an approximately 1.7-fold increase in half-life compared with Advate. The company also established a US affiliate.

In 2012, Sobi extended its supply agreement with Pfizer for ReFacto/Xyntha until 2020 and returned the Nordic co-promotion rights for ReFacto to Pfizer. In the same year, Sobi and Biogen Idec initiated global pediatric clinical trials of their long-acting hemophilia A and B treatment candidates.

Between 2015 and 2016, Sobi secured formal EU regulatory approvals for its foundational hemophilia therapies, Elocta and Alprolix. To steer its next phase of commercial growth, the board appointed Guido Oelkers as President and Chief Executive Officer in May 2017.

== Company ==
Sobi is a global biopharmaceutical company dedicated to rare diseases with a focus on treatments in haematology, immunology and specialty care. Over the past decade, the company has grown significantly, expanding its global presence, workforce, and product portfolio. In 2025, the company's total revenue reached SEK 28,238 million, driven primarily by its haematology division.

Sobi is listed at Nasdaq Stockholm: SOBI, and develops, commercializes, and partners on innovative therapies that address high unmet medical needs, helping improve the lives of patients worldwide. Key medicines include:

- Alprolix® (eftrenonacog alfa)
- ALTUVOCT® (efanesoctocog alfa)
- Aspaveli®/Empaveli® (pegcetacoplan)
- Doptelet® (avatrombopag)
- Elocta®/Eloctate® * (efmoroctocog alfa)
- Gamifant® (emapalumab)
- Kineret® (anakinra)
- Orfadin® (nitisinone)
- Tryngolza® (olezarsen)
- VONJO® (pacritinib)
- Zynlonta® (loncastuximab tesirine)

== Acquisitions ==
- Dova Pharmaceuticals in 2019
- Through the acquisition of CTI BioPharma in 2023, Sobi expanded its haematology portfolio to include Vonjo
- In December 2025, it was announced that Sobi had agreed to acquire Arthrosi Therapeutics, a private biotechnology company developing a treatment for gout. The transaction included an upfront cash payment of $950 million and potential milestone payments of up to $550 million, adding the phase 3 investigational drug pozdeutinurad (AR882) to Sobi’s pipeline.
