= Degania =

Degania or Deganya may refer to:

- Degania Alef, initially simply Degania, the first kibbutz, founded in 1909
- Degania Bet, a kibbutz adjacent to Degania Alef, founded in 1920
- Degania Gimel, a kibbutz south of Degania Bet founded in 1920 and disbanded in 1922.
- Degania Dam on the Jordan river near Degania Alef
