= Micha Michaely =

Israeli economist (1928–2023)

Micha Micha
- מיכה מיכאלי
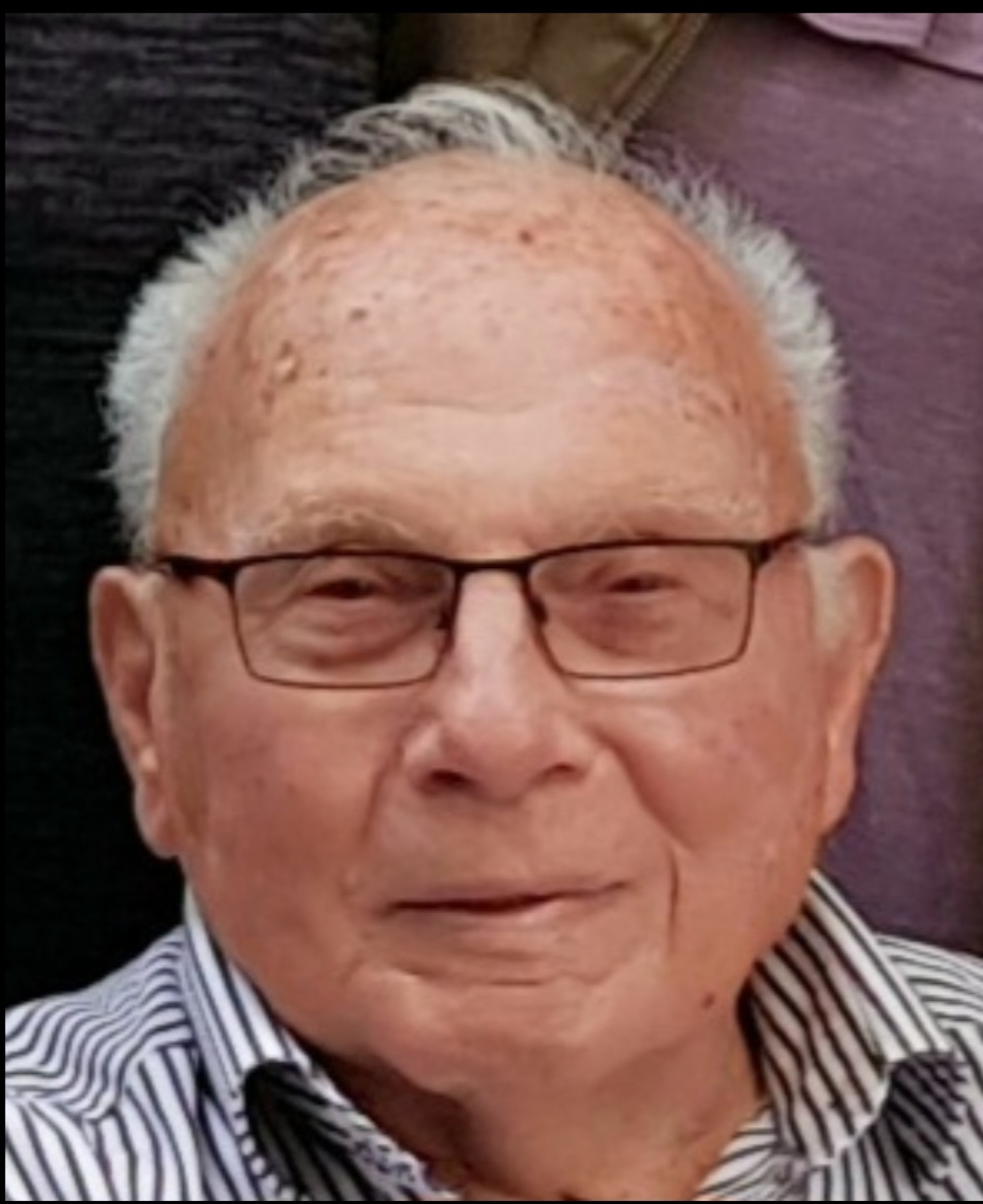

Personal details
- Born: 3 October 1928 Kvutzat Kinneret, Mandatory Palestine
- Died: 22 December 2023 (aged 95)

Micha Michaely (Hebrew: מיכה מיכאלי; 3 October 1928 – 22 December 2023) was an Israeli economist, professor in the department of economics of the Hebrew University of Jerusalem, advisor to the World Bank and president of the Israel Economic Association.

== Biography ==
Micha Michaely was born in Kvutzat Kinneret. His father, Aharon, was born in Vilnius, immigrated to Israel in 1920 and worked for Tnuva. His mother, Yona, also born in Vilnius, immigrated to Israel in 1927 and was a homemaker. As a child, he moved with his family to Jerusalem. He attended an elementary school for workers' children in Jerusalem (later renamed Berl Katznelson School), graduating in 1941, and then attended high school in Jerusalem (later renamed Urban High School C), graduating in 1945.

In 1945, after completing his high school studies, he joined the Palmach, He was in the "Etarat" training - Beit Al-Hashitya, as an adjunct, serving in Company D. During 1946-1947, he was a military officer in the Kfar Rupin department and the "caution officer" of the company. He mustered out in the summer of 1947 and re-enlisted at the beginning of December 1947, with the 6th Battalion of the Jerusalem Reserve. In the 1948 Arab–Israeli War, he participated in several operations: security of convoys on the road from Jerusalem to Tel Aviv, security of Har Tov and Gush Etzion, security of the Nabi Daniel convoy, Operation Yevusi and Operation Maccabi. He also fought in the Jerusalem Corridor and in the city itself. He was demobilized in 1949 as a platoon commander. After the establishment of the IDF, he served in the reserves until 1982 as a deputy company commander and then as a company commander in infantry. He was discharged at the rank of major.

Michaeli studied for his bachelor's and master's degrees in economics and statistics at the Hebrew University in Jerusalem, graduating in 1952. He then went for his PhD at Johns Hopkins University, graduating in 1955. His doctoral thesis dealt with dual markets where inflation prevails, under the guidance of Professor Fritz Machlop and Professor Arnold Herberger.

In 1955 he returned to Israel and joined the Hebrew University as a researcher and lecturer in the Department of Economics and specialized in international economics. In 1968 he was appointed a full professor, retiring in 1988. After his retirement he continued to write and publish. In 2020, his last book was published.

== Career ==
=== Research ===
Michaely published a dozen books as well as many articles in leading economic journals in a number of topics such as: setting prices in parallel markets (the black market), the concentration of international trade, the contribution of export growth to the growth of the economy - his studies were cornerstones for discussions in economic literature. In other areas, such as: the extension of the LM-IS model (a model that unifies the analyzes of the goods and money markets) to an open economy, the monetary theory of the balance of payments, or the analysis of customs unions - his studies were central to discussions in the economic literature. He was a leading partner in conducting a multinational study on the trade liberalization process, which resulted in a seven-volume publication and was a founding co-editor of the Journal of International Economics.

He was a visiting professor at many universities and research institutes in the United States, Sweden and Australia, including: The National Bureau of Economic Research, Stanford University and the University of Chicago.

A significant part of his research work dealt with Israel's economy. Among other things, he was a pioneer in the analysis of economic independence, the effect of capital imports on the structure of the economy, and the estimation and analysis of the exchange rate system in Israel.

=== The Development of Economic Studies in Israel ===
Michaeli was one of the first generation of economists who worked at the Hebrew University. In the years 1961-1965, he served as the head of the Economics Department, played a central role in the further establishment of economics studies at the university, and continued the path of Prof. Don Patinkin in determining contents and action frameworks. As the founder of the "branch" of the university in Tel Aviv, he also contributed, in the end, to the creation of the basis for the establishment of the Department of Economics at Tel Aviv University. In the years 1968-1971 he served as Dean of the Faculty of Social Sciences at the Hebrew University, and also led to the establishment of Business Administration studies within the faculty.

=== Public Activity ===
Michaeli played a central role, sometimes in partnership with his colleague Prof. Haim Barkai, in creating the involvement of the academic faculty in the determination of current Israeli economic policy - through frequent meetings of the faculty members with the heads of government, including Levy Eshkol as Minister of Finance and Golda Meir and Yitzhak Rabin as Prime Ministers, as well as other major officials in the economy. He also frequently appeared before the various Knesset committees. He was also a pioneer in public activity: holding study evenings, meetings with members of the media, and more. For example, he founded the "Economic Team", a group of 5 members, which published a weekly column in the Maariv newspaper, for several years. He was a member of the Higher Education Council (HEC), and within this framework he served as the chairman of several committees. In 1983-1984 he served as the third president of the Israel Economic Association (after Dan Patinkin and Michael Bruno).

=== Activity at the World Bank ===
Between 1986-1993 Michaeli worked at the World Bank in Washington, United States as a senior consultant. During these years, in addition to managing the multinational research already mentioned, Michaeli was responsible for managing the bank's research in several key countries in Latin America (including Brazil). In the countries of this region, he met frequently for consultation with policy leaders, such as prime ministers, finance ministers and central bank governors, as well as heads of other bodies, such as trade unions. Later, he acted for several years as an external consultant to the bank, mainly in the context of the countries of the former Soviet Union. One of his achievements in this field was his success in influencing the introduction of an independent currency system in Armenia, to replace the use of the Russian ruble.

=== Development of Economic Studies Outside of Israel ===
Michaeli played a central role in creating and chairing international advisory committees within the framework of the establishment and management of graduate study programs (Master's and Master's degrees) in the English language in Ukraine and Georgia.

=== Awards ===
In June 2023, Michaeli received a certificate of appreciation for the David Horowitz Lifetime Achievement Award for his life's work in researching and studying economics from the Israel Economic Association.

== Personal life ==
In 1952 Michaely married Ora Avni (Steiner), who worked as a bookkeeper, and together they had three sons.

He lived in Mevaseret Zion until his death on 22 December 2023, at the age of 95.

== Selected publications ==
- Concertation in International Trade, Amsterdam: North-Holland, 1962
- Balance-of-Payment Adjustment Policies: Japan, Germany and the Netherlands, New York: National Bureau of Economic Research, 1968
- Israel's Foreign Exchange Rate System, Jerusalem: Falk Institute for Economic Research in Israel. English – 1971
- The Responsiveness of Demand Politics to Balance-of-Payments: Postwar Patterns, New York: Columbia University Press for the National Bureau of Economic Research, 1971.
- Foreign-Trade Regimes and Economic Development: Israel, New York: Columbia University Press for the National Bureau of Economic Research, 1975.
- Theory of Commercial Policy: Trade and Protection, Oxford: Philip Allan, and Chicago: University of Chicago Press, 1977
- Trade, Income Levels and Dependence, Amsterdam: North-Holland, 1984
- Liberalizing Foreign Trade: Lessons of Experience in the Developing world, Oxford: Basil Blackwell, 1991 (with Demetris Papageorgiou and Armeane M. Choksi)
- Trade Liberalization and Trade Preferences, Aldershot: Ashgate, 2004
- Trade Liberalization and Trade Preferences, (Revised Edition), Singapore, New Jersey, and London: World Scientific Press, 2009
- Trade Among Nations, Singapore, New Jersey and London: World Scientific Press, 2020 (with David Wijnryt)
