= Kvutzat Kinneret =

Kibbutz in northern Israel

Kvutzat Kinneret: קְבוּצַת כִּנֶּרֶת (Hebrew)
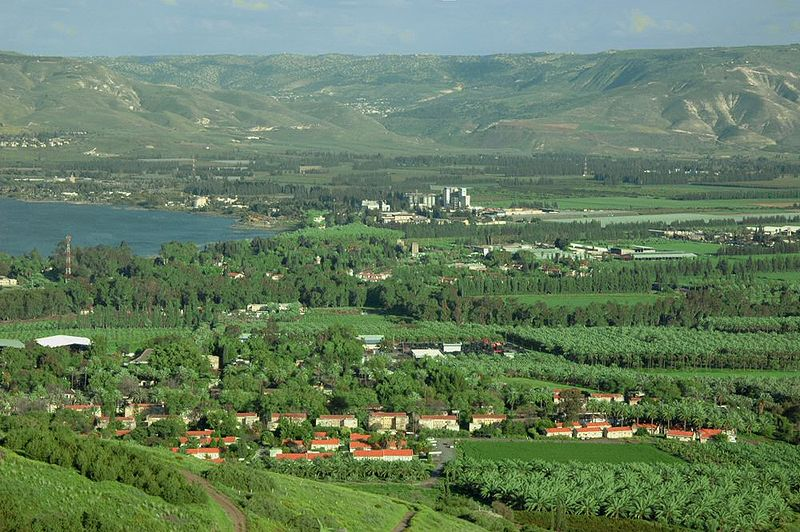
- Kvutzat Kinneret (foreground) from west, overlooking the Sea of Galilee and the Jordan Valley and opposite the Golan Heights (background)

- Location within Northeast Israel Location within Israel
- Coordinates: 32°42′48″N 35°33′45″E
- Country: Israel
- District: Northern
- Subdistrict: Kinneret
- Council: Emek HaYarden
- Affiliation: Kibbutz Movement
- Founded: 1913
- Founder: Ashkenazi and Yemenite Jewish refugees
- Population (2024): 815

Kvutzat Kinneret (Hebrew: קְבוּצַת כִּנֶּרֶת), also known as Kibbutz Kinneret, is a kibbutz in northern Israel. The settlement group (kvutza) was established in 1913, and moved from the Kinneret training farm to the permanent location in 1929. Located to the southwest of the Sea of Galilee near Tiberias and next to Moshavat Kinneret, it falls under the jurisdiction of Emek HaYarden Regional Council. In 2024 it had a population of 815.

== Etymology ==
The name Kinneret derives from an ancient Canaanite town of Kinneret close to the northern end of the lake's western shore. According to the Hebrew Bible, the town of Kinneret was part of the allotment of the tribe of Naphtali (Joshua 19:35). The site of the modern kibbutz was probably also part of Naphtali, or (depending on interpretation) of Issachar or Zebulun. In the Bible, the Sea of Galilee is called Yam Kinneret, lit. Sea of Kinneret.

== History ==
=== Beginnings ===
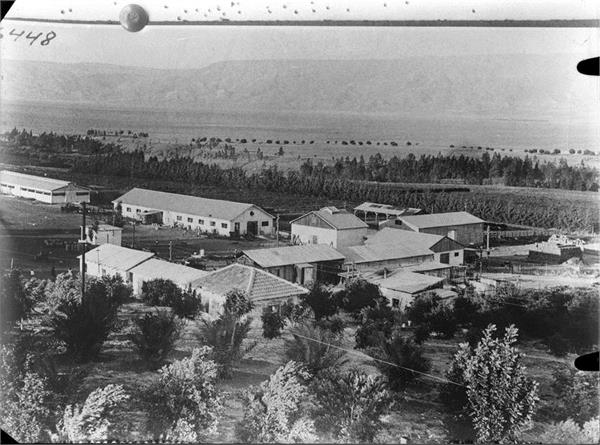
Kvutzat Kinneret 1937

Kvutzat Kinneret, like Degania Alef, evolved from the agricultural training farm founded in 1908 known as Havat Kinneret (Kinneret Farm) or Hatzer Kinneret (Kinneret Courtyard). The kvutza, or 'group', was established within the Kinneret Farm in 1913 by a small number of idealistic pioneers who believed in the communal way of life and sharing all material goods. In 1929, the group settled at their current, permanent location higher up the hill. Kinneret is the only kibbutz west of the Jordan River that settled on the rocky slopes rather than the valley. Beekeeping and the sale of honey were among the earliest economic branches.

The early settlers planted date palms but found that the dates were of inferior quality. In the 1930s, 75,000 high-quality date palm saplings were smuggled out of Iraq aboard a ship supposedly heading for Italy. The cargo was transported across the Shatt al-Arab waterway to the Iranian side, and from there through the Suez Canal to Cyprus, where it was put on board a ship to Haifa.

=== Yemenite group ===
In 1912, the pioneers at the Kinneret Farm and Degania were joined by ten Yemenite Jewish families who worked in draining swamps, as also in growing vegetables. Because of cultural differences between the Yemenite and Ashkenazi workers, the former were lodged in the two noisy and oil fumes-filled storage rooms of the so-called "motor house" of the water pumping station, received less than half the land and earned half the wages of Ashkenazi workers, and were not invited to join the kvutza. Once the kvutza leadership decided that they must leave, water was withheld from them, as was milk for their children. Due to the poor living and working conditions, many children and adults died, not least of malaria. In 1930, after eighteen years at the site, they were finally compelled to leave the area. The ten families resettled in Kfar Marmorek (see photo), then a new workers' moshav and now a suburb of Rehovot. Although they had contributed a great deal to develop the area, the Arabic-speaking, religiously observant Yemenites were not considered suitable to join the kibbutz. Once the Motor House was transformed into a museum in 1994, a plaque placed there and commemorating the Yemenite pioneers was removed by kibbutz members; the ensuing legal battle was ongoing as of 2009.

== "Motor House" pumping station ==
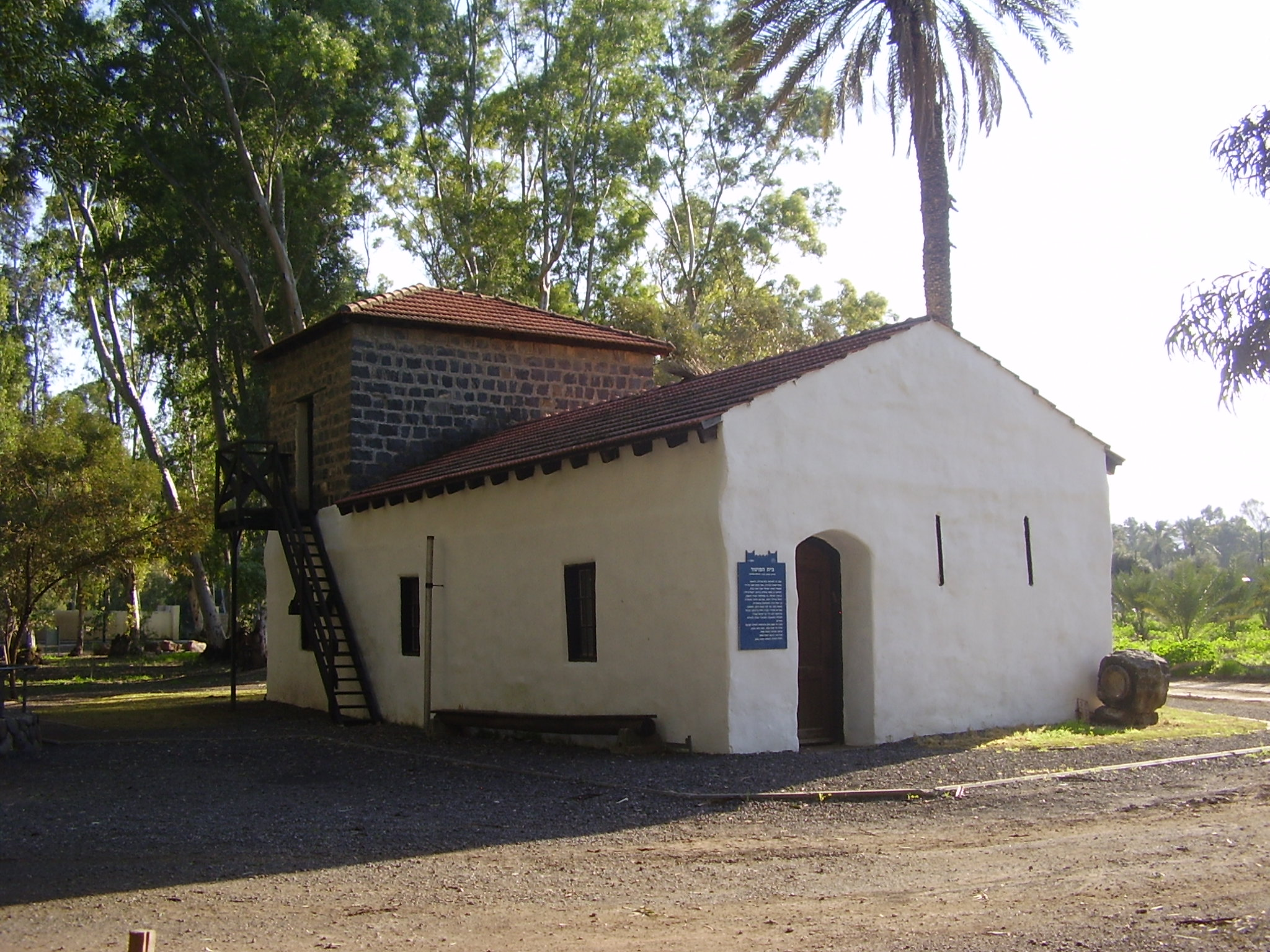
"Motor House", Kvuzat Kinneret

The Motor House (Beit HaMotor) was constructed in 1910 to house a water pump used to draw water for irrigation; it was the first pumping station in Palestine. The Motor House is located at the base of the hill, among Kinneret's orchards and fields, across the road from the Yardenit baptismal site.

== Kinneret Cemetery ==
Downhill from Kvutzat Kinneret and immediately southeast of Moshavat Kinneret, on the nearby shore of the lake, is the historic Kinneret Cemetery. It was used for burials not only by the inhabitants of the moshava, the kibbutz, and the training farm which all share the same name, Kinneret, but also for pioneers and leaders of the wider Labour Zionist movement. In 1964, Dov Ber Borochov (1881—1917), founder of Labour Zionism, was reinterred after his remains were transferred from Ukraine.

== Notable people ==
- Shaul Avigur (1899–1978), one of the founders of the Israeli Intelligence Community
- Liel Kolet (born 1989), pop singer
- Shlomo Lavi (1882–1963), Zionist activist and politician (before moving to Ein Harod)
- Tzurit Or (1973-), founder of the American restaurant chain Tatte Bakery & Café
- Naomi Shemer (1930–2004), songwriter, the "First Lady of Israeli song and poetry"
- Shmuel Stoller (1898–1977), agronomist, co-founder of the kibbutz, Israel Prize laureate

== Gallery ==
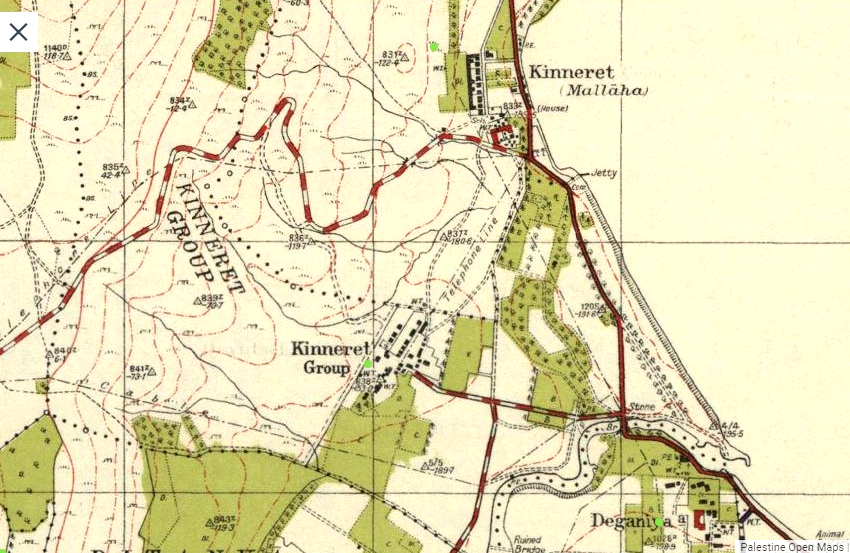
"Kinneret Group" (settlement and lands) on British Survey of Palestine map, ca. 1941

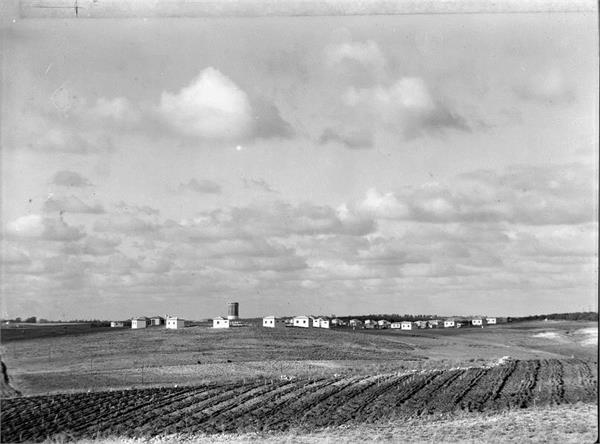
Kfar Marmorek 1935

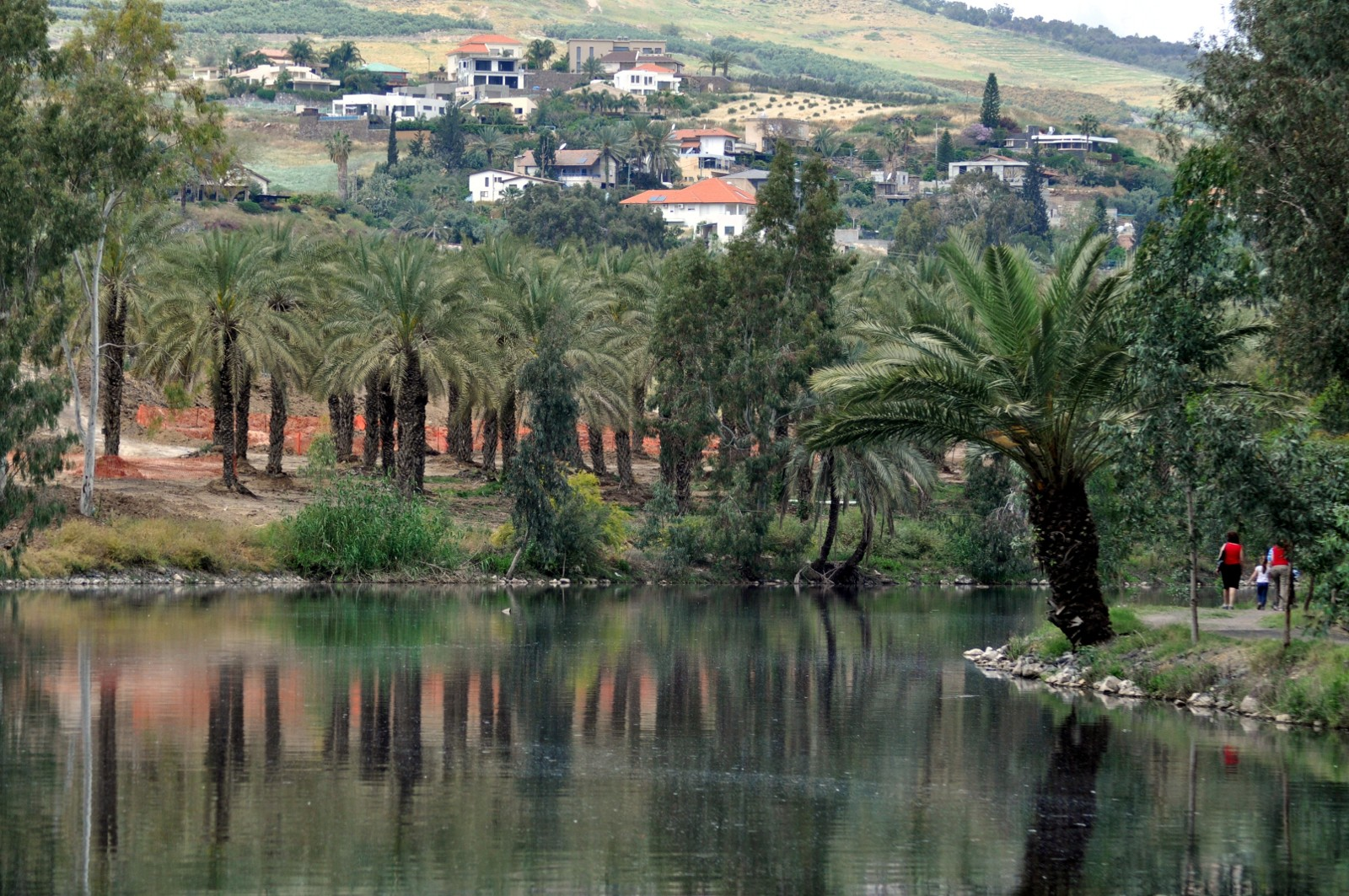
Water reservoirs, Kvutzat Kinneret

== See also ==
- Kinneret (disambiguation)
- Second Aliyah, 1904-1914 Jewish emigration wave to the Land of Israel
- Yardenit, Christian baptism site established by Kvutzat Kinneret on the River Jordan
