= Liel Kolet =

Liel Kolet ליאל קולט
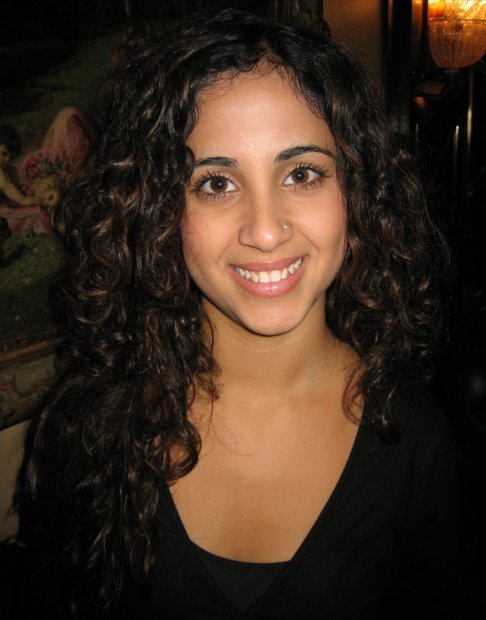

Background information
- Born: 11 July 1989 (age 35); Kvutzat Kinneret, Israel
- Genres: Pop
- Occupation(s): Singer, songwriter
- Instrument: Vocals
- Years active: 2000–present

Liel Kolet (Hebrew: ליאל קולט) is an Israeli singer-songwriter and a peace advocate.

== Biography ==
Liel Kolet is an international singer, songwriter and a peace advocate. Born on 11 July 1989 to Jewish Israeli parents on Kibbutz Kinneret, she was raised in an idyllic environment and lived a very simple life.

At age 11, Liel won a talent contest in Israel called Bravo, performing a song originally sung by Israeli singer Ofra Haza called "Leorech Hayam". After winning the national contest she represented Israel in the European talent contest Bravo Bravissimo, where she also won. Among the many people touched by her performance was Liel's soon-to-be manager. He soon signed her and helped develop Liel's career.

At the age 13 she recorded her first studio album, Daughter of the Kinneret. It included songs such as "Prayer", "Eyfo Ata Achi" (Where Are You Now My Brother), a song dedicated to families whose lost sons to Israel's wars, and "Don't Be a Hero", a duet with Sasi Buganim. It also included her first English song: "Find it in Me".

When Liel was 14 she performed at the 80th birthday celebration of president Shimon Peres. She invited President Bill Clinton to join her on stage and sing John Lennon's "Imagine" with a choir of 40 Jewish and 40 Muslim children. This performance made a worldwide impact as the video has been shown on major TV shows and channels all over the globe. This was Liel's first step into the International music scene, making her a "highly sought after personality" for royal events, peace concerts and charity events throughout the world.

A year later Liel began to work with German producer Jack White who produced her first international record called Simply Me. Kolet promoted the album by performing on some of the biggest TV shows in Germany such as; Verstehen Sie Spass?, Ein Herz für Kinder and many more. Later on, she received the German Radio Award for her work to promote peace and support children in need around the world.

At a 2006 aid concert for tsunami victims in Berlin, Liel performed "Imagine" again, but this time with the Scorpions' lead singer Klaus Meine who joined her for an impromptu duet. The two clicked immediately, and shortly after, Meine invited her to perform with him. Together they recorded five duets, including a special version of "Send Me an Angel", which became a big hit and ended up on her album, a special version of David D'or's song, "Tishmor al HaOlam Yeled" ("Keep the World Child"), and a new song which Meine wrote for Liel, "Bigger Than Life". Together, they also performed one of the most well-known Israeli songs, written by one of the best-known poets and songwriters of Israel, Naomi Shemer: "Jerusalem of Gold".

In 2006 Liel released her first international album- "Unison" which has a blend of pop-classical songs and a touch of ethnic flavor. Sung in both English and Spanish, it was also released in Mexico where she appeared on some of the biggest TV shows such as The Telethon as well as on various radio shows and even the news. Liel sold over 40,000 copies in Mexico City.

After gaining recognition in Europe, Liel was approached by leading producer Ralph Siegel who asked her to represent Switzerland in the Eurovision Song Contest, as part of an international group called Six4one, a group formed of different singers from different nationalities who came together to support the message of peace and unity.

In 2007 Israeli Prime Minister Ehud Olmert nominated Liel as Official Ambassador for Northern Israel. She has also served as official ambassador for The Peres Center for Peace, the Sheba Medical Center, the Children's Hospital, the Seeds of Peace and Children of Peace.

In 2008, Liel performed at the 10th anniversary of the Peres Center for Peace. Leading the musical part of the evening, her most memorable moment was when she sang a duet with Andrea Bocelli called "Ray of Hope" which was written by Shimon Peres and composed by Kolet.

In 2009, Liel released her second album, "Be Free," of pop-classical songs and strong ballads, containing some of her own writing. The album featured collaborations with some of the biggest names in the music industry. She recorded a duet called "For the Love of God" with Patti LaBelle. She also performed a live version of "What a Wonderful World with legendary Jazz musician Herbie Hancock. She released "Be Free" in Israel, Europe and Mexico.

On 9 October 2012 Liel took part in an historic international event honoring the Dalai Lama. Performing before the world media at the Carrier Dome in Syracuse, New York, Liel sang for the Dalai Lama and appeared alongside Dave Matthews Band, Whoopi Goldberg, David Crosby and other international stars.

In 2013 Liel received The Eagle of Peace award, for her humanitarian work and promotion of peace through her music. At the same event she performed in a unique collaboration with Iranian singer Ebi. They performed "I Can Hear Christmas." The song was produced by the Grammy Award Winner producer Humberto Gatica. She also had her first PBS special aired in the United States, called ‘My Journey to Peace.’ The special was broadcast throughout the United States, bringing Liel's story into the homes of the American People, sharing her continuous mission to use her voice to promote peace. Following the PBS special, Liel toured the Eastern United States.

== Discography ==
- Kineret Child, An Israeli Album (2003)
- Too Young to Love, single (25 October 2004)
- Jerusalem, single (2004)
- Jerusalem – With Klaus Meine and Matthias Jabs (Scorpions), single (2004)
- I'd Rather be Alone with You, single (9 May 2005)
- High Energy, single (22 August 2005)
- See On Me (רואים עליי In Hebrew)
- Hava Nagila, Single
- Simply Me, album (October 2005)
- Send Me an Angel – With Klaus Meine (Scorpions), Single
- Lost in You, Single
- Bigger Than Life – With Klaus Meine (Scorpions), Single
- Unison, Album.
- If We All Give A Little – With Six4One
- Elohim Sheli (also known as "Ratziti Sheteda", or "I wanted you to know", or "My God"), Single
- Be Free , album
- Save Yourself, album
- I Can Hear Christmas – with Ebi , Single (2013)

== Awards ==
- German Radio Award 2005
