= Degania Dam =

Dam in Degania Alef, Israel

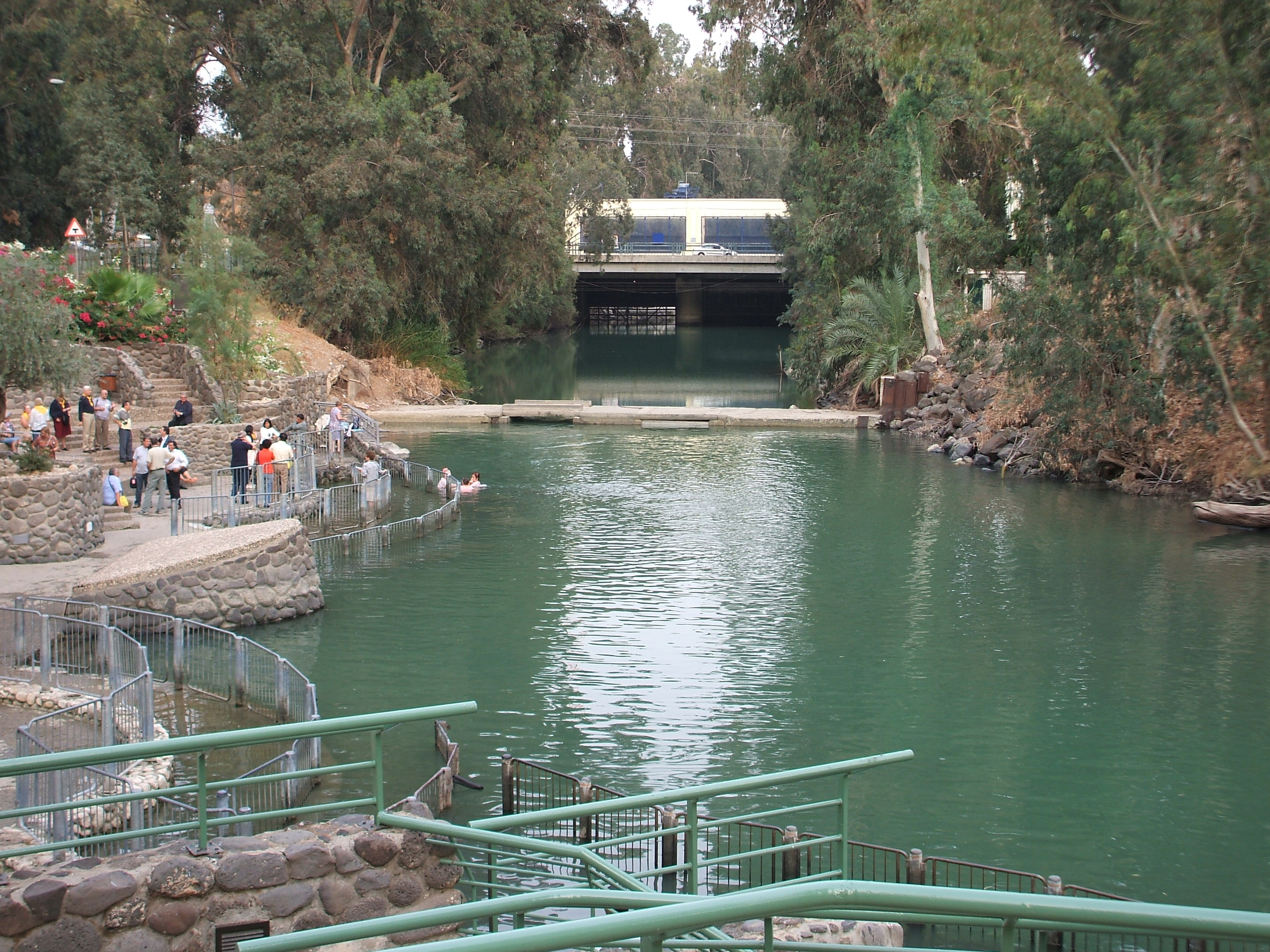
- Degania Dam (behind Yardenit baptism site, the almost fully submerged dam in the foreground, and the traffic bridge)

- Location within Israel
- Country: Israel
- Location: Degania Alef
- Coordinates: 32°42′41.65″N 35°34′23.35″E
- Purpose: Regulation
- Status: Operational
- Opening date: 1964; 62 years ago

Dam and spillways
- Type of dam: Barrage
- Impounds: Jordan River
- Spillway type: Two floodgates
- Spillway capacity: 800 m^{3}/s (28,000 cu ft/s)

The Degania Dam is a small barrage across the Jordan River just below the Sea of Galilee near Degania Alef and Yardenit in northern Israel. The purpose of the dam is to regulate water levels in the Sea of Galilee and flows into the lower Jordan River. It has two floodgates capable of releasing 800 m^{3}/s (28,000 cu ft/s).

== History ==
The dam was completed in the early 1930s as part of Pinhas Rutenberg's Naharayim hydroelectric power plant project. The power plant's activity was discontinued as a result of the 1948 Arab-Israeli war. Mekorot National Water Company inaugurated its National Water Carrier in 1964, which gave a new purpose to the dam, of reducing and regulating the water flow from the Sea of Galilee to the Jordan River, thus allowing the lake to fulfill its purpose of being the water reservoir of the country and the main source of water pumped into the national carrier. Since the start of large-scale seawater desalination in the 2000s, the lake's role as a water source has constantly decreased, again partially changing the purpose of the dam.

For years the Degania Dam has constantly allowed small quantities of water to flow from the lake into the river, for the benefit of downstream agriculture and the Yardenit baptism site. However, for a few times it was opened more generously, such as in 1995 and then again only in May 2013, when the water level in the lake had reached dangerously high levels close to the "upper red line" after heavy spring flooding.

The river is dammed again some three kilometres south of the Sea of Galilee and Degania Dam by an embankment called "Alumot Dam", where the fresh water section ends as treated wastewater and brackish water are added to the mix. There are government-sponsored projects under way since 2013 to change the entire water economy of the Lower Jordan, including an increase in the quantity of fresh water passing through Degania Dam from the lake into the river.
