= Ginosar (disambiguation) =

Ginosar is a toponym from northern Israel, which apparently evolved from "Kinneret". It has also been adopted as a surname, usually transliterated Ginossar.

Ginosar, Ginossar, Ginnosar, or Gennesaret may refer to:

== Places ==
- Kinneret (archaeological site), ancient city, later known as Ginosar (possibly a Grecised version of the name). Also spelled Ginnosar and Ginossar, variant: Gennesaret (previously Kinnereth, Chinnereth or Chinneroth).
  - Lake of Gennesaret, Sea of Chinnereth or Kinneret etc., more usually known as the Sea of Galilee
  - Plain of Ginosar and all above-mentioned variants, dominated by and named after the city; see: Kinneret (archaeological site): The plain
- Ginosar (kibbutz), modern settlement in the Plain of Ginosar, northern Israel

== People ==
- Eldad Ginossar (born 1981), Israeli bridge player
- Rosa Ginossar (1890–1979), first female lawyer in Israel and women's rights activist
- Shlomo Ginossar (1889–1969), Israeli ambassador to Italy

== See also ==
- Kinneret (disambiguation page)
