= Kinneret =

Kinneret (alternatively Kinnereth and Chinnereth) is the English transliteration for Kineret, the Hebrew name of the Sea of Galilee, the largest freshwater lake in Israel.

Other meanings of Kinneret and Kineret include:

== Places ==
- Camp Kinneret, a summer camp of Canadian Young Judaea
- Kinneret (archaeological site), a biblical city which gave the Sea of Galilee its Hebrew name; now Tell el-'Oreimeh or Tel Kinrot
- Kinneret Farm, an experimental training farm (1908-1949), now a museum
- Kinneret Subdistrict, Israel
- Kvutzat Kinneret, a kibbutz southwest of the Sea of Galilee
- Moshavat Kinneret, a village (moshava) southwest of the Sea of Galilee

== People ==
- Kineret (singer), Orthodox Jewish singer, songwriter and producer Kineret Sarah Cohen (born 1970)
- Kinneret Keren (born 1972), Israeli biophysicist and nanotechnologist
- Kinneret Klein (born 2002), American musician
- Kinneret Shiryon (born 1955), Reform rabbi, the first female rabbi in Israel
- Kinneret Wallach (born c. 1973), Israeli former wheelchair tennis and basketball player

== Other uses ==
- Kinneret College, a college south of the Sea of Galilee
- Kinneret Day School, a Jewish day school in Riverdale, New York, United States
- Kineret (medication), brand name of anakinra; no direct relation to the lake
- Kinneret Zmora-Bitan Dvir, publishing company, Israel
- Kinneret, Israeli song based on Rachel Bluwstein's poem "Perhaps" ("Ve'Ulai")
- Kinneret bream or Kinneret bleak, Acanthobrama terraesanctae, fish endemic to the Sea of Galilee and a lake in Syria
- Operation Kinneret, another name for the Israeli military Operation Olive Leaves

== See also ==
- Ginosar (disambiguation), a toponym which apparently evolved from "Kinneret"
