= Kinneret Wallach =

Israeli wheelchair tennis player

- Native name: כנרת וואלך
- Country (sports): Israel
- Born: Ein Gev, Israel

Singles
- Paralympic Games: 1/16th final (1996)

Doubles
- Paralympic Games: Quarterfinal (1996)

Kinneret Wallach (Hebrew: כנרת וואלך) is an Israeli former wheelchair tennis and wheelchair basketball player.

== Biography ==
Wallach was born in Ein Gev and in 1989, aged sixteen, she was paralyzed following a traffic collision.

As a wheelchair tennis player she was ranked in the top 50 and gained criteria to compete at the 1996 Summer Paralympics. She did not pass the preliminary competition in the Singles' Tournament but reached the quarterfinal in the Doubles' Tournament, competing alongside Tikva Aharoni.

Wallach also competed in wheelchair basketball, cited by paralympic athlete Nina Gorodetzky as her role model. Wallach played in male teams and as of 2024 she is on the roster of Beit HaLochem's team in Tel Aviv.

Wallach is an activist for promoting accessibility and equal rights for the disabled, taking part in the early 2000s in demonstrations and demand of changes in legislation. She was interviewed regularly on Gabi Gazit's radio show promoting awareness on issues of accessibility. Professionally, Wallach attributes herself as an advisor on wheelchair use.

In 2012 Wallach competed on MasterChef Israel and an accessible cooking station was built for her.
