= Yardenit =

Baptism site located along the Jordan river

Coordinates: 32°42′40″N 35°34′17″E

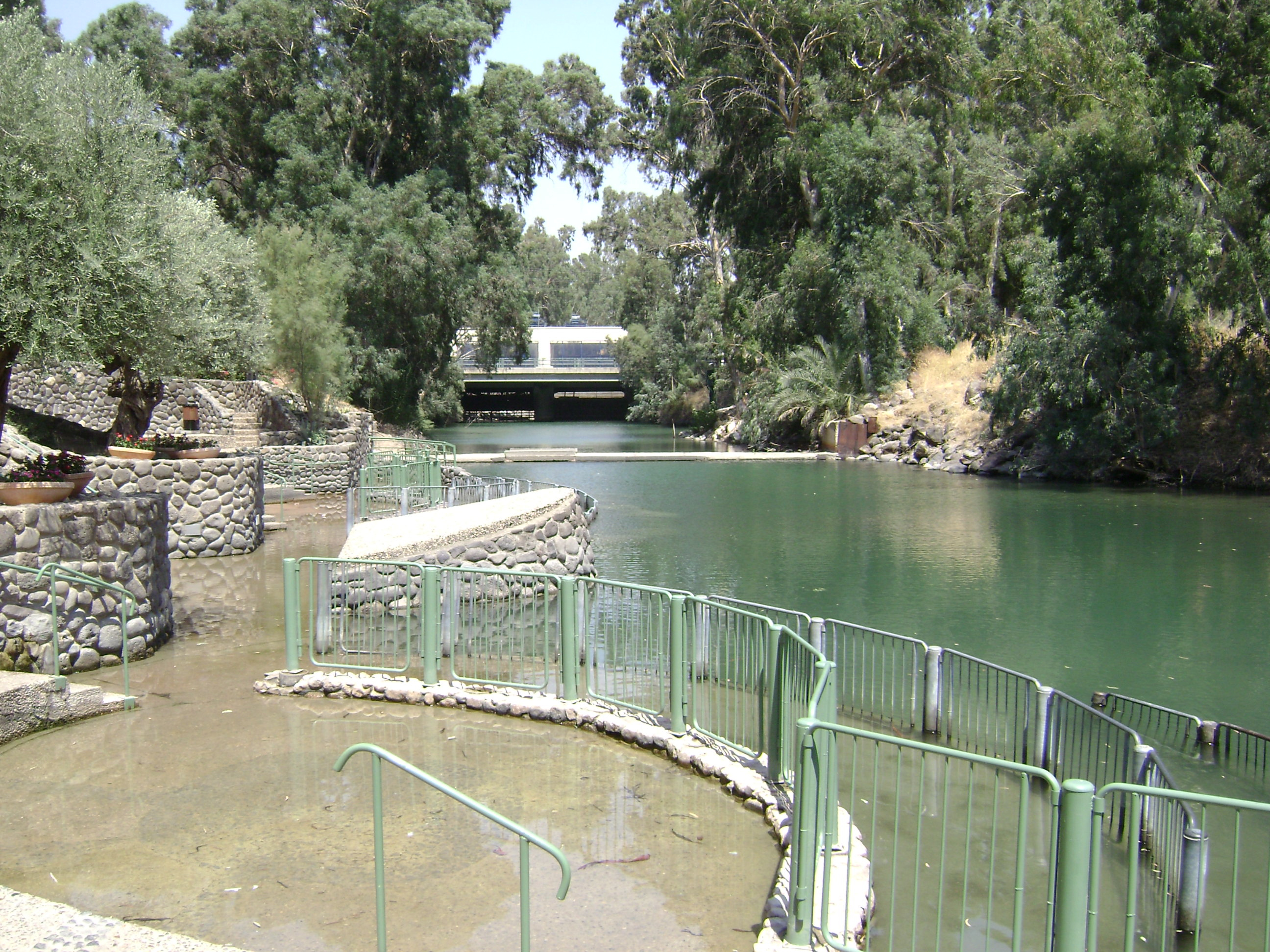
The Yardenit Baptismal Site near Bet Yerah

Yardenit (Hebrew: ירדנית), also known as the Yardenit Baptismal Site, is a baptism site located along the Jordan River in the Galilee region of northern Israel, which is frequented by Christian pilgrims. The site is located south of the river's outlet from the Sea of Galilee, near Kibbutz Kvutzat Kinneret, which owns and manages the site.

== History ==
According to Christian tradition, the baptism of Jesus (Matthew 3:13-17) took place in Bethany Beyond the Jordan (Al-Maghtas), north of the Dead Sea and east of Jericho. For centuries, al-Maghtas was the most important baptism site for pilgrims, and monasteries and guest houses were established near it. Today in Jordan, Al-Maghtas shows early religious structures connected with baptism or religious baths.

Since the Six-Day War, Israel has occupied the west margin of the Jordan river, including the area immediately opposite the Jordanian site, known as Qasr al-Yahud. Due to military activity and excavations in that area of the West Bank, however, the Israeli Ministry of Tourism established Yardenit in 1981 as an alternative pilgrimage site. Yardenit became the first regulated baptism site in Israel.

Yardenit thus attracted pilgrims and a visitor center was built.

== Gallery ==
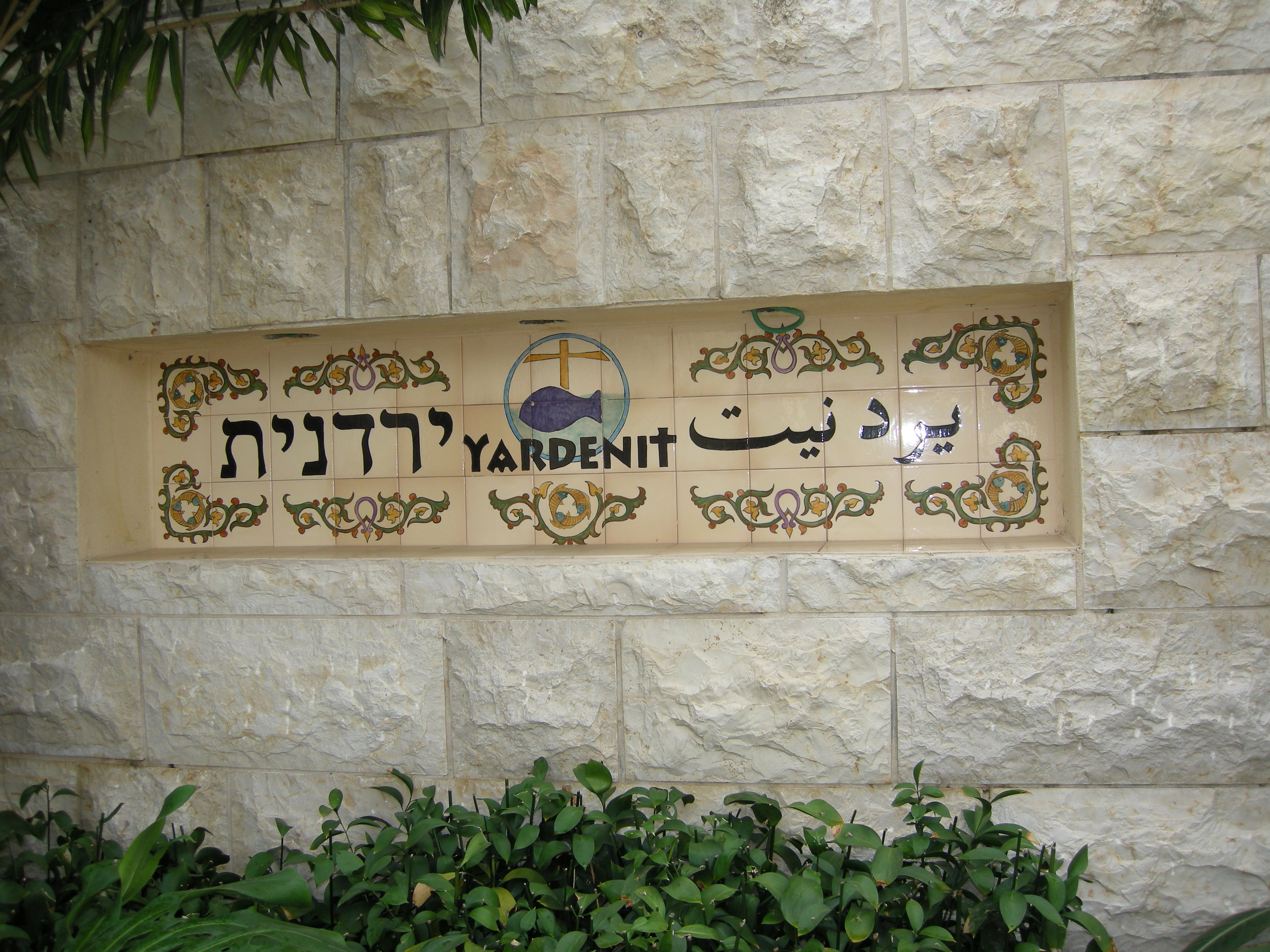
Entrance plaque

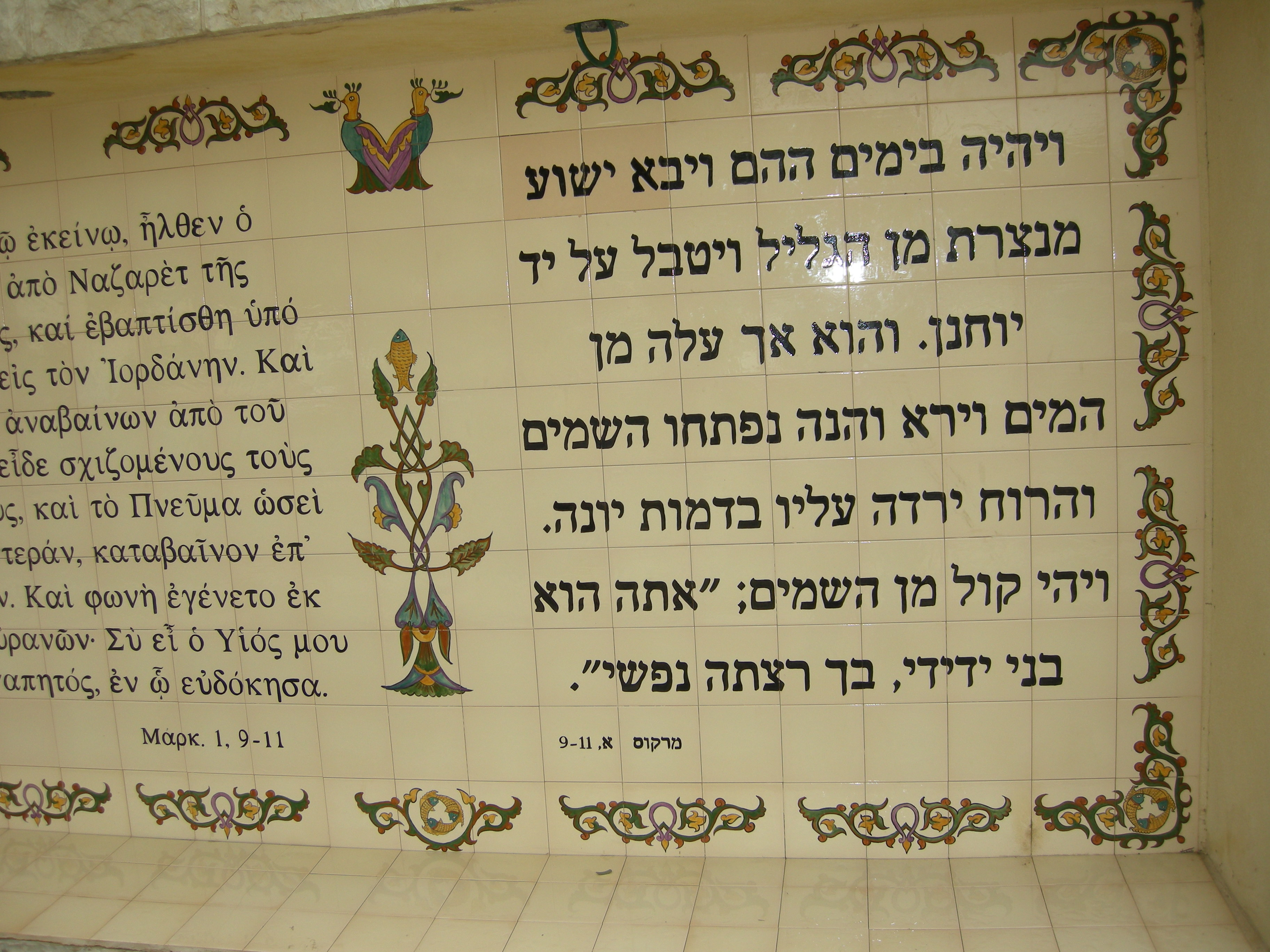
New Testament verse about the baptism of Jesus

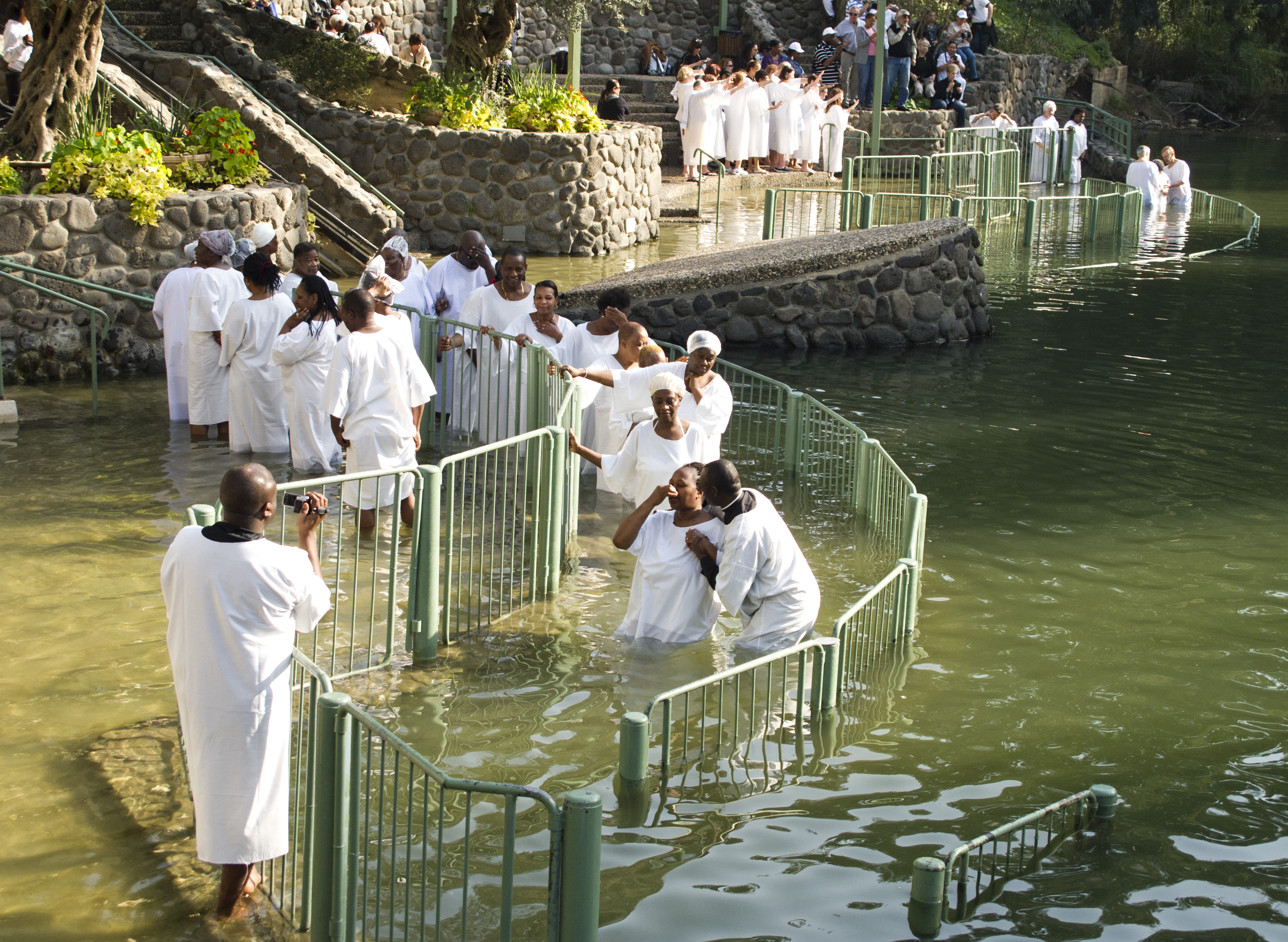
Baptism ceremony at Yardenit

== See also ==
- John the Baptist
- Qasr el Yahud
- Tourism in Israel
- Christianity in Israel
