= Sea of Galilee =

Freshwater lake in Israel

- ים כנרת (Hebrew); بحيرة طبريا (Arabic)
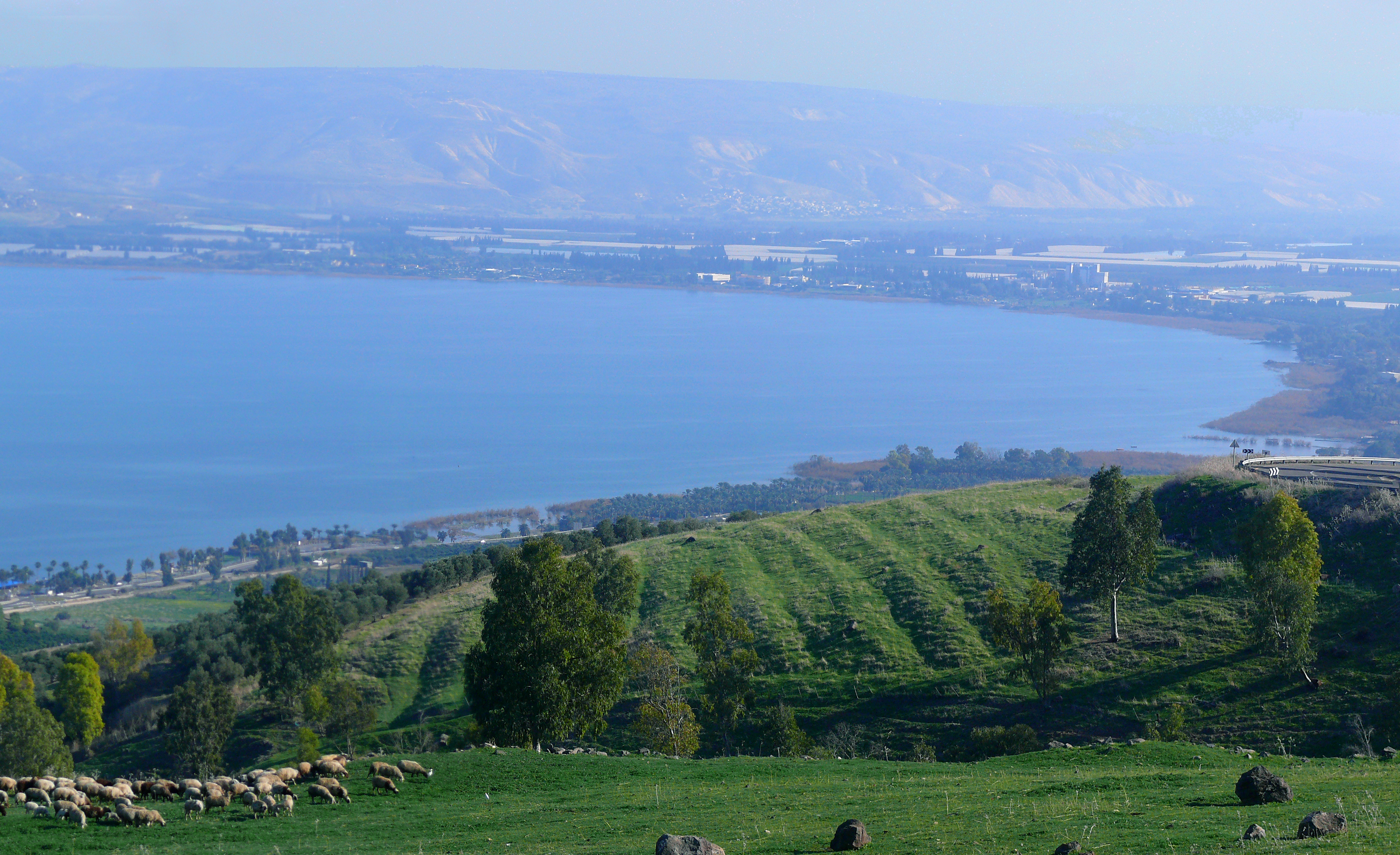

- Location within Israel Location within Middle East

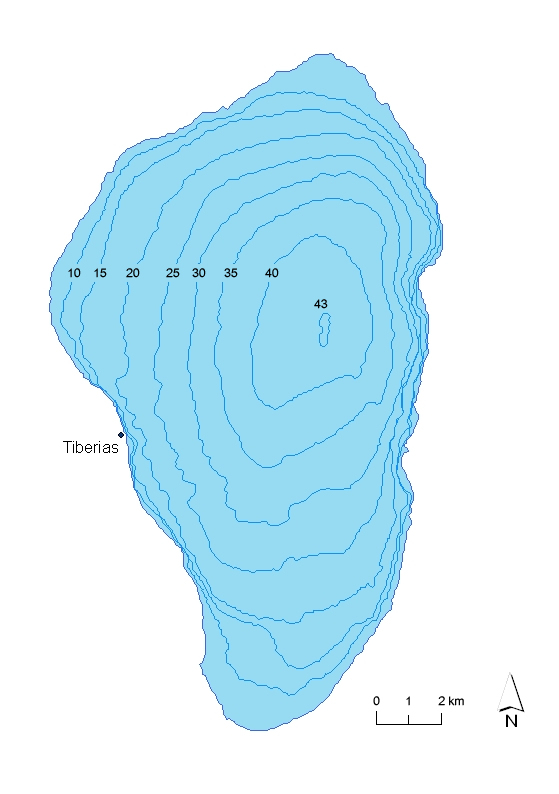
- Coordinates: 32°50′N 35°35′E
- Lake type: Monomictic
- Primary inflows: Upper Jordan River and local runoff
- Primary outflows: Lower Jordan River, evaporation
- Catchment area: 2,730 km^{2} (1,050 sq mi)
- Basin countries: Israel, Syria, Lebanon
- Max. length: 21 km (13 mi)
- Max. width: 13 km (8.1 mi)
- Surface area: 166 km^{2} (64 sq mi)
- Average depth: 25.6 m (84 ft) (varying)
- Max. depth: 43 m (141 ft) (varying)
- Water volume: 4 km^{3} (0.96 cu mi)
- Residence time: 5 years
- Shore length^{1}: 53 km (33 mi)
- Surface elevation: −214.66 m (704.3 ft) (varying)
- Settlements: Tiberias (Israel)
- ^{1} Shore length is not a well-defined measure.

The Sea of Galilee, (Note: Hebrew: יָם כִּנֶּרֶת, romanized: Yam Kīnnereṯ, whence also the English alternative name Kinneret.) also called Lake Tiberias, (Note: Arabic: بُحَيْرَة طَبَرِيَّا, romanized: Buḥayrat Ṭabariyyā; Jewish Palestinian Aramaic: יַמּא דְּטְבַרְיָא, romanized: Yammā də-Ṭvaryā.) Genezareth Lake (Note: Jewish Palestinian Aramaic: גִּנֵּיסַר, romanized: Ginneysar.) or Kinneret, (Note: Directly taken from the Hebrew name.) is a freshwater lake in northeast Israel. It is the lowest freshwater lake on Earth and the second-lowest lake in the world (after the Dead Sea, a salt lake), with its elevation fluctuating between 215 and 209 metres (705 and 686 ft) below sea level (depending on rainfall). It is approximately 53 km (33 mi) in circumference, about 21 km (13 mi) long, and 13 km (8 mi) wide. Its area is 166.7 km^{2} (64.4 sq mi) at its fullest, and its maximum depth is approximately 43 metres (141 ft). The lake is fed partly by underground springs, but its main source is the Jordan River, which flows through it from north to south with the outflow controlled by the Degania Dam.

== Geography ==
Sea of Galilee in relation to the Dead Sea

The Sea of Galilee is situated in northeast Israel, between the Golan Heights and the Galilee region, in the Jordan Rift Valley, formed by the relative motion of the African and Arabian plates. Consequently, the area is subject to earthquakes, and in the past, volcanic activity. This is evident from the abundant basalt and other igneous rocks that define the geology of Galilee.

== Names ==
The modern Hebrew name Kineret comes from the Hebrew Bible, where it appears as the "sea of Kineret" in Numbers 34:11 and Joshua 13:27, and spelled כנרות "Kinerot" in Hebrew in Joshua 11:2. This name was also found in the scripts of Ugarit, in the Aqhat Epic. As the name of a city, Kinneret was listed among the "fenced cities" in Joshua 19:35. A persistent, though likely erroneous, popular etymology presumes that the name Kinneret may originate from the Hebrew word kinnor ("harp" or "lyre"), because of the shape of the lake. The scholarly consensus, however, is that the origin of the name is derived from the important Bronze and Iron Age city of Kinneret, excavated at Tell el-'Oreimeh. The city of Kinneret may have been named after the body of water rather than vice versa, and there is no evidence for the origin of the town's name.

All Old and New Testament writers use the term "sea" (Hebrew יָם yam, Greek θάλασσα), with the exception of Luke, who calls it "the Lake of Gennesaret" (Luke 5:1), from the Greek λίμνη Γεννησαρέτ (limnē Gennēsaret), the "Grecized form of Chinnereth". The Babylonian Talmud as well as Flavius Josephus mention the sea by the name "Sea of Ginosar" after the small fertile plain of Ginosar that lies on its western side. Ginosar is yet another name derived from Kinneret. In English, "Lake Genezareth" serves as alternative name for the Sea of Galilee.

The word Galilee comes from the Hebrew Haggalil (הַגָלִיל), which literally means "The District", a compressed form of Gelil Haggoyim "The District of Nations" (Isaiah 8:23). Some time after the city of Tiberias was founded on its western shore in honour of Roman emperor Tiberius in 16 CE, the Sea of Galilee started to be called the Sea of Tiberias. In the New Testament, the term "sea of Galilee" (Ancient Greek: θάλασσαν τῆς Γαλιλαίας, romanized: thalassan tēs Galilaias) is used in the Gospel of Matthew 4:18; 15:29, the Gospel of Mark 1:16; 7:31, and in the Gospel of John 6:1 as "the sea of Galilee, which is [the sea] of Tiberias" (θαλάσσης τῆς Γαλιλαίας τῆς Τιβεριάδος, thalassēs tēs Galilaias tēs Tiberiados). Sea of Tiberias is also the name mentioned in Roman texts and in the Jerusalem Talmud, and it was adopted into Arabic as Buḥayrat Ṭabariyyā (بحيرة طبريا), "Lake Tiberias". Some writers use the spelling "Gallilee", for example Selah Merrill in a nineteenth century journal article.

From the Umayyad through the Mamluk period, the lake was known in Arabic as Baḥr al-Minya (بحر المنية), the "Sea of Minya", after the Umayyad qasr complex, whose ruins are still visible at Khirbat al-Minya. This is the name used by the medieval Persian and Arab scholars Al-Baladhuri, Al-Tabari and Ibn Kathir.

== History ==
=== Prehistory ===
In 1989, remains of a hunter-gatherer site were found under the water at the southern end. Remains of mud huts were found in Ohalo. Nahal Ein Gev, located about three kilometres (two miles) east of the lake, contains a village from the late Natufian period. The site is considered one of the first permanent human settlements in the world from a time predating the Neolithic Revolution.

=== Early Iron Age ===
According to Sugimoto (2015), the Iron Age IB (1150–1000 BCE) cities in the northeastern region of the Sea of Galilee likely reflect the activities of the Kingdom of Geshur, mentioned in the Bible. Also, the later Iron Age IIA–B cities here are linked with the southern expansion of the Aram-Damascus kingdom. Among these Galilean cities are Tel Dover, Tel 'En Gev, Tel Hadar, Tel Bethsaida, and Tel Kinrot.

=== Hellenistic and Roman periods ===
The Sea of Galilee lies on the ancient Via Maris, which linked Egypt with the northern empires. The Greeks, Hasmoneans, and Romans founded flourishing towns and settlements on the lake including Hippos and Tiberias. Contemporary Roman–Jewish historian Flavius Josephus was so impressed by the area that he wrote, "One may call this place the ambition of Nature"; he also reports a thriving fishing industry at this time, with 230 boats regularly working in the lake. Archaeologists discovered one such boat, nicknamed the Jesus Boat, in 1986.

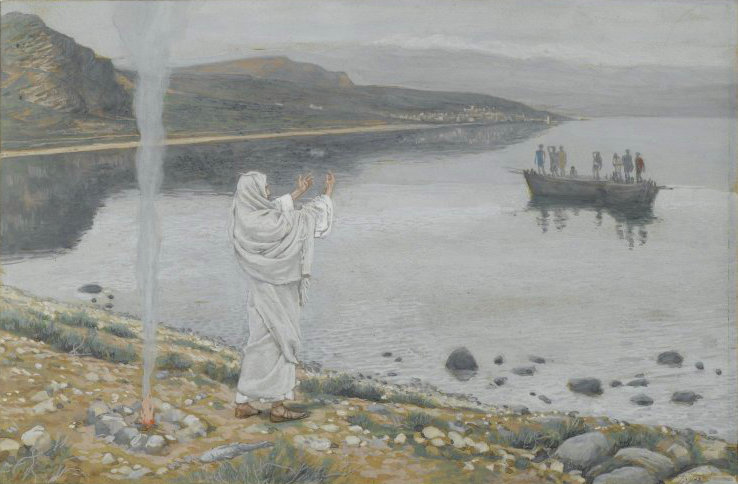
Jesus appears on the shore of Lake Tiberias by James Tissot

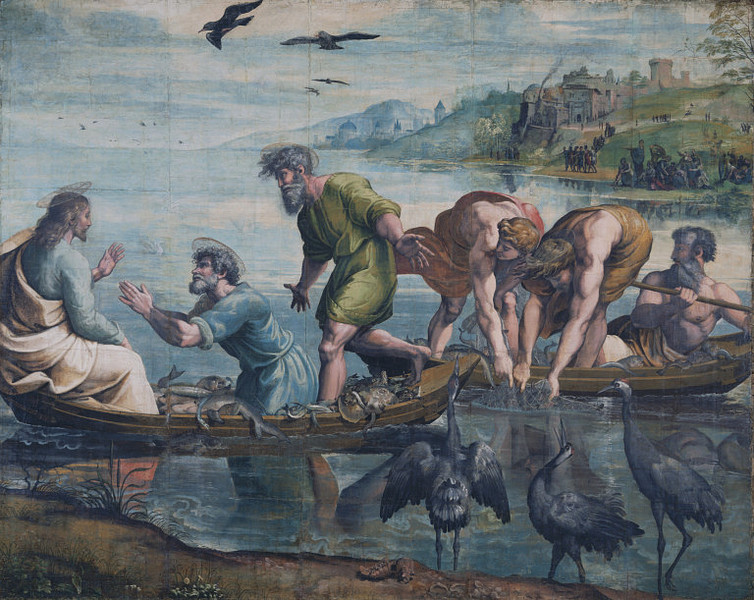
Jesus and the miraculous catch of fish, in the Sea of Galilee, by Raphael

In 135 CE, Bar Kokhba's revolt was put down which was part of the Jewish–Roman wars. The Romans responded by banning all Jews from Jerusalem. The center of Jewish culture and learning shifted to the region of Galilee and the Kinneret, particularly Tiberias. It was in this region that the Jerusalem Talmud was compiled.

=== Middle Ages ===
In 1187, Sultan Saladin defeated the armies of the Crusader Kingdom of Jerusalem at the Battle of Hattin, largely because he was able to cut the Crusaders off from the valuable fresh water of the Sea of Galilee.

=== Early 20th century ===
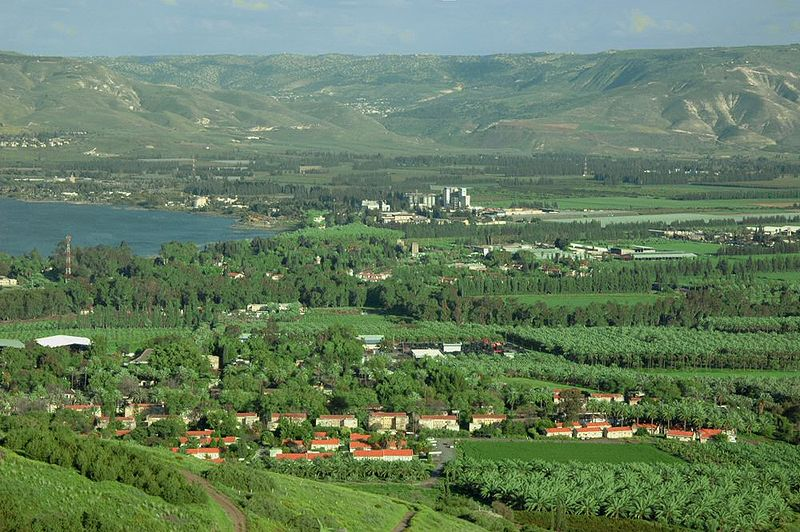
Southern tip of the lake, seen from Mount Poriya

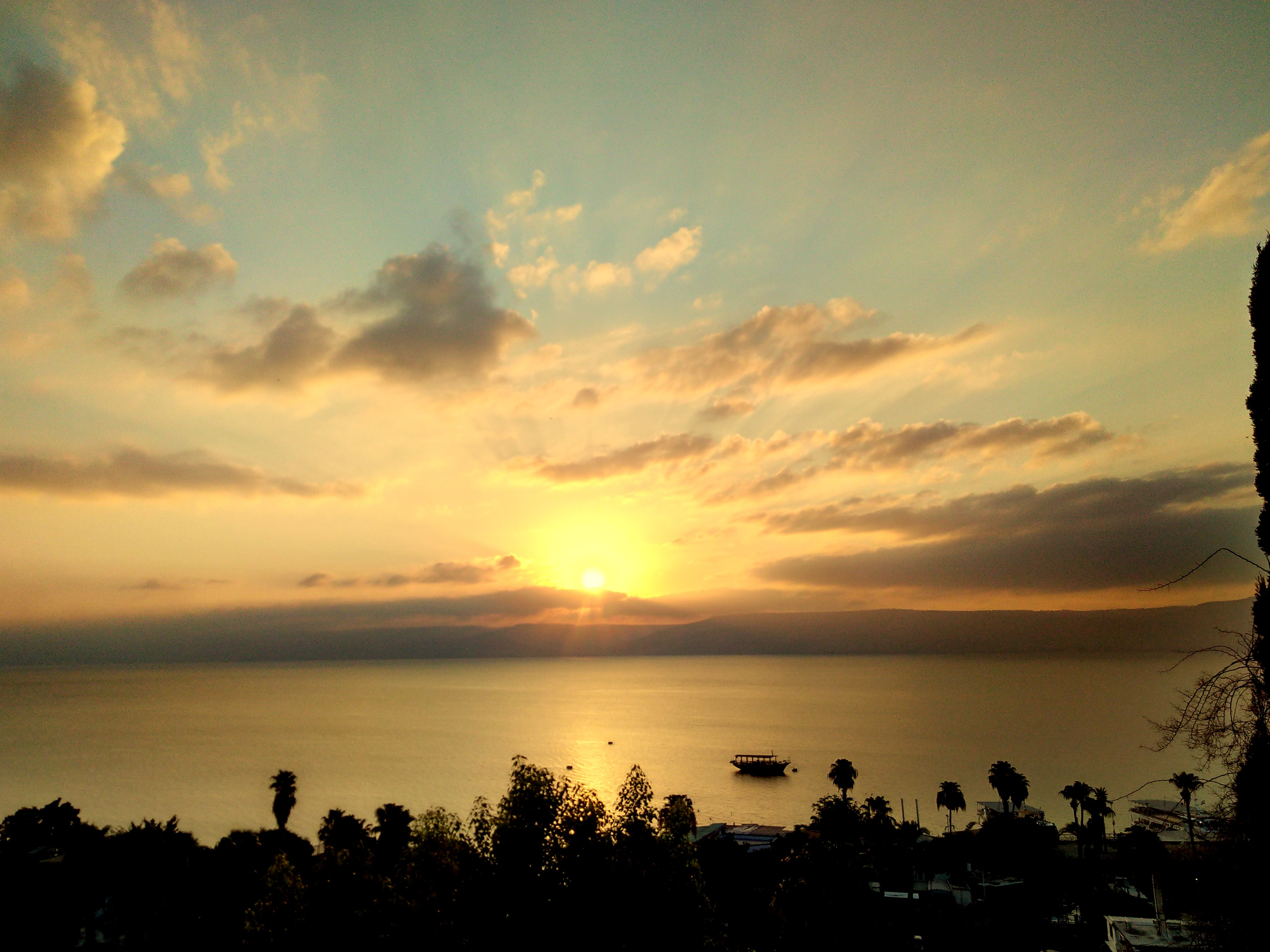
Sunrise over the Sea of Galilee from the Oasis d'Emmanuel – Tibériade

In 1917, the British defeated Ottoman Turkish forces and took control of Palestine, while France took control of Syria. In the carve-up of the Ottoman territories between Britain and France, it was agreed that Britain would retain control of Palestine while France would control Syria. This required the allies to fix the border between the Mandatory Palestine and the French Mandate of Syria. The boundary was defined in broad terms by the Franco-British Boundary Agreement of December 1920, which drew it across the middle of the lake. However, the commission established by the 1920 treaty redrew the boundary. The High Commissioner of Palestine, Herbert Samuel, had sought full control of the Sea of Galilee. The negotiations led to the inclusion into the Palestine territory of the whole Sea of Galilee, both sides of the River Jordan, Lake Hula, Dan spring, and part of the Yarmouk. The final border approved in 1923 followed a 10-meter wide strip along the lake's northeastern shore, cutting Mandatory Syria (State of Damascus) off from the lake. Geographer Gideon Biger suggests that the three factors determining the position of these boundaries were (1) "biblical-historical", (2) Zionist pressure to include as many water resources as possible in Mandatory Palestine, and (3) the human and physical landscape.

The British and French Agreement provided that existing rights over the use of the waters of the River Jordan by the inhabitants of Syria would be maintained; the government of Syria would have the right to erect a new pier at Semakh on Lake Tiberias or jointly use the existing pier; persons or goods passing between the landing-stage on the Lake of Tiberias and Semakh would not be subject to customs regulations, and the Syrian government would have access to the said landing-stage; the inhabitants of Syria and Lebanon would have the same fishing and navigation rights on Lakes Huleh, Tiberias and River Jordan, while the government of Mandatory Palestine would be responsible for policing of lakes.

=== State of Israel ===
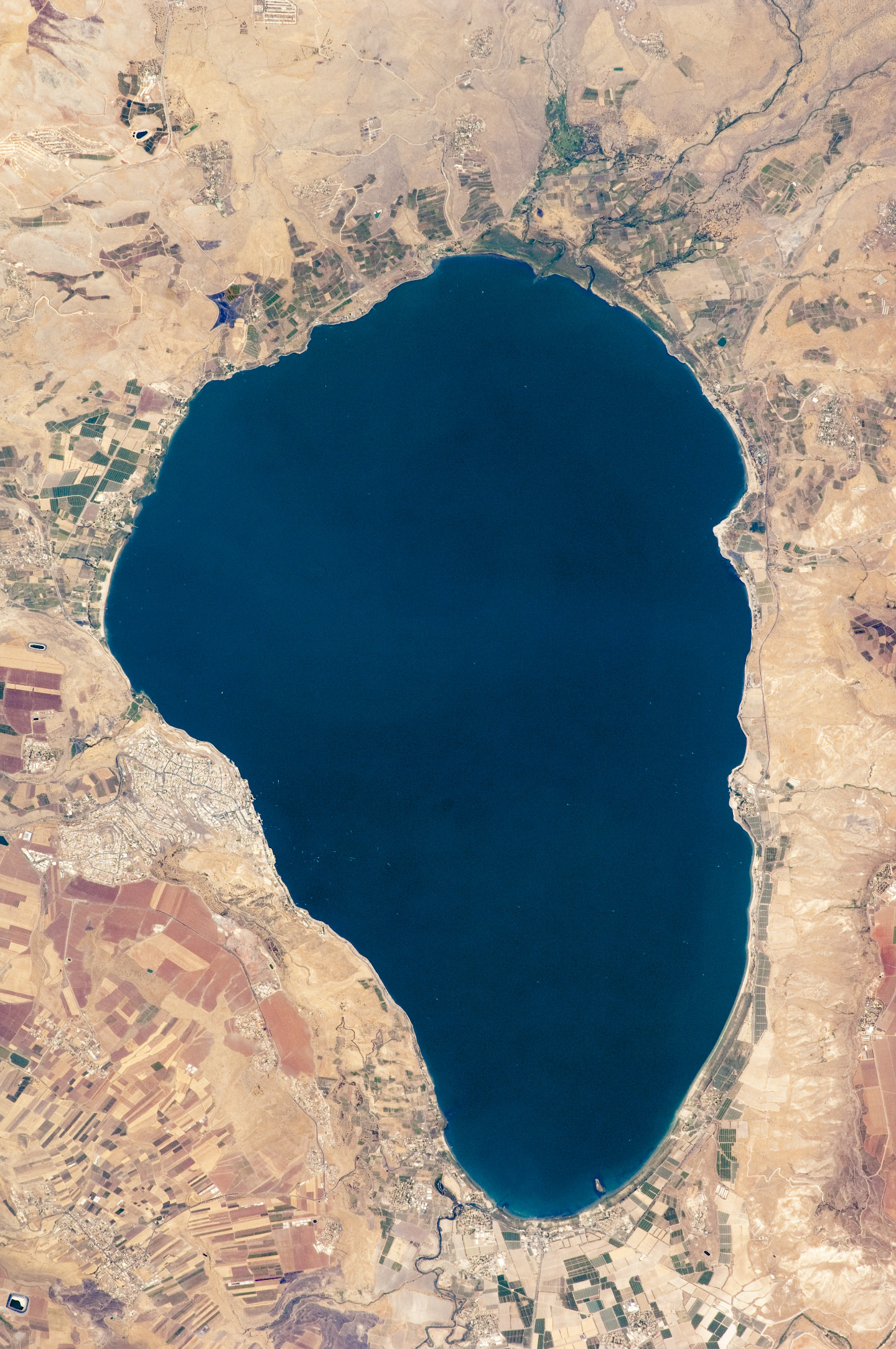
View of the Sea of Galilee from space

On 15 May 1948, Syria invaded the recently founded state of Israel, capturing territory along the Sea of Galilee. Under the 1949 armistice agreement between Israel and Syria, Syria occupied the northeast shoreline of the Sea of Galilee. The agreement stated that the armistice line was "not to be interpreted as having any relation whatsoever to ultimate territorial arrangements." Syria remained in possession of the lake's northeast shoreline until the 1967 Arab-Israeli war.

In the 1950s, Israel formulated a plan to link the Kinneret with the rest of the country's water infrastructure via the National Water Carrier, in order to supply the water demand of the growing country. The carrier was completed in 1964, providing more than three quarters of Israel's irrigation needs, a use that has shifted primarily to providing potable water. The Israeli plan, which the Arab League opposed while endorsing its own plan to divert the headwaters of the Jordan River, sparked political and sometimes even armed confrontations over the Jordan basin.

In October 2025, Israel began pumping desalinated water into the Sea of Galilee, in a world first. The project began by pumping 1,000 cubic metres (35,000 cu ft) of water per hour, which was increased in March 2026 to 4,000 cubic metres (140,000 cu ft) per hour. The water is sent from plants near the Mediterranean Sea via the Reverse Carrier to the Tzalmon Stream in Ein Ravid, where it replenishes local water supplies and makes its way to replenish the Sea of Gallilee.

== Geology ==
As a result of horizontal shifts in the north–south direction and subsidence of the area, a lake was formed, with an asymmetrical bottom—steeper in the east and a gentler in the west. In the southern part an underwater cliff is present, covered by the lake's sediments. The cliff is distinct in the western part and less so in the east.

The Sea of Galilee in its current form was preceded by Lake Lisan, which extended from the northern Sea of Galilee to Hatzeva in the south, more than 200 km (120 mi) from the present southernmost point of the lake. Lake Lisan was preceded by Lake Ovadia, a much smaller fresh water lake. Lake Kinneret was formed in its current form less than 20,000 years ago, as a result of tectonic subsidence and the shrinking up of Lake Lisan.

== Archaeology ==
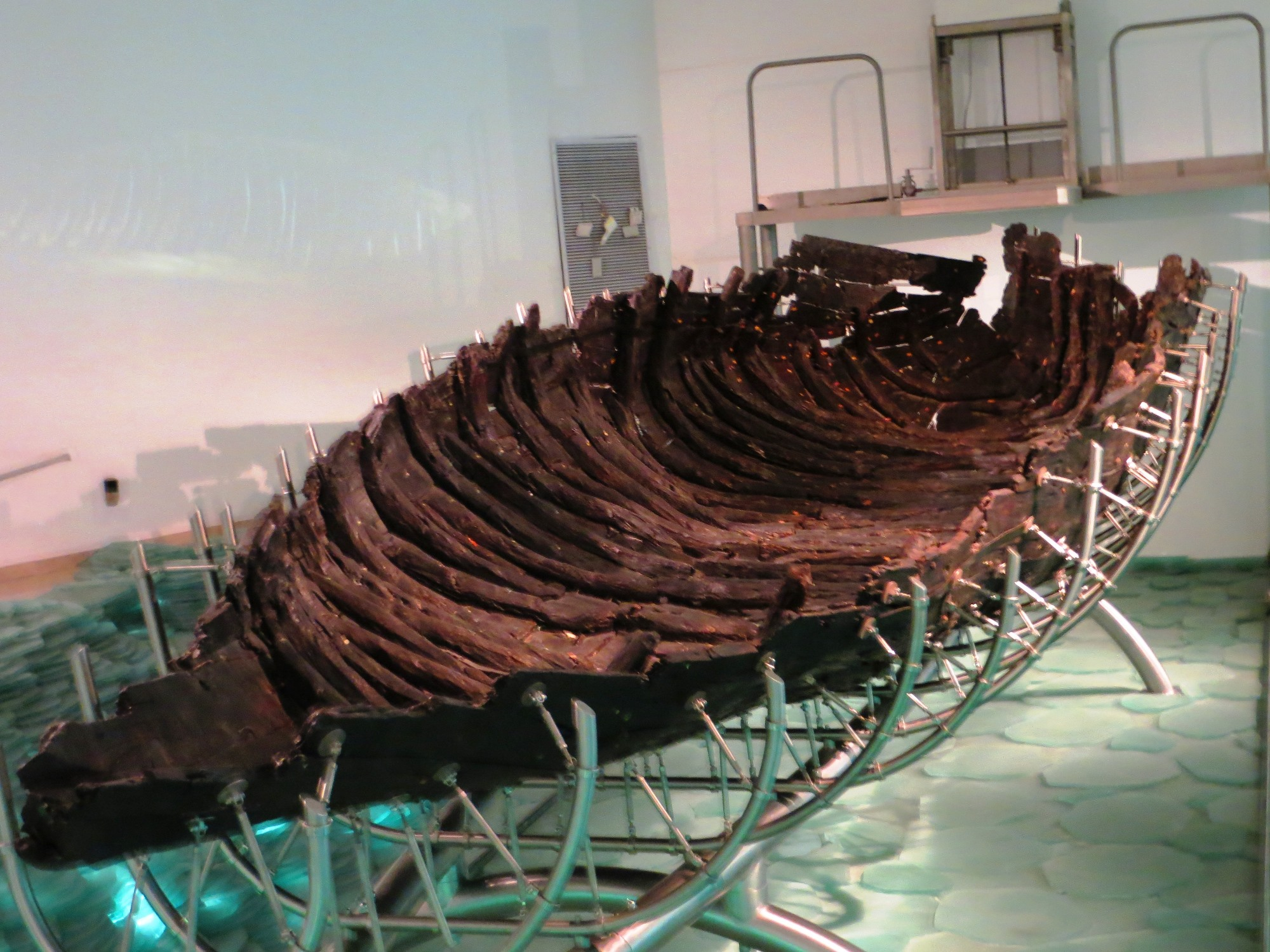
Ancient Galilee boat at Kibbutz Ginosar

During a routine sonar scan in 2003 (finding published in 2013), archaeologists discovered an enormous conical stone structure. The structure, which has a diameter of around 230 feet (70 m), is made of boulders and stones. The ruins are estimated to be between 2,000 and 12,000 years old and are about 10 metres (33 ft) underwater. The estimated weight of the monument is over 60,000 tons. Researchers explain that the site resembles early burial sites in Europe and was likely built in the early Bronze Age.

In February 2018, archaeologists discovered seven intact mosaics with Greek inscriptions. One inscription, at five meters one of the longest found to date in western Galilee, gives the names of donors and the names and positions of church officials, including Irenaeus, bishop of Tyre in 445. Another mosaic mentions a woman as a donor to the church's construction. This inscription is the first in the region to mention a female donor.

== Water level ==
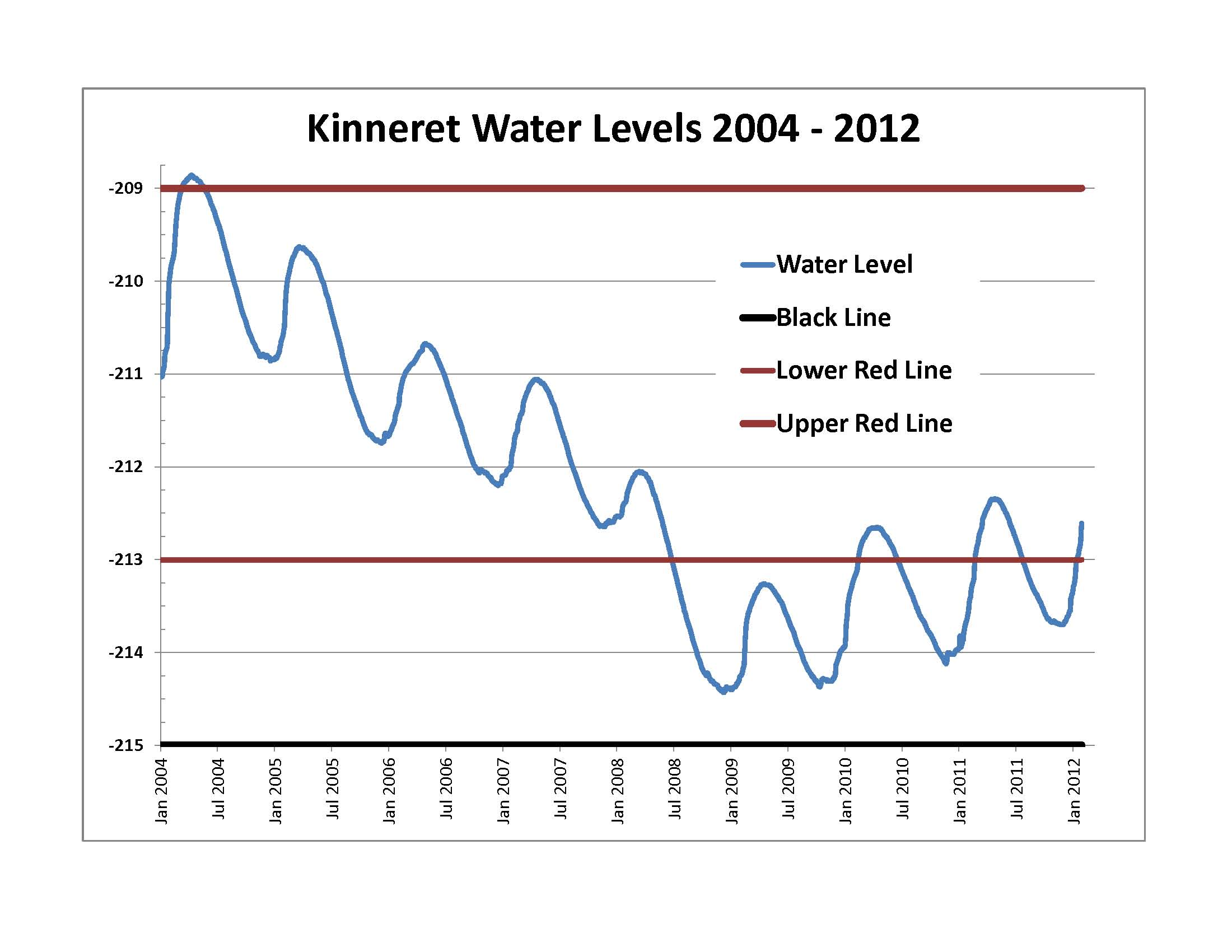
Sea of Galilee water levels (January 2004 – February 2012)

The water level is monitored and regulated. There are three levels at which the alarm is rung:

- The upper red line, 208.9 m (685 ft) below sea level (BSL), where facilities on the shore start being flooded.
- The lower red line, 213.2 m (699 ft) BSL, where pumping should stop.
- The black (low-level) line, 214.4 m (703 ft) BSL, where irreversible damage occurs.

Daily monitoring of the Sea of Galilee's water level began in 1969, and the lowest level recorded since then was November 2001, which today constitutes the "black line" of 214.87 meters below sea level (although it is believed that in the first half of the 20th century, the water level had fallen lower than the current black line at times of drought). The Israeli government monitors water levels and publishes the results daily. Increasing water demand in Israel, Lebanon and Jordan, as well as dry winters, have resulted in stress on the lake and a decreasing water line to dangerously low levels at times. The Sea of Galilee is at risk of becoming irreversibly salinized by the salt water springs under the lake, which are held in check by the weight of the freshwater on top of them.

After five years of drought up to 2018, the Sea of Galilee was expected to drop near the black line. In February 2018, the city of Tiberias requested a desalination plant to treat the water coming from the Sea of Galilee and demanded a new water source for the city. March 2018 was the lowest point in water income to the lake since 1927. In September 2018 the Israeli energy and water office announced a project to pour desalinated water from the Mediterranean Sea into the Sea of Galilee using a tunnel. The tunnel is expected to be the largest of its kind in Israel and will transfer half of the Mediterranean desalted water and will move 300 to 500 million m^{3} (11 to 18 billion cu ft) of water per year. The plan is said to cost five billion shekels.

Since the beginning of the 2018–19 rainy season, the Sea of Galilee has risen considerably. From being near the ecologically dangerous black line of −214.4 m, the level has risen by April 2020 to just 16 cm (6.3 in) below the upper red line, a result of strong rains and a radical decrease in pumping. During the entire 2018–19 rainy season the water level rose by a historical record of 3.47 meters (11.4 ft), while the 2019–20 winter brought a 2.82 meters (9 ft 3 in) rise. The Water Authority dug a new canal in order to let 5 billion liters (1.1×10^{9} imp gal; 1.3×10^{9} U.S. gal) of water flow from the lake directly into the Jordan River, bypassing the existing dams system for technical and financial reasons.

Due to the low water levels of the lake, in October 2025 Israel began pumping desalinated water into the Sea of Galilee, an unprecedented step globally, as it marks the first attempt to top up a freshwater lake with processed water. The project is expected to raise the lake's level by around 0.5 centimetres (0.20 in) per month.

== Water use ==
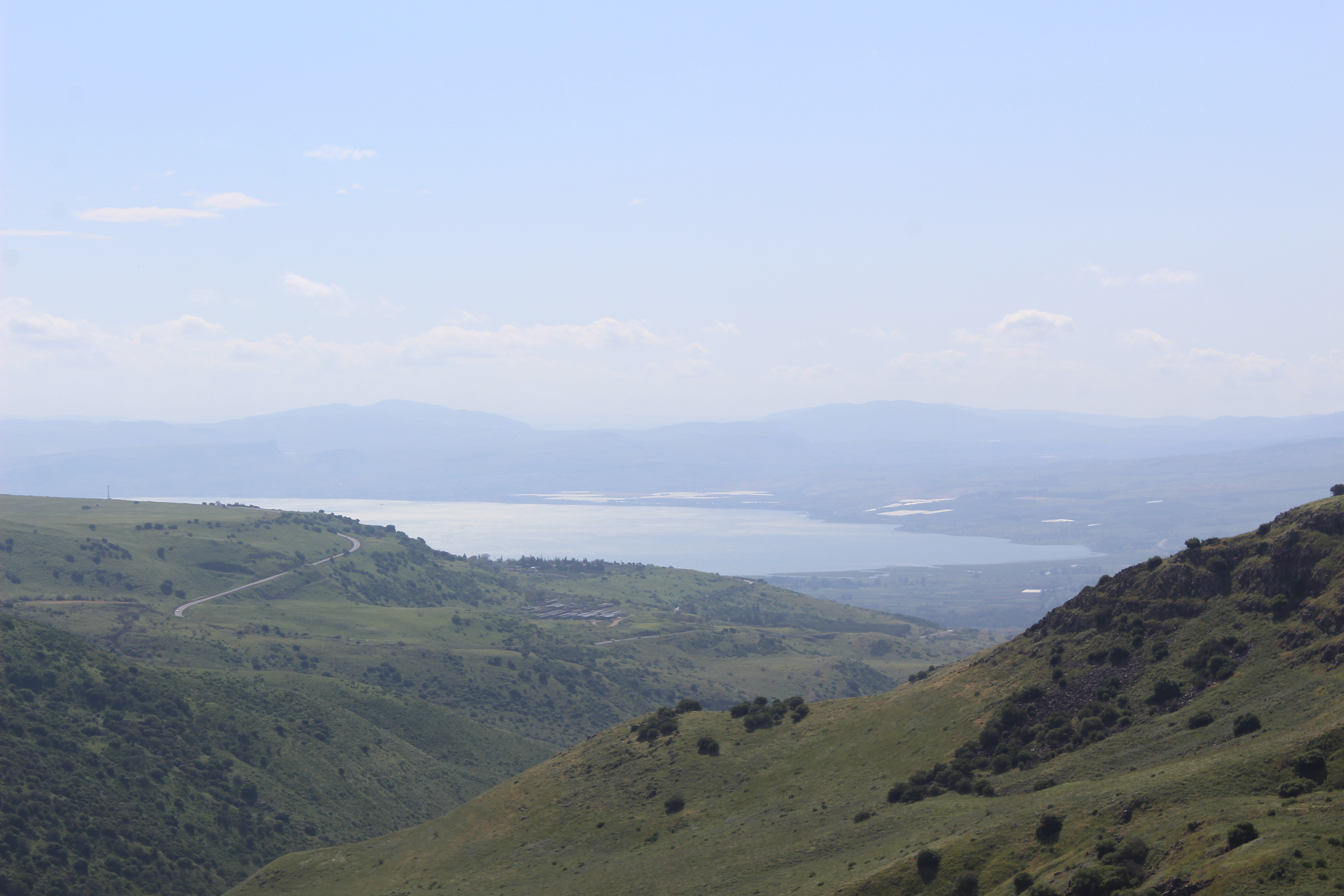
The Sea of Galilee as seen from Gamla in the Golan Heights

The National Water Carrier of Israel, completed in 1964, transports water from the lake to the population centers of Israel, and in the past supplied most of the country's drinking water. In 2016 the lake supplied approximately 10% of Israel's drinking water needs.

In 1964, Syria attempted construction of a Headwater Diversion Plan that would have blocked the flow of water into the Sea of Galilee, sharply reducing the water flow into the lake. This project and Israel's attempt to block these efforts in 1965 were factors which played into regional tensions culminating in the 1967 Six-Day War. During the war, Israel captured the Golan Heights, which contain some of the sources of water for the Sea of Galilee.

Up until the mid-2010s, about 400 million m^{3} (14 billion cu ft) of water was pumped through the National Water Carrier each year. Under the terms of the Israel–Jordan peace treaty, Israel also supplies 50 million m^{3} (1.8 billion cu ft) of water annually from the lake to Jordan. In recent years the Israeli government has made extensive investments in water conservation, reclamation and desalination infrastructure in the country. This has allowed it to significantly reduce the amount of water pumped from the lake annually in an effort to restore and improve its ecological environment, as well as respond to some of the most extreme drought conditions in hundreds of years affecting the lake's intake basin since 1998. Therefore, it was expected that in 2016 only about 25 million m^{3} (880 million cu ft) of water would be drawn from the lake for Israeli domestic consumption, a small fraction of the amount typically drawn from the lake over the previous decades.

== Tourism ==
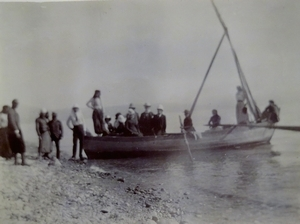
Tourists on a boat at Tiberias, 1891

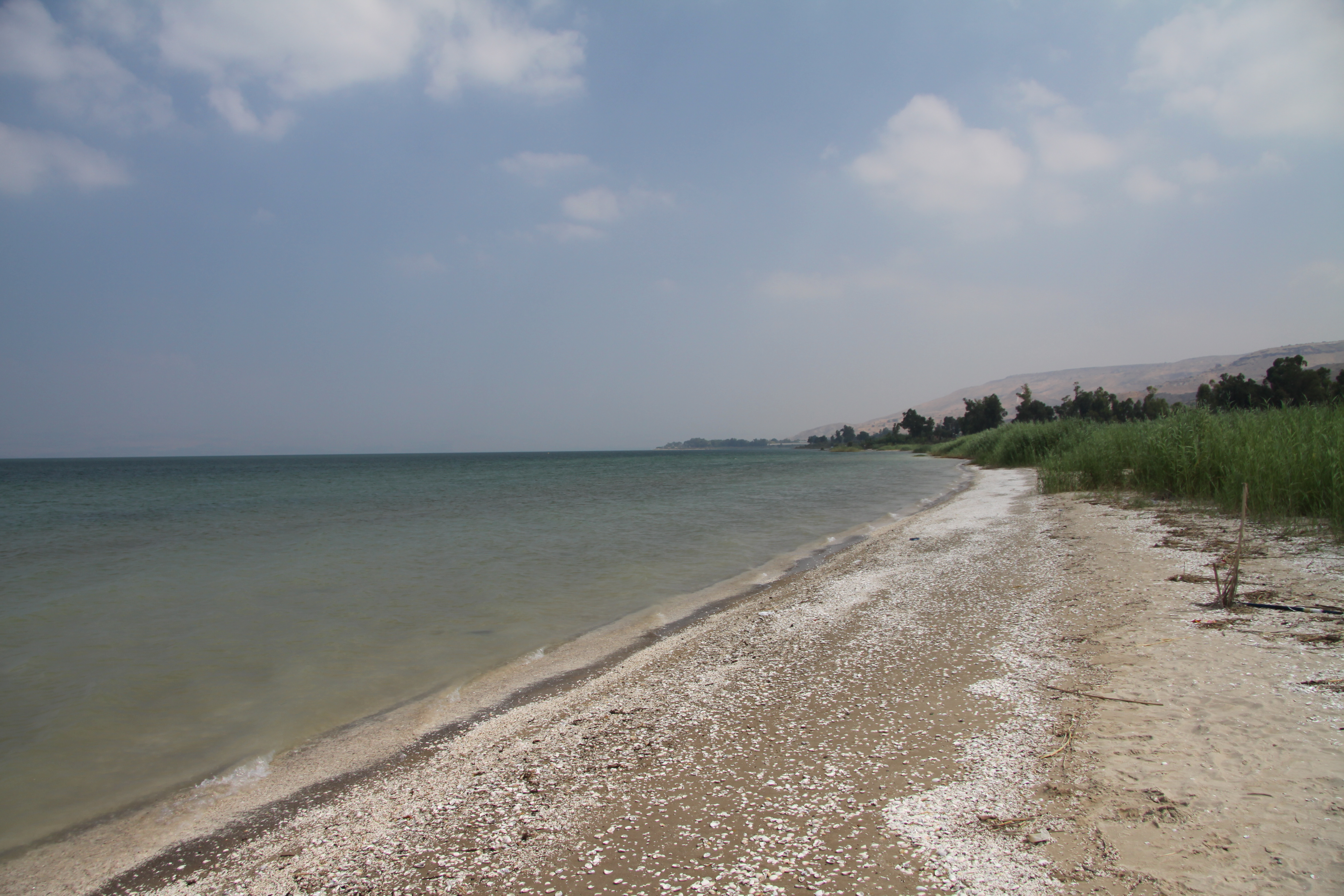
Kinneret beach

Tourism around the Sea of Galilee is an important economic segment. Historical and religious sites in the region draw both local and foreign tourists. The Sea of Galilee is an attraction for Christian pilgrims who visit Israel to see the places where Jesus performed miracles according to the New Testament. Alonzo Ketcham Parker, a 19th-century American traveler, called visiting the Sea of Galilee "a 'fifth gospel' which one read devoutly, his heart overflowing with quiet joy".

In April 2011, Israel unveiled a 40-mile (64 km) hiking trail in Galilee for Christian pilgrims, called the "Jesus Trail". It includes a network of footpaths, roads and bicycle paths linking sites central to the lives of Jesus and his disciples. It ends at Capernaum on the shores of the Sea of Galilee, where Jesus expounded his teachings.

Israel's most well-known open water swim race, the Kinneret Crossing, is held every year in September, drawing thousands of open water swimmers to participate in competitive and noncompetitive events. Tourists also partake in the building of rafts on Lavnun Beach, called Rafsodia. Here many different age groups work together to build a raft with their bare hands and then sail that raft across the sea. Other economic activities include fishing in the lake and agriculture, particularly bananas, dates, mangoes, grapes and olives in the fertile belt of land surrounding it.

The Turkish Aviators Monument, erected during the Ottoman era, stands near Kibbutz Ha'on on the lakeshore, commemorating the Turkish pilots whose monoplanes crashed en route to Jerusalem.

== Ecology ==
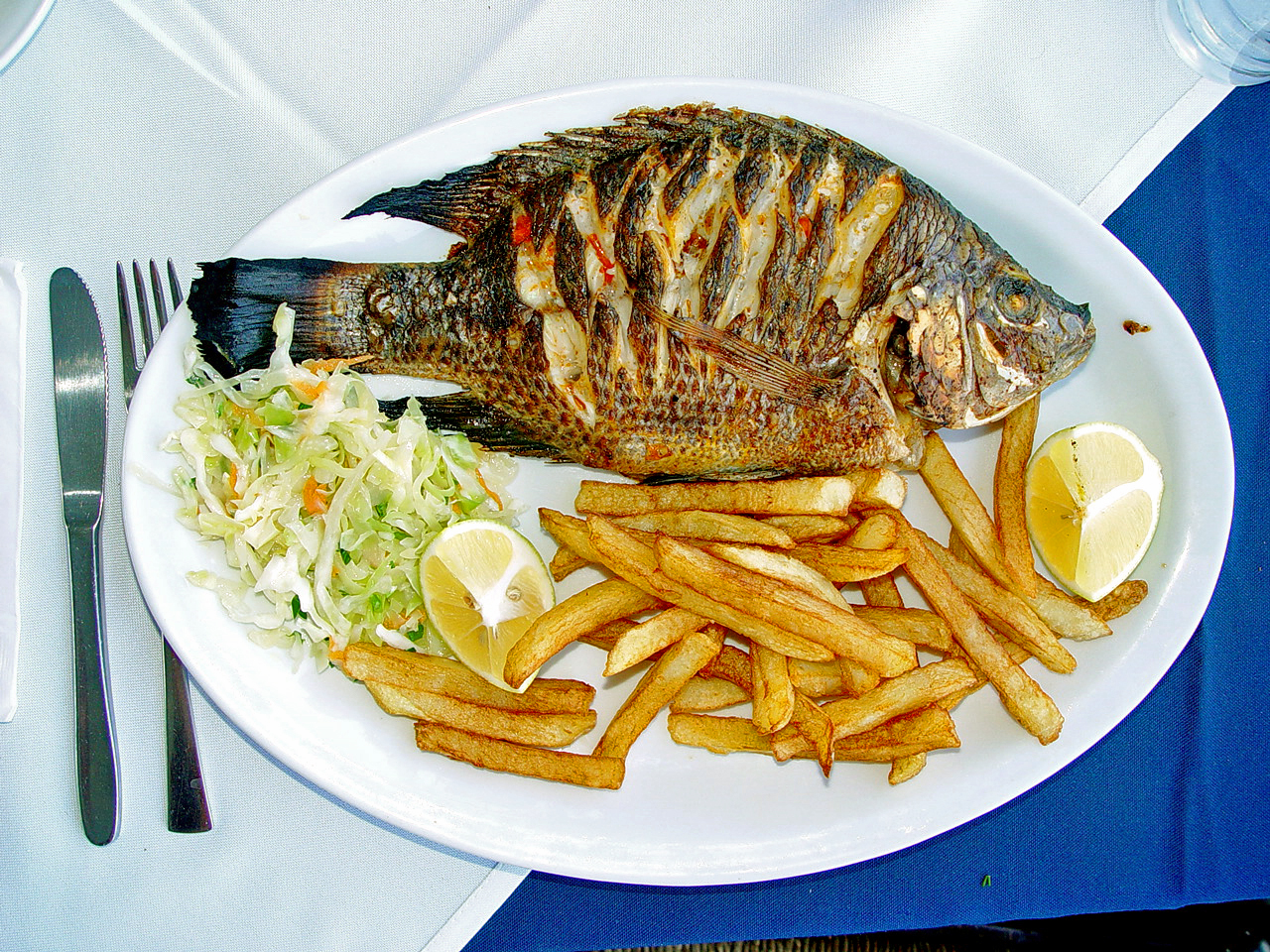
Redbelly tilapia (Tilapia zillii; "St. Peter's fish") served in a Tiberias restaurant

The warm waters of the Sea of Galilee support various flora and fauna, which have supported a significant commercial fishery for more than two millennia. Local flora include various reeds along most of the shoreline as well as phytoplankton. Fauna include zooplankton, benthos and a number of fish species such as Mirogrex terraesanctae. The Fishing and Agricultural Division of the Ministry of Water and Agriculture of Israel lists 10 families of fish living in the lake, with a total of 27 species – 19 native and 8 introduced species. Local fishermen talk of four types of fish: "مشط musht" (tilapia); sardin (the Kinneret bleak, Mirogrex terraesanctae); "بني biny" or Jordan barbel, Luciobarbus longiceps (barb-like); and North African sharptooth catfish (Clarias gariepinus). The tilapia species include the Galilean tilapia (Sarotherodon galilaeus), the blue tilapia (Oreochromis aureus), and the redbelly tilapia (Tilapia zillii). Fish caught commercially include Tristramella simonis and the Galilean tilapia, locally called "St. Peter's fish". In 2005, 270 tonnes (300 short tons) of tilapia were caught by local fishermen. This dropped to seven tonnes (eight short tons) in 2009 because of overfishing. A fish species that is unique to the lake, Tristramella sacra, used to spawn in the marsh and has not been seen since the 1990s droughts. Conservationists fear this species may have become extinct.

Low water levels in drought years have stressed the lake's ecology. This may have been aggravated by over-extraction of water for either the National Water Carrier to supply other parts of Israel or, since 1994, for the supply of water to Jordan. Droughts of the early and mid-1990s dried out the marshy northern margin of the lake. It is hoped that drastic reductions in the amount of water pumped through the National Water Carrier will help restore the lake's ecology over the span of several years.

The lake, with its immediate surrounds, has been recognised as an Important Bird Area by BirdLife International because it supports populations of black francolins and non-breeding griffon vultures as well as many wintering waterbirds, including marbled teals, great crested grebes, grey herons, great white egrets, great cormorants and black-headed gulls.

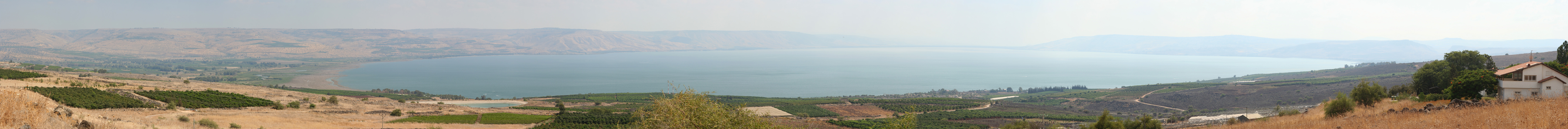
Panoramic view of the Sea of Galilee

== See also ==
- Kinneret, Canaanite and ancient Hebrew toponym
  - Ginosar (disambiguation), derived Classical toponym
- Miracles of Jesus
  - The Storm on the Sea of Galilee (1633 Rembrandt painting)
