= Tzurit Or =

Israeli businesswoman in Boston, Massachusetts

- צורית אור
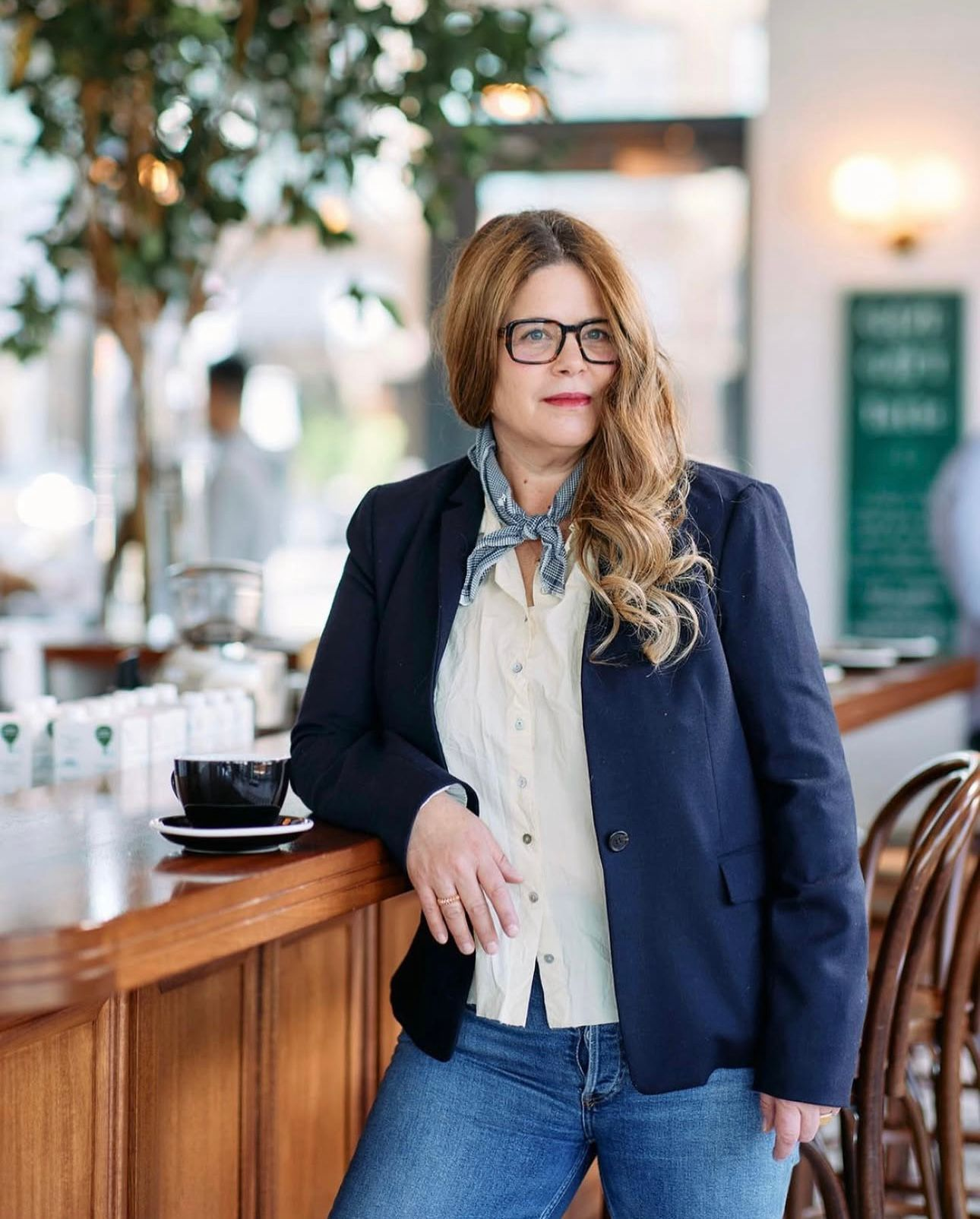
- Born: June 13, 1972 (age 54); Kvutzat Kinneret, Israel
- Education: Tel Aviv University
- Occupations: Founder & Chief Creative Officer, Tatte Bakery & Café

Tzurit Or (Hebrew: צורית אור) is an Israeli-born film producer and pastry chef. She is the founder and Chief Creative Officer of the Tatte Bakery & Café, with locations in the Greater Boston area, Washington, D.C. area, and the New York City area.

== Early life and film career ==
Or grew up in Kvutzat Kinneret, a kibbutz in northern Israel located near the sea of Galilee. She is a descendent of Shmuel Stoller and grew up in a "baking family" and has baked since she was very young.

From age 18 to 20, Or served her mandatory military service in the Israel Defense Forces. After serving, Or earned her Bachelor's degree in communications at Tel Aviv University. She went to work for an Israeli media company and worked as a film producer for 12 years.

In 2003, Or emigrated to the United States and briefly lived in Los Angeles, California. In early 2006, Or and her family relocated to Boston. She now lives in Washington, DC, and Brookline, Massachusetts.

== Tatte Bakery & Café ==
In 2007, Or began baking in her home kitchen and joined a local Farmers Market to sell her creations at the Copley Square Farmer's Market in Boston. Among her creations you could find Brioche, the famous Chocolate Rose and her signature, The Nut Box, as well as her Nut Tarts among other treats.

The stand was widely popular, and in 2008, she opened the first Tatte Bakery & Café brick and mortar location in Brookline. Tatte, pronounced like "latte," offers a wide variety of baked goods and savory dishes along with a full coffee and beverages menu.

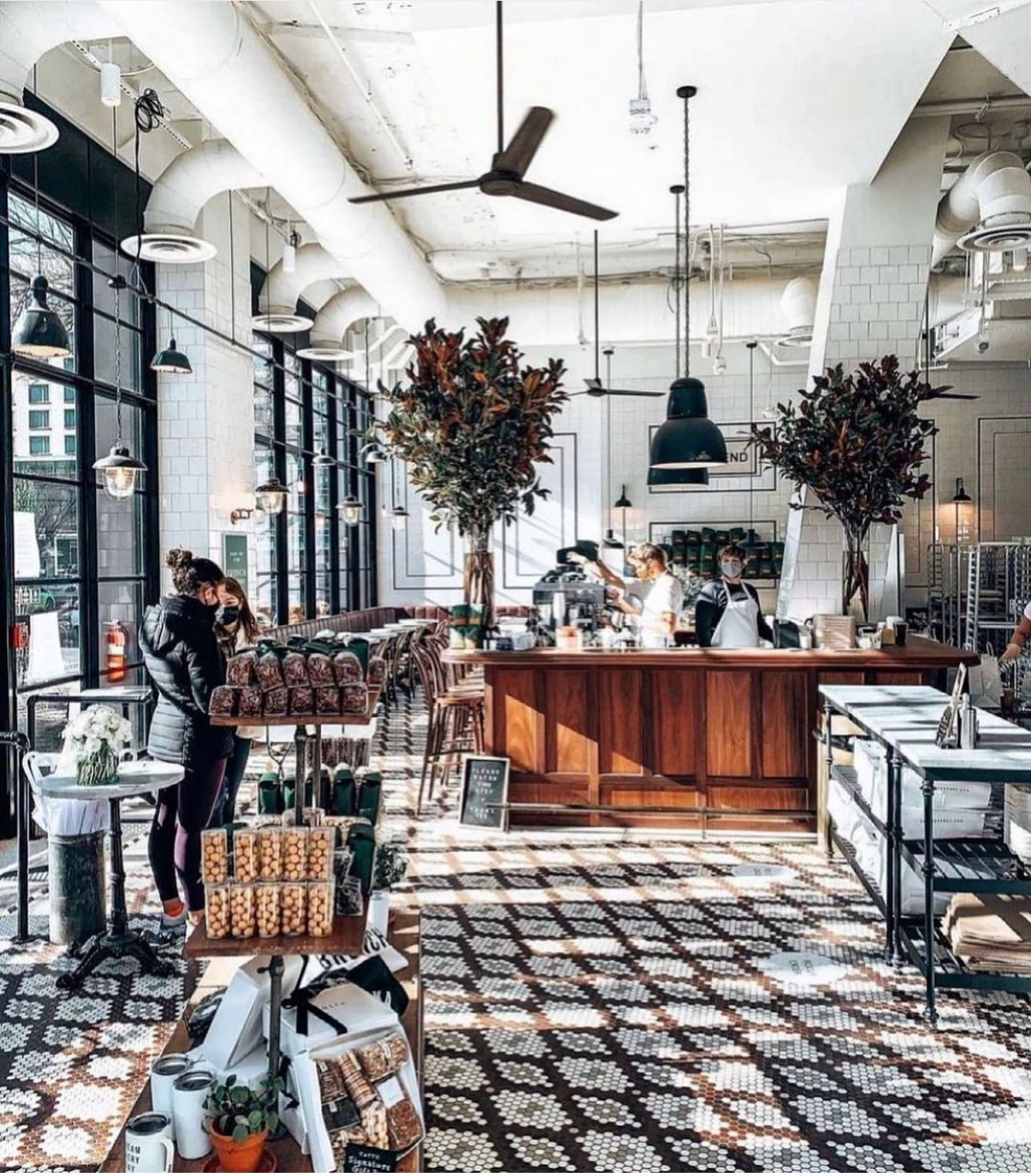
Tatte Bakery & Cafe location in West End (Washington, D.C.)

In 2016, the founder of Panera Bread and Au Bon Pain, Ron Shaich, bought a 50.01% stake in Tatte. and became Or’s partner in building the brand. As of 2026, there are 58 Tatte locations in Massachusetts, the metro D.C. region and the New York Tri-State area.

In September 2019, Or took the position of Chief Creative Officer focusing solely on Tatte bakery and food innovation, store design, the brand voice and RE development and handed over the CEO role to Chuck Chapman.

Or stepped down as Tatte's CEO in July 2020 following discrimination complaints.
