= Ron Shaich =

American businessman

- Born: December 30, 1953 (age 72); Newark, New Jersey, U.S.
- Education: Clark University (BA) (1976); Harvard Business School (MBA) (1978); Clark University (Doctor of Humane Letters (Hon.) (2014)
- Occupation: Businessman
- Years active: 1978–present
- Known for: Au Bon Pain: CEO 1984–1999 Panera Bread: CEO 1999–2010 & 2013–2017 Act III Holdings: CEO and Managing Partner 2018–present
- Website: ronshaich.com act3holdings.com

Ronald M. Shaich (born December 30, 1953) is an American businessman and entrepreneur who co-founded Au Bon Pain Inc., and later, founded Panera Bread, and has been CEO and chairman of both. Shaich is credited with helping create the fast-casual segment.

Shaich sold Panera Bread for $7.5 billion in 2017. He is CEO and managing partner of Act III Holdings, an investment firm that he founded in 2018 with approximately $250 million of his and partners' money. Shaich is the chairman and lead investor in Act III's portfolio companies such as Cava and Tatte Bakery & Café During his career, Shaich was a public company CEO for 27 years, and was involved in taking three different restaurant brands public—Au Bon Pain, Panera, and Cava.

== Early life and education ==
Ronald M. Shaich was born on December 30, 1953, to Joseph and Pearl Shaich (née Kalfus) in Newark, New Jersey, to a Jewish family. Joe Shaich was a certified public accountant and Pearl was a homemaker. Shaich has one sister.

Raised in Livingston, New Jersey, Shaich graduated from Livingston High School in 1971. Shaich attended Clark University, graduating with a B.A. in government and politics in 1976. Shaich later graduated with an MBA from Harvard Business School in 1978. He was awarded an honorary doctorate from Clark in May 2014.

== Career ==
=== Early career ===
Shaich began his first business on Clark University's campus, running a convenience store for students. While earning his MBA, he worked as an assistant to the president of Store 24, Inc. and then as an assistant to the vice president of marketing at CVS Stores. After business school, Shaich was the Eastern Regional Manager for the Original Cookie Company and launched the Cookie Jar bakery in Boston in 1980. Shortly thereafter, Shaich added fresh croissants and baguettes to the Cookie Jar menu to attract the lunch crowd. The breads and croissants came from Au Bon Pain.

=== Au Bon Pain ===
In 1981, Shaich merged his Cookie Jar with three Au Bon Pain bakeries, which were led by Louis I. Kane, a Boston-area venture capitalist, and together they created Au Bon Pain Co. Inc. Shaich then led Au Bon Pain's conversion from bakeries to bakery cafés. Au Bon Pain grew rapidly as Shaich and Kane took it public in 1991 and by 1993, the company had grown to 250 stores, primarily in high density urban markets in the Northeast.

Later in 1993, Shaich led an acquisition in which Au Bon Pain acquired the St. Louis Bread Company, a chain of 20 bakery cafes located in St. Louis for $24 million. Shaich used St. Louis Bread Co. to develop the Panera Bread concept. All subsequent bakery cafes that opened outside of the St. Louis market were called Panera Bread while those in St. Louis retained the St. Louis Bread Company moniker.

In 1997, Shaich refocused on Panera alone. By May 1999, Au Boin Pain Manufacturing was sold to Bunge Foods, and Au Bon Pain USA and Au Bon Pain International were sold to private-equity firm Bruckmann, Rosser, Sherrill & Co. After the sale, the sole remaining division of Au Bon Pain Co. Inc. was the Panera division and the public company name was changed from Au Bon Pain Co. Inc. to Panera Bread with the public stock symbol becoming PNRA.

=== Panera Bread ===
In 1999, in addition to the 20 St. Louis Bread Company stores, Shaich's Panera Bread had more than 150 cafes. By 2000, Panera Bread had 227 stores open across 27 states and $202 million in sales. Its stock went from $6 per share in 1999 to $19 per share in 2000 about a year later. It posted profits of $21.8 million in 2002. Panera was also the first national restaurant chain to post full calorie information for consumers. In early 2004, the stock was trading at $40 per share. By 2005, total sales of Panera Bread were $2 billion with profits of $81.1 million and a stock price of $73.56.

In November 2009, Shaich announced that he would step down as CEO of Panera Bread in 2010 while retaining his role as the company's Executive Chairman. Bill Moreton, took over as CEO. Shaich returned to Panera in 2011. He became Co-CEO with Bill Moreton in March 2012 and officially reclaimed the role as sole CEO at Panera in August 2013. Bill Moreton stayed with the company as Executive Vice Chairman.

Shaich led the sale of Panera to JAB Holdings for approximately $7.5 billion ($315 per share) in a deal approved by Panera's shareholders on July 11, 2017. The deal was the largest U.S. restaurant deal ever done up until that point in time at among the highest multiples – 18x EBITDA – on record. Once the acquisition was final, JAB Holdings took the company private.

In November 2017, Shaich led Panera's acquisition of Au Bon Pain. That same day, Shaich announced that he was stepping down as CEO, effective Jan. 1, 2018. Olivier Goudet took over as chairman in 2018.

=== Act III Holdings ===
In 2018, Shaich founded Act III Holdings LLC, an evergreen investment vehicle, with $250 million of his and his partners' money. As of 2023, Act III has a portfolio valued in excess of $1 billion. Shaich is Act III's Managing Partner & CEO.

Shaich's first major investment with Act III was as a lead investor in Cava. As part of the acquisition, Shaich became chair of the combined company and Act III is among Cava's lead investors with 10% of the equity. As chairman, Shaich assisted with Cava Group's initial public offering (IPO) in June 2023. Other notable investments from Shaich's Act III portfolio include Tatte Bakery & Café, Life Alive, and Level99.

== Book ==
- Shaich, Ron (2023), Know What Matters: Lessons from a Lifetime of Transformations, Harvard Business Review Press, ISBN 978-1-64782-559-1
