= Paradise Bakery & Café =

Arizona based casual restaurant chain

- Formerly: Cookie Muncher's Paradise
- Industry: Bakery, Café
- Founded: 1976; 50 years ago
- Founder: Daniel Patterson
- Services: Soups, salads, sandwiches, baked goods
- Parent: Panera Bread
- Website: paradisebakery.com

Paradise Bakery & Café is a Scottsdale, Arizona-based chain of bakery–café quick casual restaurants predominantly located in the western and southwestern United States. It was independently established in 1976; as of 2009, it is wholly owned by Panera Bread. In 2012, it operated 60 stores in 9 states. As of 2026, the locations left are in Omaha, NE and Gretna, Nebraska. There is also a location in Aspen Colorado.

== History ==
The chain was established in Long Beach, California, in 1976 by Daniel Patterson. At the time it was known as Cookie Muncher's Paradise and exclusively sold cookies, muffins, and lemonade. By 1979, it had expanded its product portfolio to include sandwiches, soups, salads, and other bakery items.

In February 2007, a majority stake in the chain was purchased by Panera, which later bought out the remainder of the company in 2009. In 2016, the majority of Paradise Bakeries (excluding locations in food courts) were converted to Panera Bread restaurants. In 2012, Mark and Daniel Patterson still owned and operated one Paradise Bakery in Aspen, Colorado. As of 2025, the only locations left are in Dallas, Texas and Gretna, Nebraska.
