= Bruckmann, Rosser, Sherrill & Co. =

American private equity firm

- Type: Private
- Industry: Private equity
- Founded: 1995; 31 years ago
- Founder: Bruce Bruckmann, Harold Rosser, Stephen Sherrill
- Headquarters: New York, New York, United States
- Products: Leveraged buyout, Growth capital
- Total assets: $1.4 billion
- Number of employees: 20+
- Website: brs.com

Bruckmann, Rosser, Sherrill & Co. is an American private equity firm focused on growth capital investments in middle-market companies in the consumer products, specialty retail, and restaurant sectors.

The firm, which is based in New York City, was founded in 1995. The firm has raised approximately $1.4 billion since inception across three funds. The firm was founded by Bruce Bruckmann, Harold Rosser, and Stephen Sherrill, who had previously worked together as executives of Citicorp Venture Capital since as early as 1983.

Within the restaurant and retail sectors, BRS's notable investments have included Au Bon Pain, Bravo! Cucina Italiana, California Pizza Kitchen, Il Fornaio, Jitney Jungle, Lazy Days' RV Center, Logan's Roadhouse, McCormick & Schmick's, Real Mex Restaurants and Town Sports International Holdings.

Previous logo

In the consumer Products space, BRS has completed notable investments in AMF Bowling, B&G Foods, Doane Pet Care, Remington Arms and Totes»ISOTONER.
