= Panera Bread =

American restaurant chain

Panera Bread Company

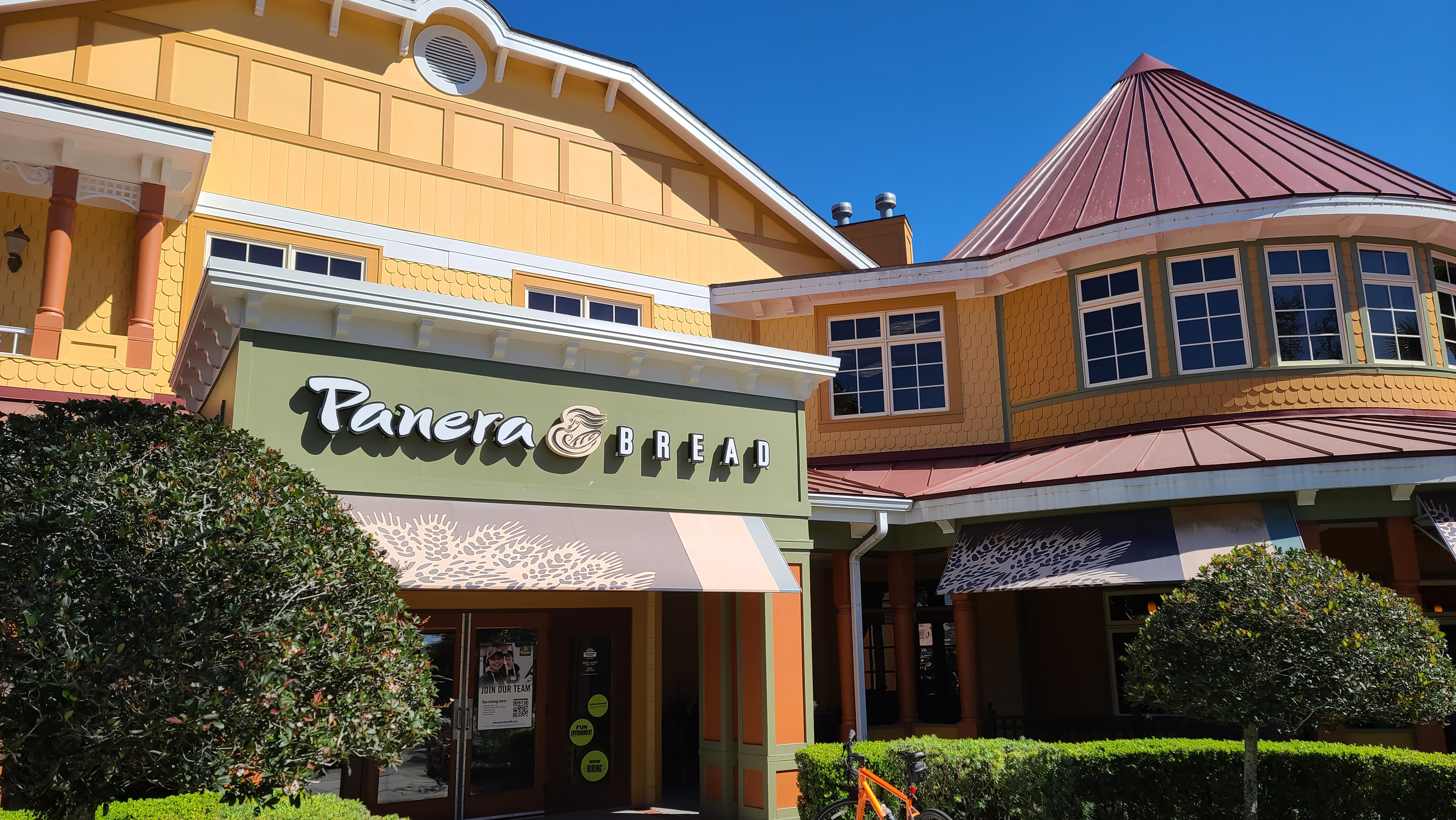
- Panera Bread in The Villages, Florida
- Trade name: Panera Bread
- Type: Private
- Traded as: Nasdaq: PNRA (until 2017)
- Industry: Café; Coffee Shop; Bakery
- Genre: Fast casual
- Founded: St. Louis Bread Co.: 1987; 39 years ago Kirkwood, Missouri, U.S. Panera Bread: 1997; 29 years ago St. Louis, Missouri, U.S.
- Founder: St. Louis Bread Company: Ken Rosenthal and Linda Rosenthal; Panera Bread: Louis Kane and Ronald M. Shaich
- Headquarters: Fenton, Missouri, United States
- Number of locations: Panera Bread: 2,078; St. Louis Bread Co.: 100; Total: 2,178
- Area served: United States; Canada
- Key people: Ronald M. Shaich – founder and chairman Ken Rosenthal – founder of The St. Louis Bread Company; Paul Carbone – CEO (2025–present); Charles J. Chapman, III – executive VP and COO; Sue Morelli – president of Au Bon Pain
- Products: Bakery-café serving several varieties of bread –: bagels; baguettes; cold sandwiches; hot panini; salads; soups; coffee; teas
- Revenue: ▲US$6.456 billion (2023)
- Net income: ▼US$145 million (2016)
- Total assets: ▼US$1.301 billion (2016)
- Total equity: ▼US$288 million (2016)
- Number of employees: About 140,000
- Parent: JAB Holding Company
- Subsidiaries: Paradise Bakery & Café
- Website: panerabread.com

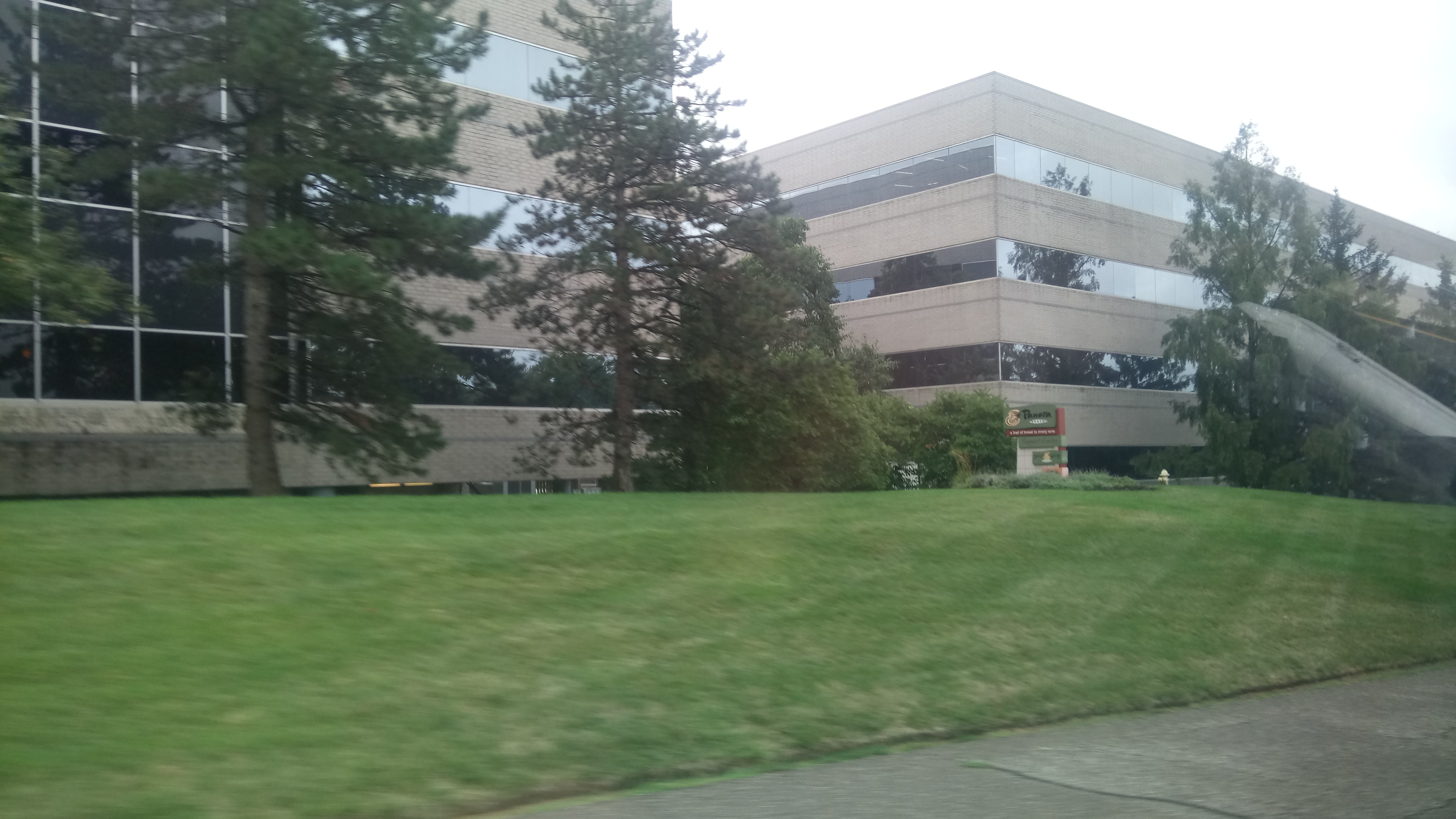
Former headquarters in Sunset Hills, Missouri, near St. Louis

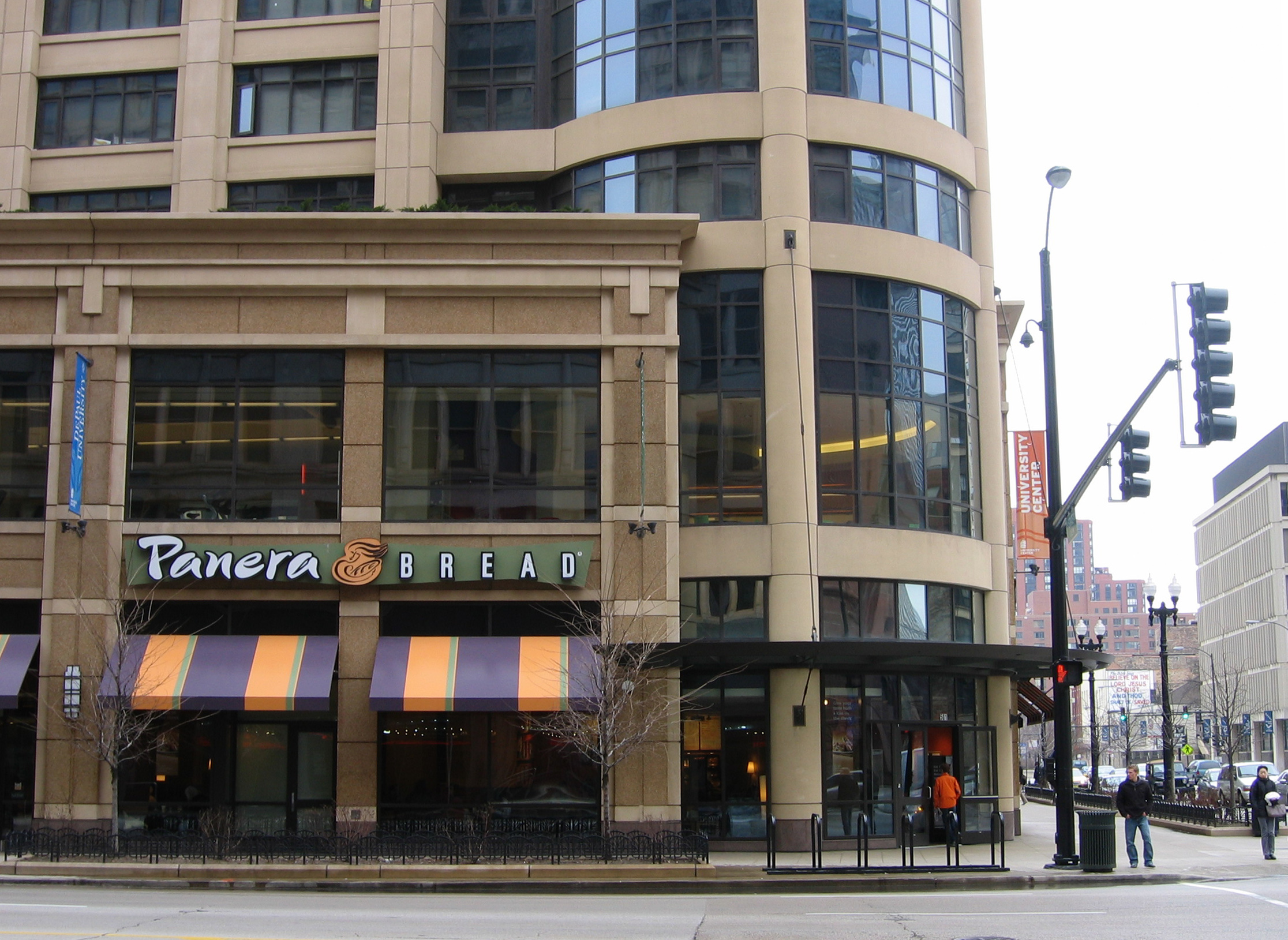
Panera Bread in the Chicago Loop in 2006

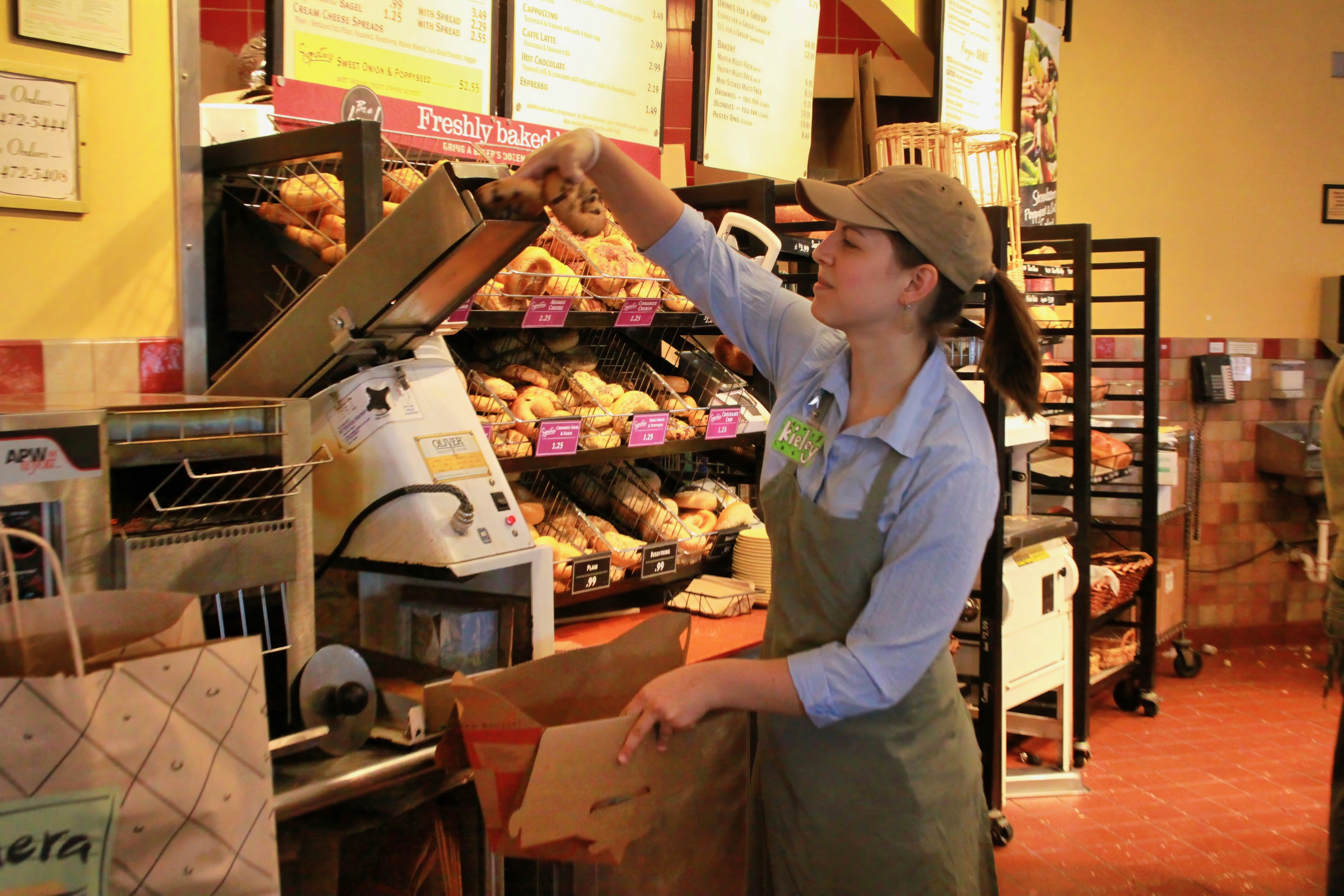
An employee places a bagel in a slicer at a Panera Bread in Cleveland, Tennessee.

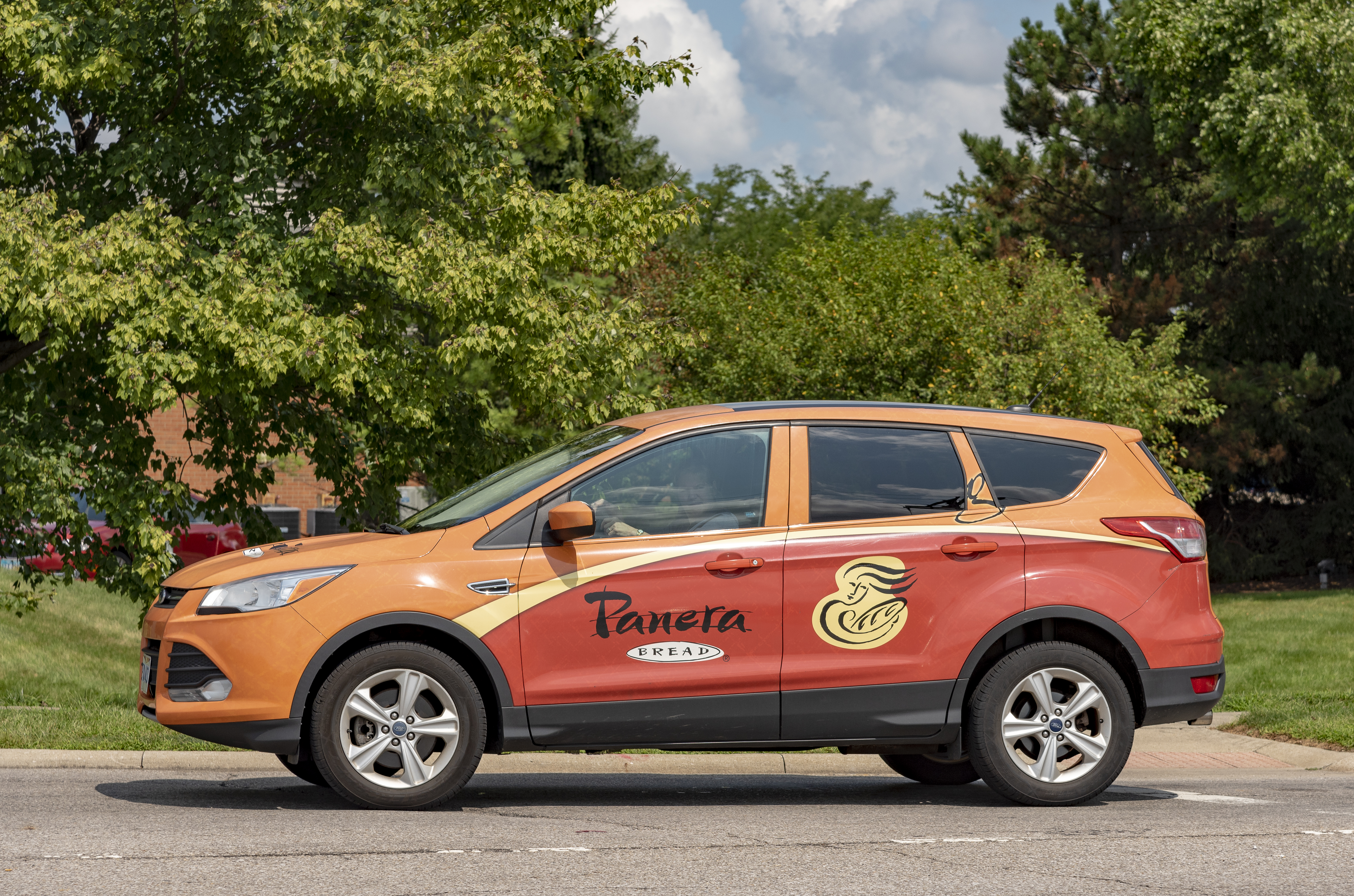
Panera delivery vehicle

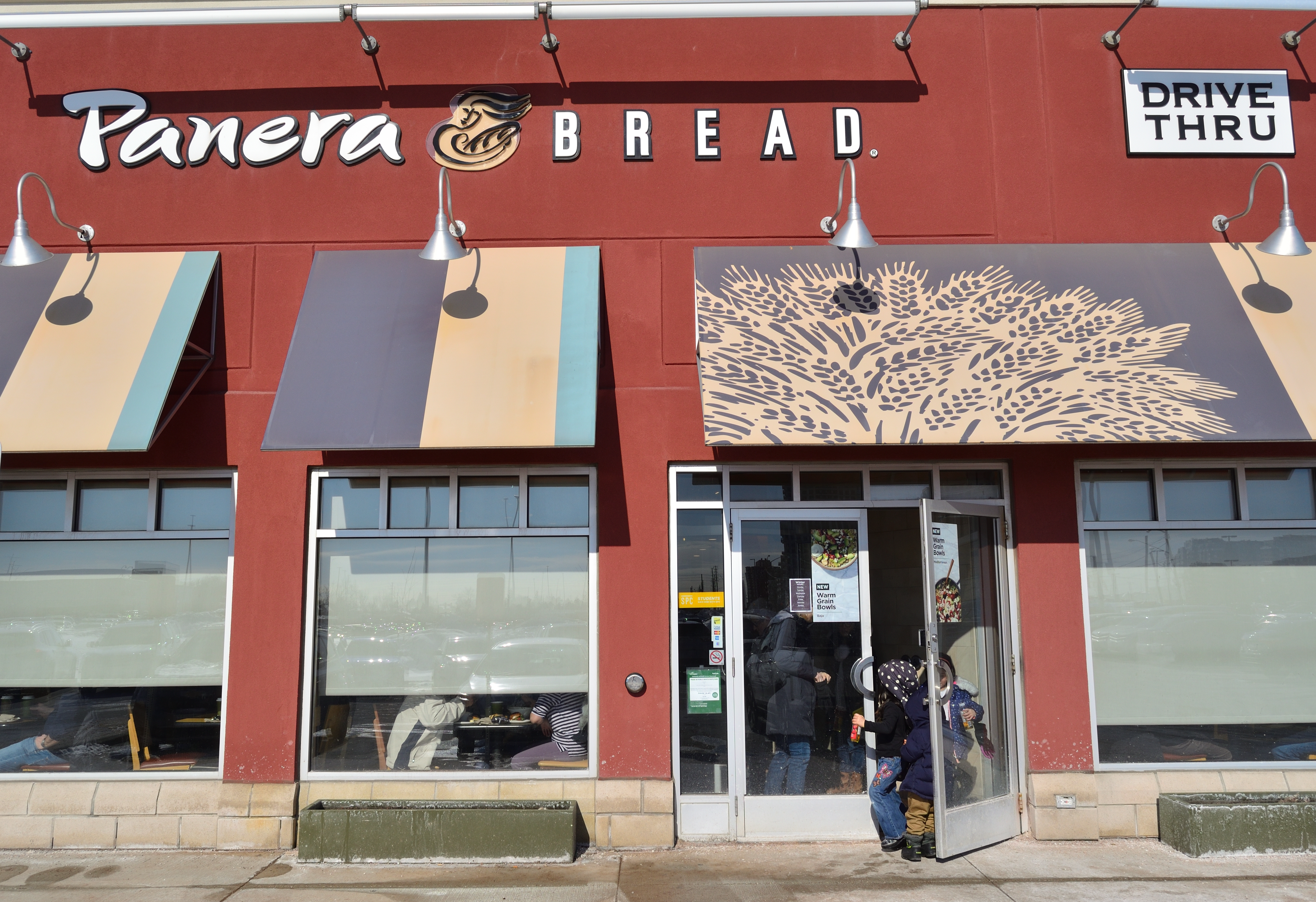
Panera Bread in Canada

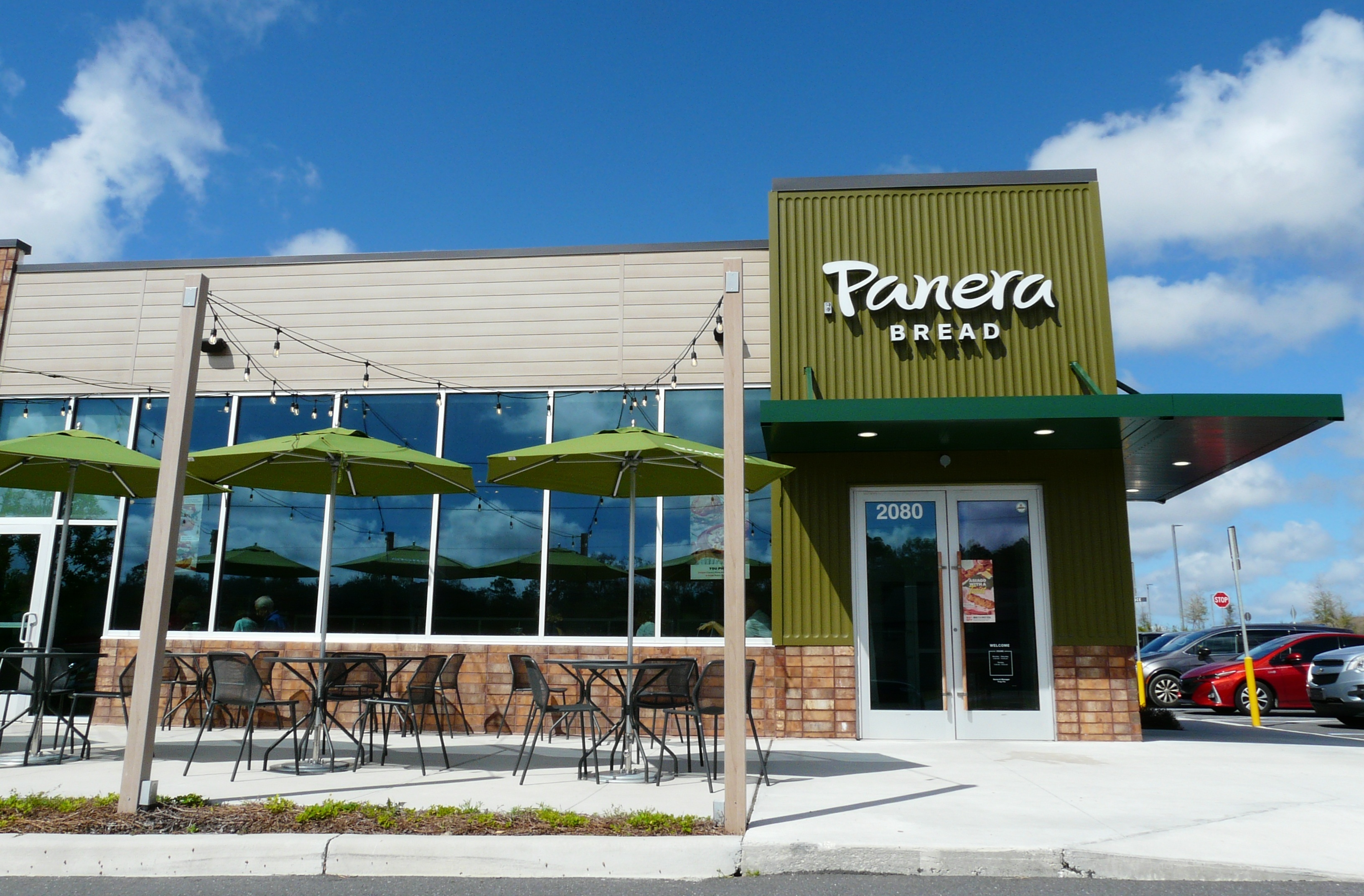
Panera Bread in Black Diamond, Florida

Panera Bread Company (/pəˈnɛərə/ pə-NAIR-ə) is an American multinational chain of bakery-cafe fast casual restaurants with over 2,000 locations, all of which are in the United States and Canada. Its headquarters are in Fenton, Missouri. The chain operates as Saint Louis Bread Company in the Greater St. Louis area, with over 100 locations.

Panera offers a wide array of pastries and baked goods, such as bagels, brownies, cookies, croissants, muffins, and scones. These, along with Panera's artisan breads, are typically baked by an on-staff baker the day before serving. Aside from the bakery section, Panera has a regular menu for dine-in or takeout, including salads, sandwiches, side choices, and soups, as well as coffee, espresso drinks, frozen drinks, fruit smoothies, hot chocolate, iced drinks, lattes, lemonade, and tea.

Panera Bread, formerly owned by Au Bon Pain, is currently owned by JAB Holding Company, which is, in turn, owned by the Reimann family of Germany. Panera was once the largest provider of free Wi-Fi hotspots in the United States.

== History ==
Ken and Linda Rosenthal founded the St. Louis Bread Company in 1987 after Ken visited sourdough bakery-café La Boulanger in San Francisco at the insistence of his brother. After being fascinated with the process of sourdough making, he was trained to make sourdough under instruction of the owner, Roger Brunello for a year. The first location was opened in Kirkwood, Missouri. The Rosenthals invested $150,000 and received a $150,000 Small Business Administration loan.

Au Bon Pain Co., a public company, purchased the St. Louis Bread Company in 1993 for $23 million.

In 1997, Au Bon Pain changed the company name to Panera, from a word that has roots in the Latin word for "breadbasket" (Classical pānārium, Vulgar pānāria) and is identical to the word for "breadbasket" in Spanish and Catalan. The original name was retained for locations in Missouri. At the same time, the St. Louis Bread Company renovated its 20 bakery-cafes in the St. Louis area.

In May 1999, Au Bon Pain Co. sold the Au Bon Pain chain to the firm Bruckmann, Rosser, Sherrill & Co. for $78 million to focus on the Panera Bread chain.

In 2000, Panera Bread moved its headquarters to Richmond Heights, Missouri.

In 2007, Panera Bread purchased a 51% stake in Paradise Bakery & Café, a Phoenix metropolitan area-based concept with over 70 locations in 10 states, predominantly in the West and Southwest, for $21.1 million. The company purchased the balance of Paradise in June 2009.

=== Expansion into Canada ===
In October 2008, Panera Bread expanded into Canada, opening locations in Richmond Hill, Thornhill, Oakville, and Mississauga in the Greater Toronto Area.

A class action lawsuit was filed against the company in February 2008, alleging it failed to disclose material adverse facts about the company's financial well-being, business relationships, and prospects. In February 2011, Panera agreed to pay $5.75 million to shareholders while admitting no wrongdoing, settling the lawsuit.

In November 2010, Panera Bread relocated its headquarters to Sunset Hills while vacating its Richmond Heights headquarters and Brentwood, Missouri offices. The company leased additional space for its headquarters in 2013.

=== Ordering and delivery ===
In May 2014, Panera unveiled "Panera 2.0", a series of integrated technologies including new capabilities for digital ordering, payment, operations, and consumption. It includes tablet kiosks with iPads, which the company calls Fast Lane, where customers may place an order and pay without approaching the counter. Customers can also place orders and pay via an app on their smartphone or tablet. In 2017, digital orders accounted for over $1 billion in orders or 26% of sales.

The company introduced delivery services in May 2018, servicing 897 cities in 43 states and employing its own drivers. According to the company, this created 13,000 jobs.

=== Rebranding, acquisitions, and use of technology ===
==== 2010s ====
Every Paradise Bakery & Café location was rebranded in September 2015 as Panera Bread.

In the fourth quarter of 2015, Panera acquired a majority stake in Tatte Bakery & Café, a bakery-cafe concept chain with locations in the Boston area, later opening in metro Washington D.C.

On March 23, 2016, Panera opened its 2,000th location, a cafe in Elyria, Ohio.

In January 2017, Panera announced its food menu was free of artificial colors, flavors, sweeteners, and preservatives.

JAB Holding Company acquired the company on July 11, 2017, for $7.5 billion.

On November 8, 2017, Panera announced that founder Ron Shaich was stepping down as CEO, and company president Blaine Hurst would take over. Shaich remained chairman. The company also announced the acquisition of Au Bon Pain.

Panera divested Tatte Bakery & Café to Act III Holdings, LLC, owned by Shaich in January 2018.

In January 2018, the company formed a consulting business to help restaurants remove artificial ingredients from their menus.

On April 2, 2018, Brian Krebs reported that the Panera Bread website had leaked between 7 million and 37 million customer records— including names, email, and physical addresses, customer loyalty account numbers, birthdays, and last four digits of the customers' credit card numbers— for at least eight months before the site was taken offline. Panera was notified privately about the vulnerability in August 2017 but failed to fix it until after it was disclosed publicly eight months later. Panera said the leak affected fewer than 10,000 customers and had been fixed.

==== 2020s ====
On October 28, 2020, Panera announced they would add pizza to their menu to increase dinner options for customers.

Panera announced on August 25, 2021, that it had merged with Caribou Coffee and Einstein Bros. Bagels to form Panera Brands.

In August 2022, the company announced that it was testing the use of artificial intelligence in its drive-thru lanes via two locations in upstate New York. It used OpenCity's voice ordering technology, Tori. At the time of the announcement, roughly 45% of the chain's locations had drive-thru lanes. In making this move, the firm was joining other firms in the restaurant industry, like McDonald's, Burger King, and Taco Bell, and it came on top of other uses of artificial intelligence at the chain.

In September 2022, Panera announced that legacy St. Louis Bread Co. locations outside St. Louis City and St. Louis County would be rebranded as Panera when remodeled, with locations in the inner core of the metro retaining the Bread Co. name. One location in St. Louis County is named Panera as it is a prototype of the "Next Gen" restaurant design.

In mid-2023, Panera moved its headquarters from Sunset Hills to Fenton, Missouri, downsizing the square footage by more than half. The move preceded two rounds of corporate layoffs in late 2023 and 2024.

In December 2023, it was learned that Panera Bread confidentially filed to go public again. The company was last publicly traded in 2017 before being acquired by JAB Holding for $7.5 billion.

In April 2024, Panera launched a major menu overhaul marketed as the "New Era at Panera," which the company described as the most significant menu transformation in its history. The update involved discontinuing categories such as flatbread pizzas and grain bowls to refocus on core offerings like soups, salads, and sandwiches. The change introduced over 20 new or enhanced items with larger portions and lower price points in a strategic effort to improve value and increase customer traffic.

On February 14, 2025, Ken Rosenthal, the founder of St. Louis Bread Company, died at age 81 due to complications from Alzheimer's disease.

In March 2025, the company named Paul Carbone its new CEO.

In July 2025, it was announced that the company was continuing a move begun in 2024 to a "par-baked" model for its restaurants, closing down existing dough-making facilities, and laying off employees. This model has restaurants receive partially-baked ("Par-baked") frozen bread which is finished in the store instead of freshly baked every day. The company has also been reportedly rolling back their "clean food guidelines" which previously advocated for stances against antibiotics and hormones, and for animal welfare.

== Social responsibility ==
=== Panera Cares: non-profit restaurants ===
In 2010, the company's nonprofit foundation created Panera Cares, a "Pay what you can", pay it forward (PIF), and traditional charitable behavior restaurant in its home market of St. Louis. CEO Ron Shaich based the idea on an NBC profile of the SAME Cafe in Denver, Colorado. It later expanded the concept to Dearborn, Michigan; Portland, Oregon; Chicago; and Boston. Several of their sites served 3,500 customers weekly. The Panera Cares in Chicago shut down at the end of January 2015. The Panera Cares in Portland, Oregon shut down at the end of June 2016. The original location near St. Louis closed in January 2018. The last location in Boston closed on February 15, 2019.

=== Caged and cage-free eggs ===
On November 5, 2015, Panera pledged that it would use only cage-free eggs in all of its stores by 2020. Panera also announced the addition of more plant-based proteins, such as edamame and organic quinoa, to its menu. At the time of the announcement, the company said it was 21% cage-free in the roughly 70 million eggs it used in 2015. In December 2016, it published its third animal welfare progress report, announcing new efforts to improve broiler chicken welfare. In 2021, Panera announced that it had transitioned to cage-free eggs for 65% of its egg supply but not yet the remaining 35%.

=== Climate change ===
Panera Bread includes a "Cool Food" pledge in its campaign to "curb global warming". Panera Bread provides American consumers with dietary guidelines to help them change their eating patterns to help reduce carbon emissions. Through the Cool Foods pledge, the company uses traffic lights for different healthy and unhealthy foods. Foods labeled "green" are branded healthy, while those labeled "yellow" are warned to be consumed in moderation. In 2015, Panera Bread also announced its policy against the use of genetically modified organisms (GMOs), making it the first food chain in the country to question the safety and environmental friendliness of these foods.

=== Community giving ===
The Day-End Dough-Nation program provides unsold bread and baked goods to local area hunger relief agencies and charities. Panera Bread bakery-cafes donate $100 million worth of unsold bread and baked goods annually to local organizations. Panera also supports events held by non-profit organizations serving those in need by donating a certificate or fresh bakery products.

== Controversies and lawsuits ==
=== Animal welfare issues and lawsuit ===
Panera Bread has been the subject of increased scrutiny regarding its animal welfare policies, particularly its sourcing of pork, dairy, and seafood. According to Reuters, internal documents revealed that the company has loosened its ingredient standards, allowing the use of some antibiotics in pork and turkey and permitting animal byproducts in cattle and chicken feed. Drawing on that report, a 2026 lawsuit by a food safety and animal welfare nonprofit alleged that Panera had misled customers about its animal welfare practices. The lawsuit claimed that Panera had marketed itself for its humane practices, including sourcing chicken from suppliers that provide sufficient living space for livestock, but that none of the chickens in its supply chain came from suppliers who met the standard.

=== Violation of California Labor Code ===
In 2009 and 2011, class-action lawsuits were filed by former workers, alleging that the company violated the California Labor Code, failed to pay overtime, failed to provide meal and rest periods, failed to pay employees upon termination, and violated California's Unfair Competition Law. Panera paid $5 million to settle all claims and denied any wrongdoing.

=== Racial discrimination allegation (2011) ===
In 2011, a former employee filed a racial discrimination lawsuit alleging that he was fired after repeatedly having a Black man work the cash register instead of putting him in a less visible location, and assigning "pretty young girls" as the cashiers, as requested by supervisors. The plaintiff also said he was fired after requesting another month off after returning from three months of sick leave. Panera said that it "does not discriminate based on national origin, race or sex" and that the plaintiff "was terminated because he had used all of his medical leave and was unable to return to work". The plaintiff worked in a store owned by franchisee Sam Covelli, who also owns the stores that were involved in the 2003 racial discrimination lawsuit. Covelli Enterprises is the single largest franchisee of Panera Bread with nearly 300 stores in Ohio, Pennsylvania, West Virginia, and Florida. The lawsuit was settled in June 2012.

=== Peanut butter allergy ===
In 2016, a lawsuit was filed after an employee at a Natick, Massachusetts, store put peanut butter on a sandwich, despite being informed that the person receiving the sandwich had a peanut allergy. The plaintiffs charged the company and those employees involved with intentional infliction of emotional distress and negligent infliction of emotional distress, as well as assault and battery. The recipient of the sandwich was hospitalized briefly.

=== Class action for failure to pay overtime wages (2017) ===
In December 2017, former employees filed a class action lawsuit against the company, claiming they were not paid overtime wages.

=== Tabler v. Panera LLC et al ===
In March 2019, Plaintiff Brianna Tabler in California filed a class-action lawsuit, accusing Panera of false advertising and fraud. While Panera's former CEO Ron Schaich claimed that Panera's menus continue to be completely void of artificial flavors, sweeteners, and ingredients, Tabler argues against the company's intentional redaction of the fact that their products contain traces of the synthetic biocide glyphosate. In October 2019, Judge Lucy Koh granted a motion to dismiss the lawsuit. Tabler filed an amended complaint in November 2019, to which Panera filed in January 2020 another motion to dismiss. Tabler filed a motion to voluntarily dismiss the complaint on July 30, 2020, closing the case.

=== Charged Lemonade lawsuits ===
On September 10, 2022, 21-year-old Sarah Katz, a student at the University of Pennsylvania, purchased and consumed a "supercharged" lemonade drink from a Panera location in Philadelphia. Allegedly, Katz was unaware of the high caffeine content of the drinks, which has been criticized as extremely dangerous; a 20-US-fluid-ounce (590 ml) Panera Charged Lemonade contained 260 mg of caffeine, equivalent to four espresso shots, and the 30-ounce (890 mL) lemonade contained 390 mg (six espressos). Katz suffered from Long QT Type 1 Syndrome, a heart condition that can result in an irregular heartbeat in certain situations. On the same day, Katz went into cardiac arrest while at another restaurant and was transported to the Pennsylvania Presbyterian Hospital, where she suffered another arrest and was then pronounced dead.

In October 2023, Katz's parents sued Panera for the wrongful death of their daughter caused by misleading labeling and description of the drink. Later in October, amid reports that dispensers had been moved behind the counter to limit access, Panera changed labeling for the drink, noting its caffeine content and need for moderation, and warning potentially sensitive consumers.

In December 2023, a second individual was reported as having died after consuming Panera's Charged Lemonade. The individual, Dennis Brown, died at age 46 after reportedly consuming three servings of Charged Lemonade at a Panera location in Fleming Island, Florida. Brown had high blood pressure, a developmental delay, attention deficit hyperactivity disorder (ADHD), and a chromosomal disorder that caused a mild intellectual disability and blurry vision, according to a wrongful death lawsuit filed by family members. Social media commentators began to nickname the drink "the lemonade that kills you".

The caffeine content was later reduced by Panera in December 2023, with the 30-ounce drink reduced to 237 mg and the 20-ounce to 158 mg. In May 2024, the company announced they would begin phasing out the drink.

=== Delivery costs ===
In February 2024, Panera settled a class-action lawsuit for $2 million, which accused the company a year beforehand of misleading customers from 2020 to 2021 about its costs for delivery orders. Panera did not admit fault in the settlement.

=== 2026 Data breach and class action ===
On January 28, 2026, Panera Bread was hit by a cyber attack, along with other companies including Bumble and Match. The company revealed that contact information was the data involved. Later reporting noted that the aggressor was ShinyHunters, that they stole information on around 5 million people (14 million records), and subsequently leaked this information to the dark web. Two class action lawsuits were filed against the company shortly after, citing Panera Bread's failure to properly secure the personal information that was stolen.

== See also ==
- List of bakeries
- List of fast food restaurant chains
- List of restaurant chains in the United States
