= Tatte Bakery & Café =

American restaurant chain

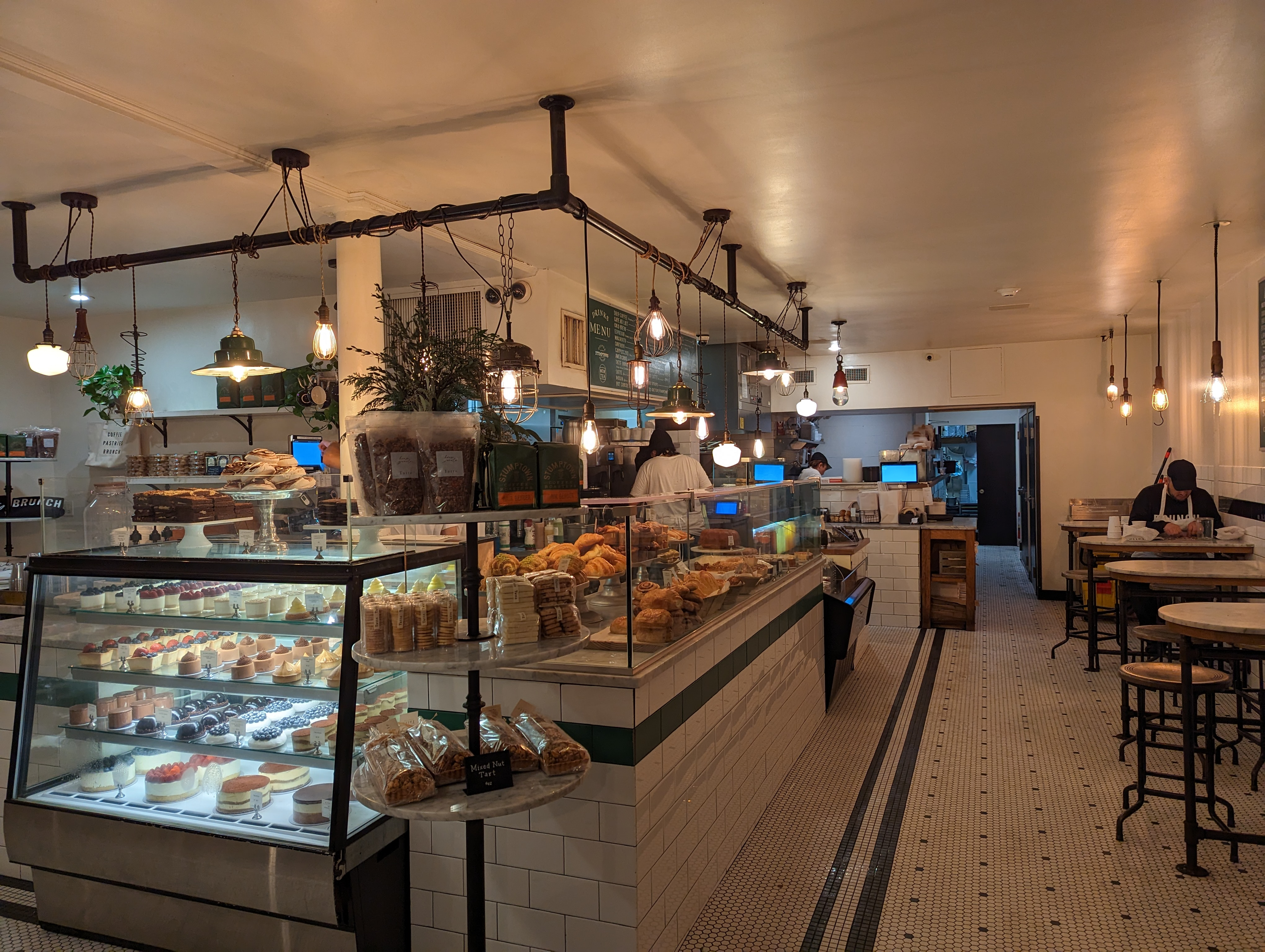
- Tatte's Beacon Hill location
- Industry: Fast casual restaurant, café, bakery
- Founded: 2007; 19 years ago in Boston
- Founder: Tzurit Or
- Headquarters: Cambridge, Massachusetts
- Area served: Boston, Massachusetts; Washington, D.C. area; New York Tri-State area
- Key people: Tzurit Or (Chief Creative Officer)
- Website: tattebakery.com

Tatte Bakery & Café is an American-Mediterranean gourmet fast-casual bakery and café founded by Israeli-born Tzurit Or. As of November 2026, Tatte operates 54 locations, with half in the Boston area, and the remainder in the metro D.C. region and New York Tri-State area.

== History ==
Tzurit Or, a former film producer who immigrated from Israel to the United States in 2003, began baking family recipes in her kitchen, first selling them in 2007 at the Copley Square Farmers Market in Boston, Massachusetts. She baked for 20 hours a day to keep up with the demand.

After one summer at the farmers market, in May 2008, she opened her first brick and mortar storefront, Tatte Fine Cookies & Cakes, in the town of Brookline, Massachusetts. In the coming years, Or began moving into the greater Boston area. She expanded into the Kendall Square neighborhood of Cambridge in 2012, opening three locations in Cambridge within two years. Or's fifth storefront opened in 2015 on Beacon Hill's historic Charles Street, the first Tatte location in Boston proper. After opening a spacious Harvard Square location in 2016, Or began ramping up expansion in the Boston area. Tatte expanded into downtown Boston in 2019 with its Summer Street location, followed by a location at One Boston Place.

In August 2020, Tatte opened its first Washington, D.C. bakery in the West End neighborhood, subsequently expanding into U Street/Cardozo and Dupont Circle, then into the D.C. suburbs of Bethesda, Maryland and Arlington, Virginia.

In 2025, Tatte announced the opening of many locations across the New York Tri-State area. Locations in New York and New Jersey opened in late 2025 and early 2026, and a location in Connecticut is slated to open at the end of 2026.

=== Leadership ===
Ron Shaich, who then became CEO of Panera Bread, purchased over 50% ownership of Tatte in 2016. After Shaich parted ways with Panera, he bought Panera's stake in Tatte and continues to be a lead investor. Despite Shaich's majority stake, Tatte continues to operate as an independent company. Or stepped down as CEO in July 2020 following discrimination complaints. After Or stepped down, Chuck Chapman—former restaurant C-suite executive at Panera Bread, Dairy Queen, and Bruegger's Bagels—served as CEO until February 2024. Another restaurant industry executive, Shawn Utke, served as CEO for about a year after until late 2025. As of November 2026, Tatte does not appear to have a CEO.

== Food ==
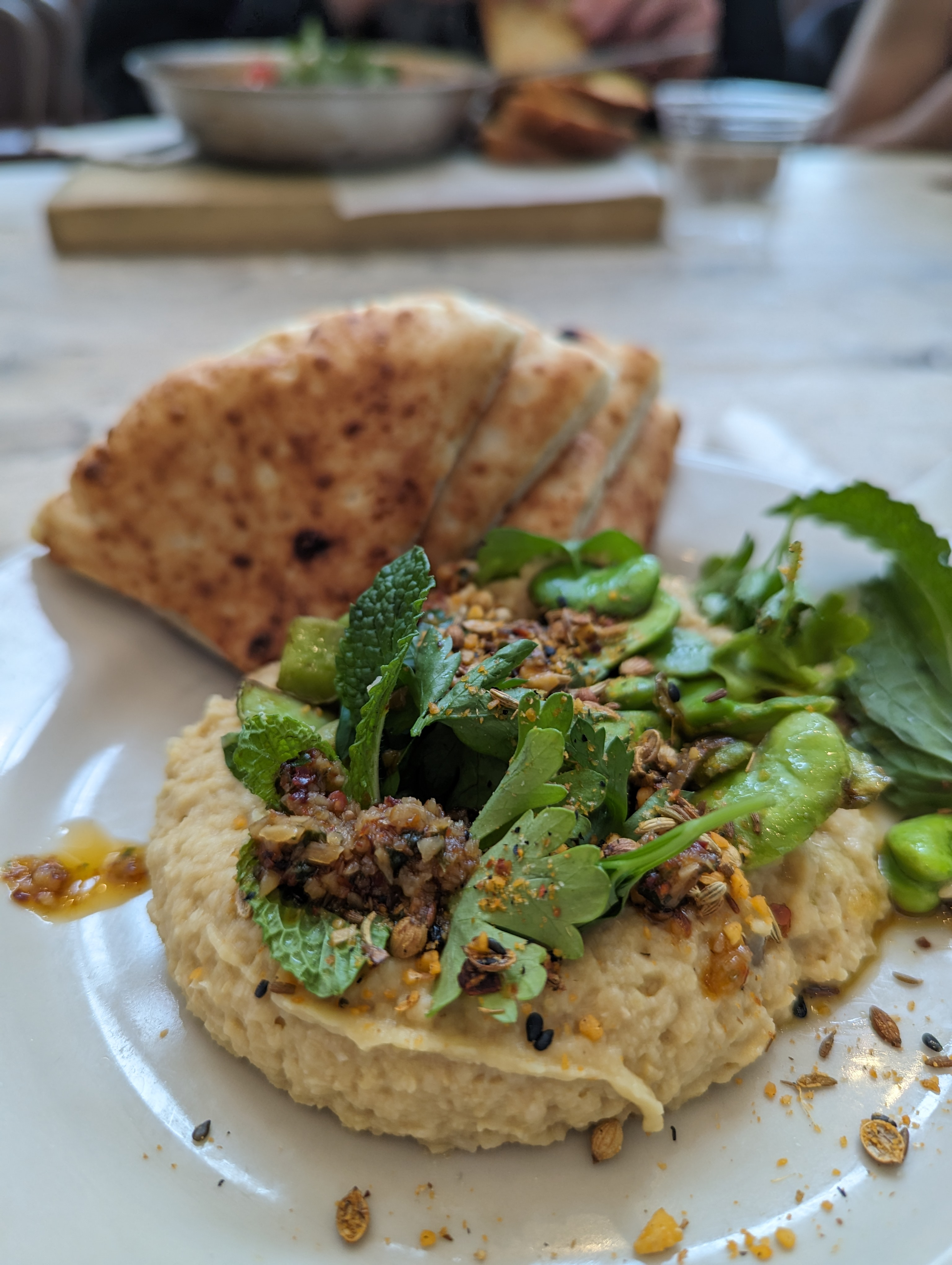
Tatte's chickpea and fava plate

Tatte features Israeli, Mediterranean, American, and European flavors, offering a variety of pastries, breakfast dishes, sandwiches, salads, soups, and their signature Shakshuka. The café also has a wide range of coffee and tea. Tatte also has special catering bakery orders for holidays, including Thanksgiving, Rosh Hashanah, Yom Kippur break fast, Passover, and Easter.

== Name ==
The correct pronunciation of Tatte rhymes with "latte."

Or's daughter inspired the bakery's name. Although Tatte means "daddy" in Yiddish, young Hebrew speakers often say "tatte" in place of the Hebrew word for grandmother, which is "savta." While Or was working on her farmers market stand logo, her young daughter said "tatte" out loud when looking at a photo of her grandmother, which led Or to name her farmer's market stand "Tatte."

== Current locations ==
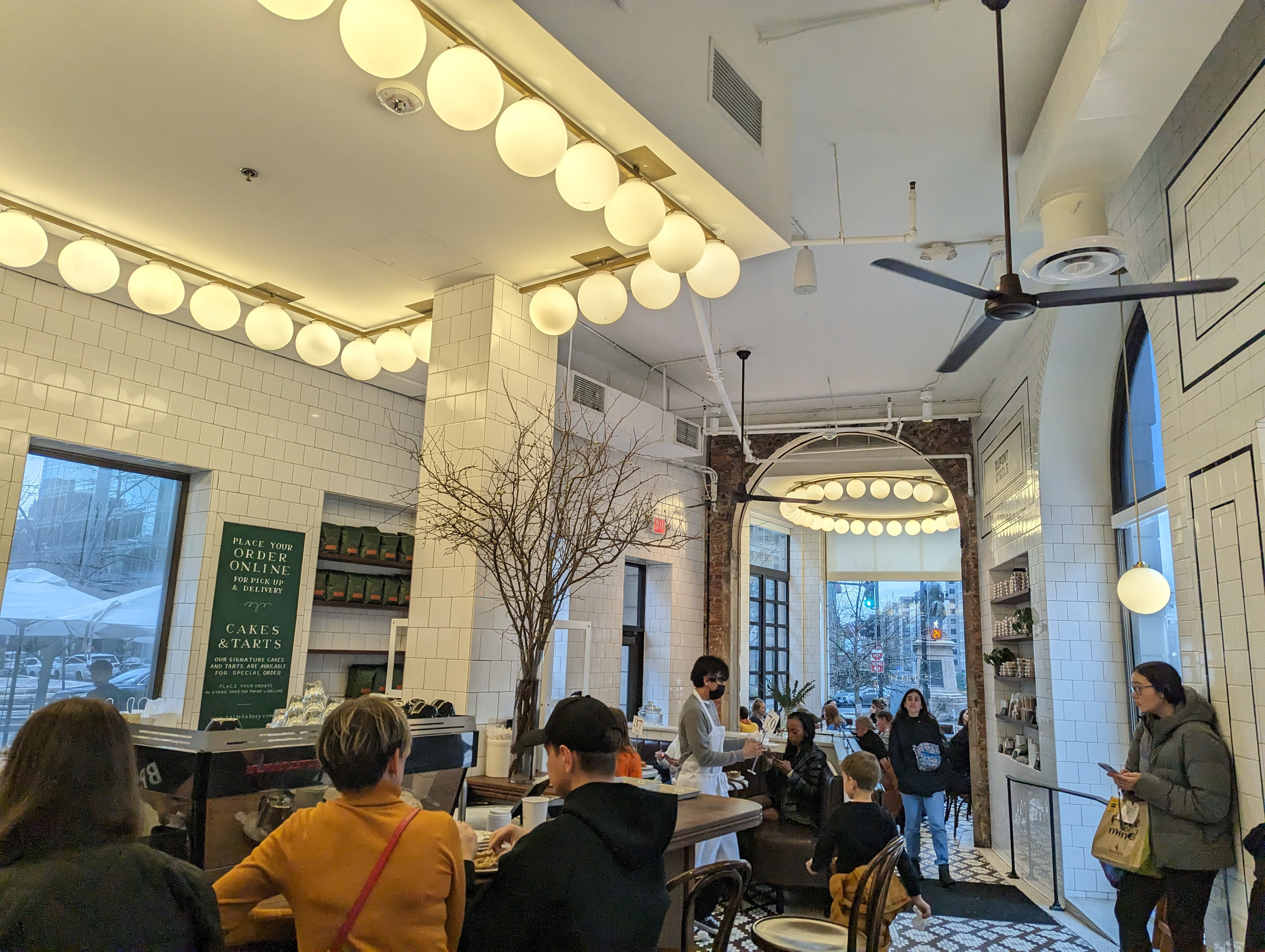
Tatte location in Dupont Circle, Washington, D.C.

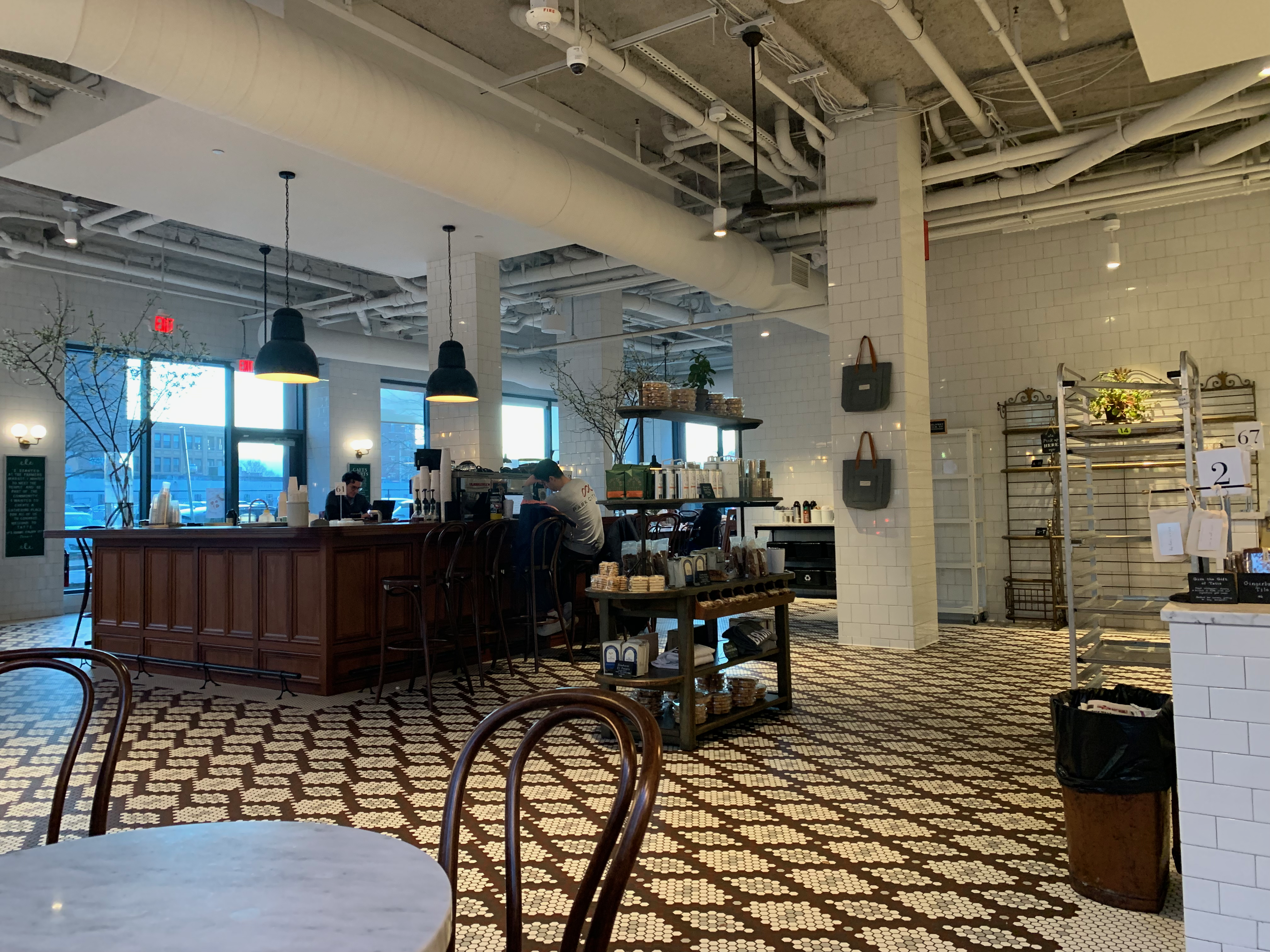
Tatte in Boston, Ink Block

=== Greater Boston metropolitan area ===
Tatte's 28 Boston area stores are located in Arlington, Belmont, Boston, Brookline, Burlington, Cambridge, Hingham, Lexington, Newton, Somerville, and Wellesley. Tatte also has locations on the campuses of three universities in the city of Boston: Berklee College of Music, Emerson College, and Northeastern University.

=== D.C. metropolitan area ===
Tatte's Washington, D.C. area stores include locations in West End, Dupont Circle, and Foggy Bottom, as well as Maryland and Virginia. Tatte's seven locations in Virginia are all in Northern Virginia suburbs of D.C., including right outside the district in Alexandria County and Arlington County, as well as slightly further out in Ashburn, Fairfax County, Falls Church, and Reston. Tatte has three locations right outside of D.C. in Montgomery County's Bethesda and Rockville neighborhoods in addition to one location further away from the D.C. area in Maryland's capital city, Annapolis. As of November 2026, Tatte has 21 total locations in Washington, D.C., Maryland, and Virginia.

=== New York metropolitan area ===
Tatte's New York metropolitan area locations include Gramercy Park in Manhattan, Garden City on Long Island, as well as New Jersey stores in Paramus, Morristown, and Ridgewood. In 2027, Tatte will open locations on the Upper East Side of Manhattan and in Darien, Connecticut.
