= Doane Pet Care =

American pet food manufacturer

Doane Pet Care (DPC) was a leading manufacturer of dry pet food and pet snacks and treats in the United States.

It was founded in 1954 as the Doane Products Co., making dried molasses feed for livestock. In 1959, Doane started making its first pet food product, a meal-based dog food.

In 1970, Doane was enlisted by Wal-Mart to make its private label dog food. In 1998, the name Doane Pet Care was formed as a result of the merger of Doane Products Co. and Brentwood, Tenn.-based Windy Hill Pet Food.

== Production ==
DPC manufactured store brands for its retail customers and national brands for consumer pet food companies; it also produced and sold its own regional brands. Its products included more than 200 national and regional store brands. It was headquartered in Brentwood, Tennessee.

In 2006, DPC was acquired by Mars Inc., a leading manufacturer of Pedigree dog food.
