= Lazydays =

American recreational vehicles company

Lazydays RV
- Traded as: Nasdaq: GORV; Russell Microcap Index component
- Industry: Recreational vehicles
- Founded: 1976; 50 years ago
- Founder: Herman Wallace; Ron Wallace; Don Wallace
- Headquarters: Tampa, Florida, USA
- Area served: Milwaukee, Wisconsin; Elkhart, Indiana; Wilmington, Ohio; Ramsey, Minnesota; Monticello, Minnesota; Nashville, Tennessee; Council Bluffs, Iowa; Turkey Creek, Tennessee; Tulsa, Oklahoma; Fort Pierce, Florida; Saint George, Utah; Phoenix, Arizona; Las Vegas, Nevada; Portland, Oregon; Vancouver, Washington; Tampa, Florida; The Villages, Florida; Tucson, Arizona; Loveland, Colorado; Denver, Colorado; Minneapolis, Minnesota; Knoxville, Tennessee; Houston, Texas
- Key people: Tim Sheehan (former CEO, 2012-16); William Murnane (Former Chairman & CEO); Ronald Fleming (Interim CEO)
- Products: Recreational vehicles
- Owner: Don Wallace (1993-2004); Campers Inn RV (2025-present)
- Website: www.lazydays.com

Lazydays RV is an American company specializing in the sales and service of recreational vehicles, RV rentals, parts and accessories. Based in Seffner, Florida, it was founded in 1976 and operates 21 locations in 15 states, including Tucson, Arizona; Denver, Loveland, Colorado and Elkhart, Indiana, Minneapolis, Minnesota; Knoxville, Tennessee; Houston, Texas; The Villages, Florida.

In parallel with its rebranding strategy, Lazydays Holdings ceased trading as "LAZY" on Nasdaq on January 17, 2024, and adopted "GORV" as its new ticker. Lazydays RV is the exclusive RV sponsor of the Florida Gators, Tampa Bay Buccaneers and the Denver Broncos.

== RV dealership ==
It positions itself as the world's largest RV dealership, with 3,000 new and used RVs from 78 manufacturers across their 21 locations, nearly 400 service bays, 700 campsites at 2 on-site campgrounds and an RV resort at their Florida location. In addition to having a store dedicated to specialty and OEM parts called Accessories & More in each location, it also has a fleet of rental vehicles at its Colorado locations.

Lazydays RV's claim to being the world's largest RV dealership is open to interpretation. Camping World Holdings, Inc.(CWH) has 202 locations and five million active customers according to the 10-K Annual report filed with the FTC on February 26, 2024.

== History ==
Founded in Tampa, Florida in 1976 with just two travel trailers and $500, Lazydays RV was originally owned by the Wallace family, which included Herman and his sons Don and Ron. Herman retired in 1993 and Don took over the business.

During its first five years, the dealerships limited itself to selling travel trailers and mini motorhomes. Sales grew to $13 million by 1980 and $50 million by 1983.

Lazydays RV established a second location in 2011 in Tucson, Arizona, when it purchased a dealership owned by Beaudry RV. The firm acquired several dealerships in Colorado from RV America and Discount RV Corner, which are located in Denver and Loveland.

In August 2018, after becoming home to the world's largest indoor showroom with the acquisition of the dealership in Loveland, the company purchased Shorewood RV in Anoka, Minnesota. Two months later, Lazydays RV brought its total number of dealerships to 6 with the purchase of Tennessee RV in Knoxville, Tennessee.

In August 2019, it purchased Alliance Coach in Wildwood, Florida, which it would rename Lazydays RV of The Villages. In February 2020, Lazydays opened its first Texas location, Lazydays RV Service Center of Houston in Waller, Texas.

In 2025, it was announced that Campers Inn RV had completed the acquisition of the company and would become the operator of seven locations.

== Sponsorships ==
In 2015, Lazydays RV announced their partnership with the University of Florida Gators. to sponsor sanctioned tailgating events held in the campus RV lots for official college sports events. In 2016, Lazydays RV announced a partnership with the NFL's Denver Broncos and Tampa Bay Buccaneers.
