= Au Bon Pain =

American bakery and cafe chain

ABP OPCO, LLC.

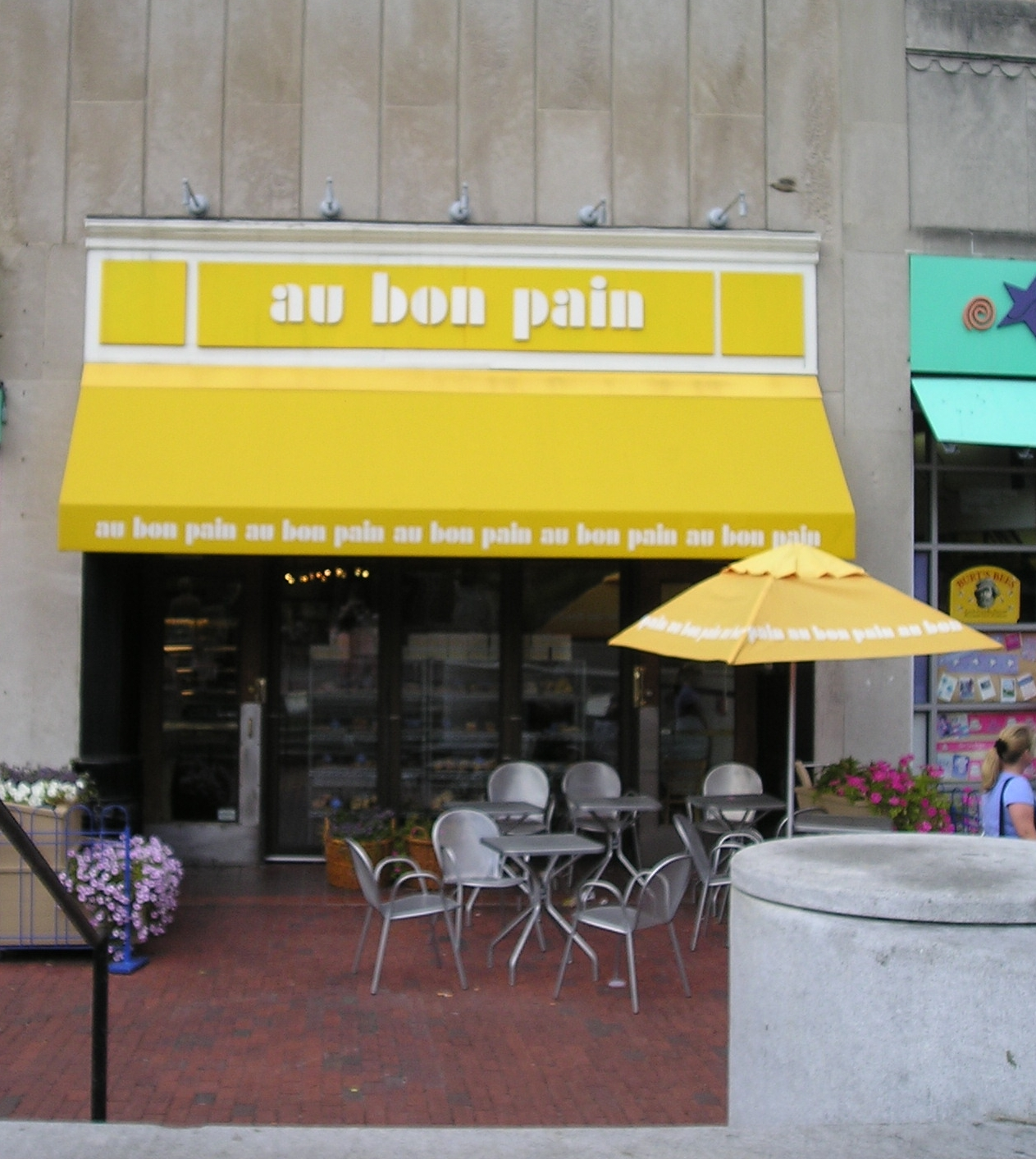
- Au Bon Pain, Harvard Square, 2005
- Trade name: Au Bon Pain
- Type: Subsidiary
- Industry: Fast-casual restaurant, bakery, and café
- Founded: 1976; 50 years ago in Boston
- Founder: Louis Rapuano; Louis I. Kane
- Headquarters: Richardson, Texas, United States
- Number of locations: 34 (2025)
- Area served: United States; Canada; Thailand
- Products: Breakfast; lunch
- Owner: AMPEX Brands
- Website: aubonpain.com

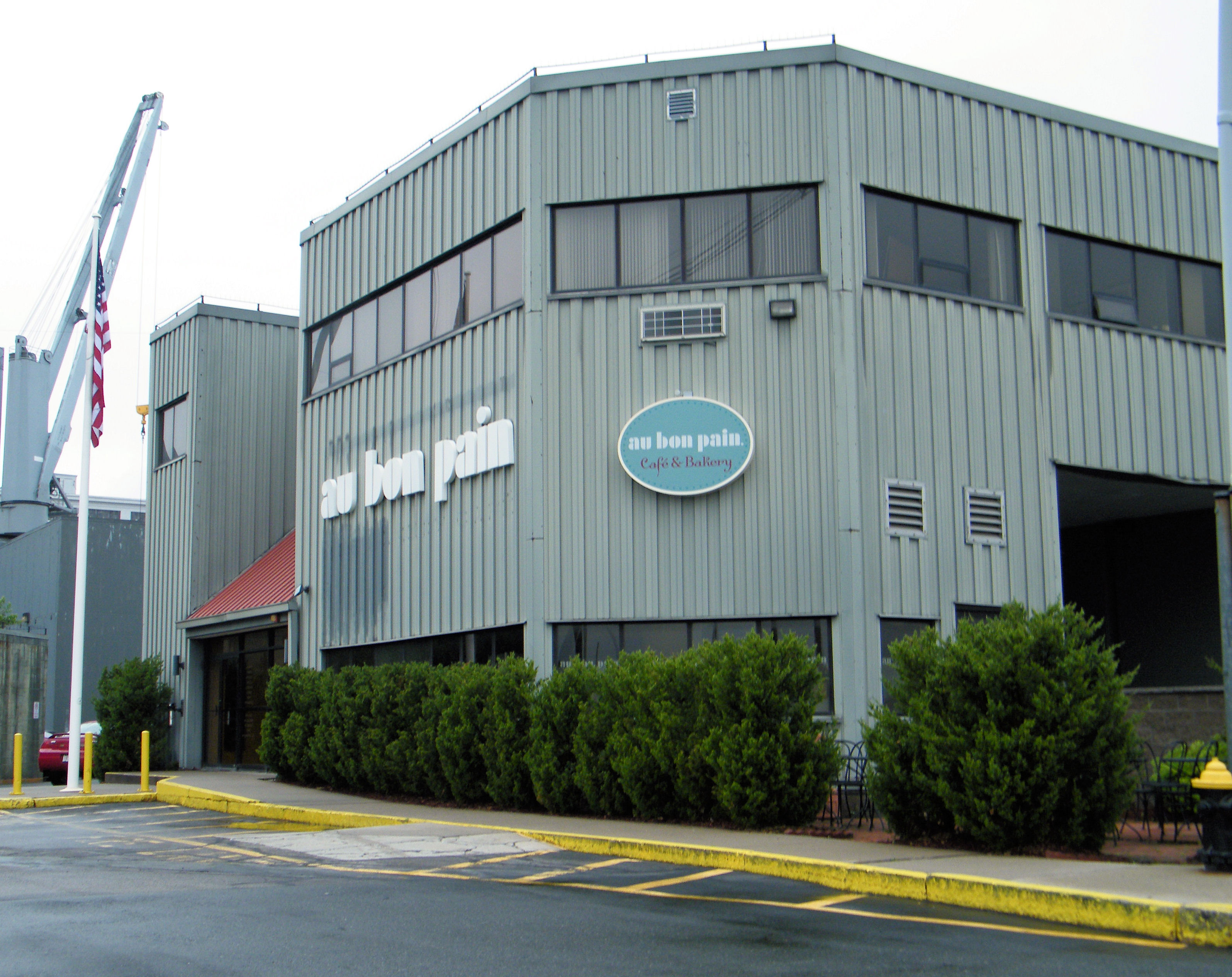
Former Au Bon Pain headquarters in Boston

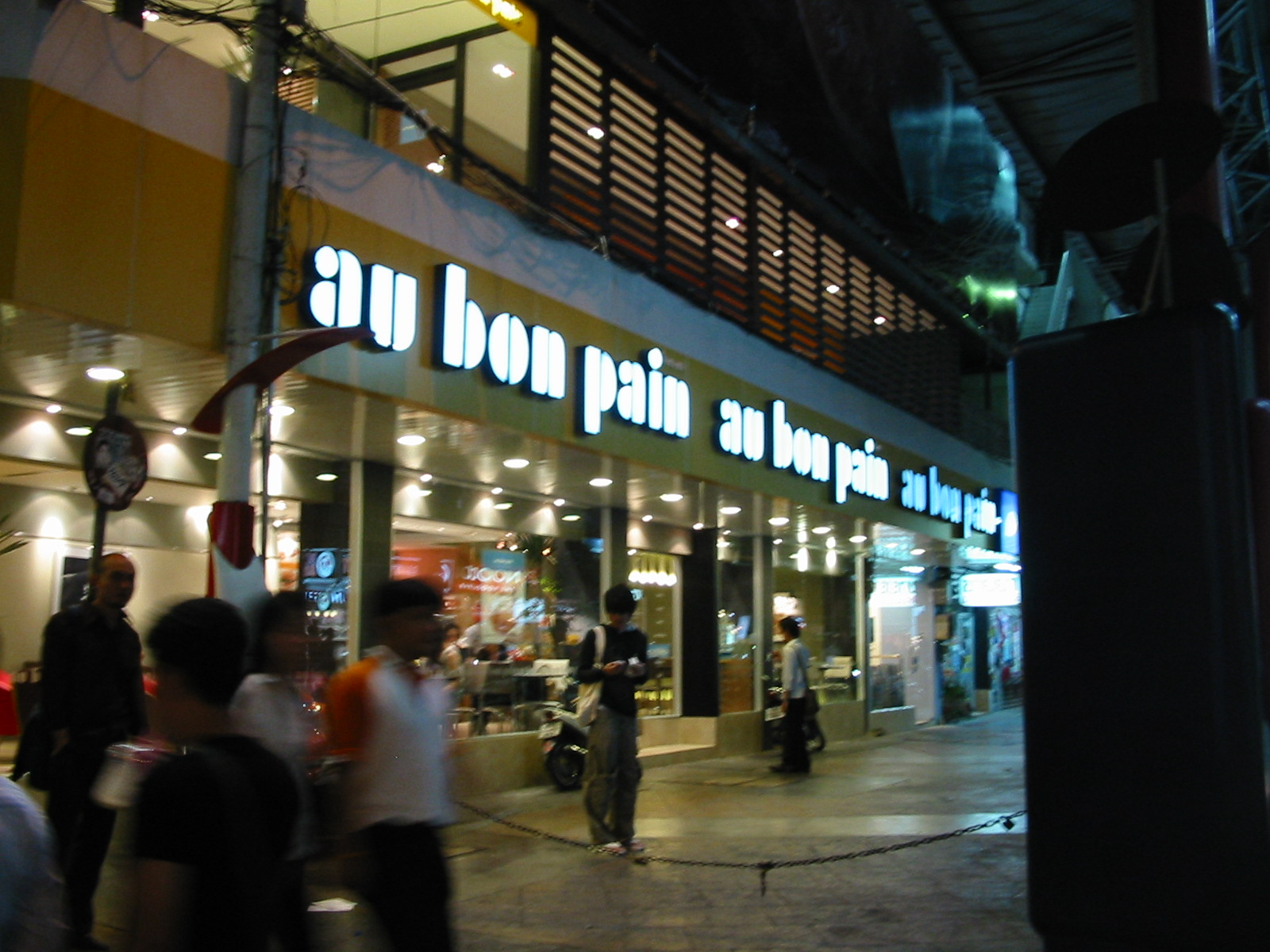
Au Bon Pain at Siam Square in Bangkok

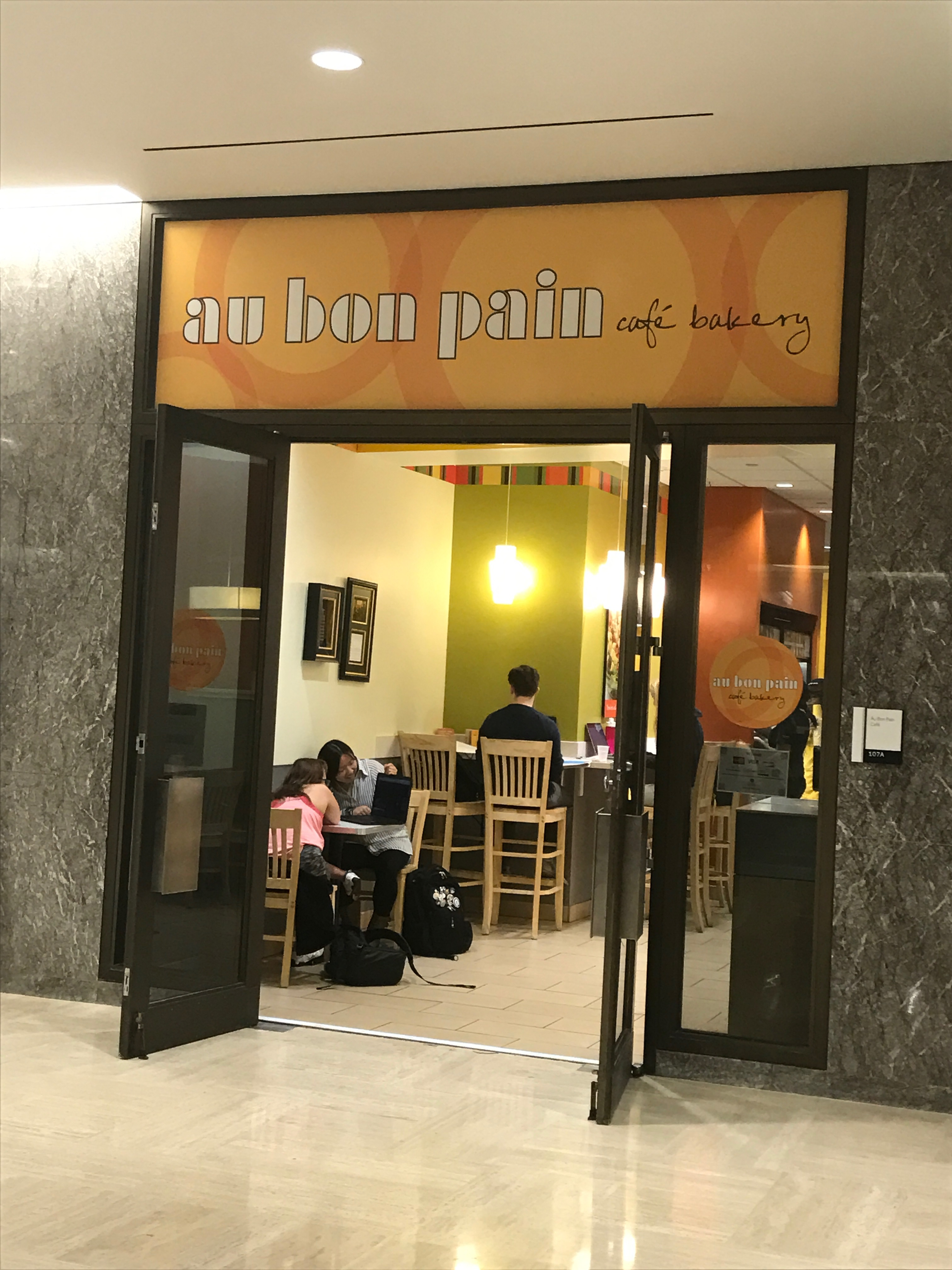
Au Bon Pain in the Hesburgh Library at the University of Notre Dame

ABP OPCO, LLC, doing business as Au Bon Pain, (French pronunciation: [o bɔ̃ pɛ̃], meaning "at the good bread") is an American fast casual restaurant, bakery, and café chain headquartered in Richardson, Texas, which as of 2025 operated 34 locations in the United States as well as several outlets in Thailand. The company is owned by the Yum! Brands franchisee management company AMPEX Brands.

Au Bon Pain serves baked goods such as bread, pastries, croissants, bagels, as well as tea, coffee, and espresso beverages; breakfast foods such as egg sandwiches; and lunch items such as soups, salads, and sandwiches. The company also offers catering services.

Most Au Bon Pain locations are on the East Coast of the United States, with franchise locations in 14 states around the country, as of 2025.

== History ==
Au Bon Pain was established in 1976 at the Faneuil Hall marketplace in Boston by the French baking equipment manufacturer Pavailler. Conceived as a showcase for Pavailler's ovens, the company was founded by Louis Rapuano, Pavailler, and two minor investors, with Pavailler providing the baking machinery. Its early locations sold croissants, pastries, and bread made by French bakers, and by 1977, Au Bon Pain had opened additional stores in Hackensack, New Jersey, and New York City.

In 1978, venture capitalist Louis I. Kane acquired the company for US$1.5 million (equivalent to US$7.4 million in 2025), after being drawn in by the smell of its baked goods. Kane shifted the brand's focus from selling ovens to baked products directly to customers. Francois Marin was hired to open and manage the first Au Bon Pain café in Boston's Quincy Market.

By 1980, Au Bon Pain's sales had surpassed US$1 million (equivalent to US$3.9 million in 2025), though the company remained unprofitable. Facing financial difficulties, Au Bon Pain was nearing bankruptcy in 1981, when Ronald M. Shaich and his father acquired a 60 percent stake, setting it on a new course.

The company went public in 1991 through an initial public offering. Two years later, it purchased the Saint Louis Bread Company, the precursor to Panera Bread, for US$23 million (equivalent to US$51.3 million in 2025), and acquired the U.S. bakery locations of Warburtons, which were converted into Au Bon Pain cafés.

The mid-1990s brought mixed fortunes: after reporting losses in 1996, the company announced plans to upgrade its store interiors, and in 1997, it explored options to expand to Peru.

In 1999, Au Bon Pain Co. Inc.—later renamed Panera Bread—sold its Au Bon Pain division to Bruckmann, Rosser, Sherrill & Co., and the following year, Compass Group acquired it. That same year, the company signed a franchise agreement with Gourmet Coffee Co. Ltd. to open its first cafés in Taipei, Taiwan.

One of its stores operated in the underground mall of the World Trade Center in New York City until it was destroyed in the September 11 attacks.

In 2005, Au Bon Pain's management, together with PNC Financial Services, purchased a 75 percent share of the company from Compass, which retained the remaining 25 percent. Three years later, LNK Partners acquired a controlling interest.

During the 2010s, Au Bon Pain launched a nationwide remodeling program, expanded to more than 200 locations, and committed to sourcing only free-range eggs by 2017. Under CEO Sue Morelli, it was recognized as one of Massachusetts' top female-led companies in 2014, and in 2015, the company named Katherine See its executive chef. Morelli retired in 2016 and was succeeded by Ray Blanchette.

On November 8, 2017, Panera Bread announced its acquisition of Au Bon Pain, reuniting the two brands after nearly two decades apart. Following the deal, founder Ron Shaich stepped down as Panera's CEO and was succeeded by Blaine Hurst.

After years of declining urban foot traffic, the chain closed its final Cambridge, Massachusetts café in 2019, and in 2021, the company was sold again—this time to AMPEX Brands, which acquired roughly $60 million in assets and franchise rights for 131 additional locations. AMPEX moved the headquarters from Boston to Texas.

The COVID-19 pandemic caused further closures, reducing the U.S. store count to 123, though new openings began under AMPEX's ownership, including one in Queens Center Mall in New York City. The last remaining Boston location, at South Station, closed in 2024.

== See also ==
- List of coffeehouse chains
- List of bakery cafés
