= Jonathan Hirschfeld =

Israeli painter, curator, columnist and educator (-1979)

Jonathan Hirschfeld יונתן הירשפלד
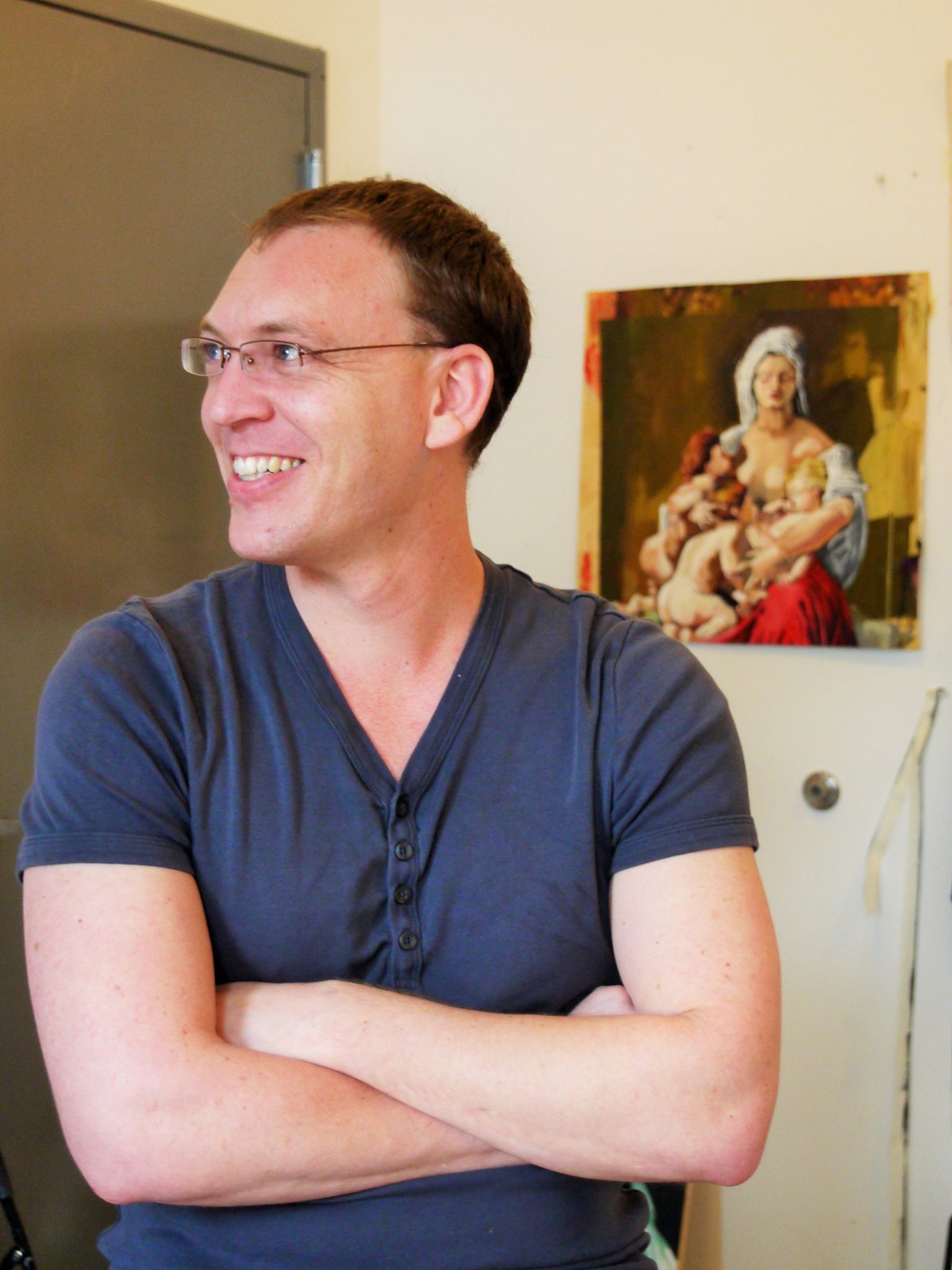
- Jonathan Hirschfeld
- Born: 1979 (age 46–47); Jerusalem, Israel
- Education: Bezalel Academy of Arts and Design, Tel Aviv University
- Known for: Painting, lecturing, curating, writing
- Movement: Israeli art
- Awards: Ministry of Culture and Sports Prize

Jonathan Hirschfeld (Hebrew: יונתן הירשפלד; born 1979) is an Israeli artist, lecturer, educator, curator, and an essayist. He is an art columnist for Haaretz newspaper since 2001. Presented solo exhibitions at Ramat Gan Museum of Israeli Art, Raw Art Gallery, Jerusalem Artists House, and Givon Gallery. Participated in group exhibitions at the Jerusalem Print Workshop, Sommer Contemporary Art, Haifa Museum of Art, Mishkan Museum of Art, Umm al-Fahm Art Gallery, Bible Lands Museum, and the Tel Aviv Museum of Art. His work is in the collection of the Israel Museum.

== Biography ==
Jonathan Hirschfeld was born and raised in Jerusalem. He graduated from the Charles E. Smith Jerusalem High School for the Arts in 1993. In 2004, he earned a BFA from the Bezalel Academy of Arts and Design and a teaching diploma from the Hebrew University of Jerusalem. He completed an MA in Interdisciplinary Arts from Tel Aviv University in 2011. In 2008, Jonathan Hirschfeld and Yakir Segev established Hanina Gallery. In 2009, the gallery became a cooperative. By 2026, it had hosted over one hundred exhibitions.

He published a series of articles in which he argued that postmodern thought from the school of Derrida, Foucault, Baudrillard, and Deleuze enjoys total hegemony in the Israeli art world, and he attempted to point out the failures and damages of this philosophy.

In 2013, he painted the series of paintings "On the Land," which was exhibited at Mishkenot Sha'ananim. In this series, he referenced the "Tzova" paintings of Joseph Zaritsky and Larry Abramson and the ethical and aesthetic discussion arising from the encounter between the three generations of artists. In 2016, this series of paintings was exhibited as part of the exhibition "A New Horizon for New Horizons", Mishkan Museum of Art, Ein Harod. In 2014, Hirschfeld presented the solo exhibition "Lust" at the "Zadik" Gallery in Jaffa-Tel Aviv and published a poetry book of the same name in collaboration with Aharon Shabtai.

In 2016, he won the Ministry of Culture and Sports Prize for Encouraging Creativity in the Plastic Arts.

In 2021, he published his book "To Know Painting" through Resling Publishing. The book compiles columns he published from 2013 to 2020 in the "Picture" section of the "Culture and Literature" supplement of Haaretz. He published songs in Mitaam - Journal for literature and radical thinking, essays in Odyssey - A journey between ideas, Alaxon, Maala - Journal for criticism, and art criticism in Erev-Rav. The Gordon Gallery published two books containing essays on the gallery's artists, in 2021 and 2026, with Hirschfeld authoring most of the texts.

Presents the art segment on the radio program "Three Who Know," broadcast on the Kan Tarbut station.

He taught at the Gilo High School, Jerusalem; Charles A. Smith High School for the Arts, Jerusalem; High School of the Arts, Tel Aviv, Muses; Ironi Alef High School; The Atelier, Tel Aviv,; The Kibbutz Artists' Workshop; the Institute for Israeli Art; and at the Eretz Israel Museum.

Gideon Ofrat's essay analyzes Jonathan Hirschfeld's art as a rejection of local traditions of the Want of Matter, in favor of European aesthetics, myths, and Christian motifs. It highlights a thematic duality where baroque decorations and classical imagery are juxtaposed with violence and decay to explore the link between extreme beauty and historical evil. Hirschfeld utilizes these frameworks, along with references to his family history and military traumas, as an allegory connecting European fascist legacies to contemporary local violence.

== Selected solo exhibitions ==
- 2004 Molech, Bar David Museum, Bar'am.
- 2006 Perfume, Jerusalem Artists House, Jerusalem.
- 2009 Afterthought, dual exhibition with Jonathan Ofek, Givat Haim Art Gallery, Givat Haim (Meuhad).
- 2010 He Who Wanted to be God, Ramat Gan Museum of Israeli Art, Ramat Gan.
- 2012 The Tragedy in Ethical Life, Raw Art Gallery, Tel Aviv.
- 2014 Lust, exhibition and book, Zadik Gallery, Tel Aviv.
- 2014 Foramen magnum, Raw Art Gallery, Tel Aviv.
- 2015 Angles in New York, Permanent mural, 7 Park Avenue, New York, NYC.
- 2016 Skin for Skin, Artist House, Tel Aviv.
- 2018 Broken Cisterns, Givon Gallery, Tel Aviv.
- 2018 Animaletters, Hanina Contemporary Art, Tel Aviv.
- 2018 On Life and Death, Art Gallery at the Memorial Center Tivon, Kiryat Tiv'on.
- 2022 Adam’s first domestic pet after the expulsion from paradise was the serpent, Schechter Gallery, Tel Aviv.
- 2022 The cop, The chambermaid, and the chimney sweeper, ND Gallery, Ramat Gan.
- 2022 The Fourth Part (with Tziki Eisenberg) Hanina Gallery, Tel Aviv.
- 2022 Mostly Ballpoint pen (with Tamar Simon), Nulobaz Gallery, Tel Aviv.
- 2023 The life of Joseph, Givon Gallery, Tel Aviv.

== Selected group exhibitions ==
- 2007 Desert Generation: Israeli and Palestinian Artists against the Occupation, Jerusalem Artists House, Jerusalem.
- 2007 Traces III: The Third Biennale for Drawing in Israel, Artists' House, Jerusalem. Jerusalem Print Workshop, Jerusalem. Barbur Gallery, Jerusalem. Agripas 12 Cooperative Gallery, Jerusalem.
- 2011 The Last Emperor - Young Artists with Igael Tumarkin, Hezi Cohen Gallery, Tel Aviv.
- 2011 Crescendo, Sommer Contemporary Art, with Igael Tumarkin and Tsuki Garbian, Tel Aviv.
- 2011 Room 310, site-specific permanent exhibition at Artplus Hotel, Tel Aviv.
- 2011 Turning Point 5, Raw Art Gallery, Tel Aviv.
- 2012 The Specialists, Hanina Gallery, Tel Aviv.
- 2012 Window to Reality: Israeli Homages to the Italian Renaissance Art, Open University of Israel, Ra'anana.
- 2012 Friday, Sunday - After, Ramat Gan Museum of Israeli Art, Ramat Gan.
- 2012 Hot Summer, Cabri Gallery of Contemporary Art, Kabri.
- 2013 Tumarkin, Hezi Cohen Gallery, Tel Aviv.
- 2013 Making School, Haifa Museum of Art, Haifa.
- 2013 A Couples Exhibition, Hanina Gallery, Tel Aviv.
- 2014 Under Erasure, Tel Aviv Museum of Art.
- 2014 Umm al-Fahm Art Gallery, Umm al-Fahm.
- 2014 Money, Zadik - Art Within Reach, Jaffa.
- 2015 Uniting, Hanina Gallery, Tel Aviv, Israel.
- 2016 The Yearning for Myth, Haifa Museum of Art, Haifa.
- 2016 A New Horizon for New Horizons, Mishkan Museum of Art, Ein Harod (Meuhad).
- 2016 Helmets and Skulls, The Bar David Museum for Art and Judaica, Kibbutz Bar'am.
- 2016 The Black Art, Rosenfeld Gallery, Tel Aviv.
- 2016 Group Exhibition, Artists' House, Jerusalem.
- 2017 Flaying, Hanina Contemporary Art, Tel Aviv.
- 2017 We Hereby Declare: 2016 Ministry of Culture Awards for Visual Art and Design, MoBY - Museums of Bat Yam, Bat Yam.
- 2017 Model: Hoamge to Eliyahu Gat, Alfred Cooperative Institute for Art & Culture, Tel Aviv.
- 2018 Pillar of Cloud, Hermann Struck Museum, Haifa Museums.
- 2018 About heroes, Art Gallery at the Memorial Center Tivon, Kiryat Tiv'on.
- 2018 21 Grams, Beita Jerusalem, Jerusalem.
- 2018 Money with a Capital M, Haifa Museum of Art, Haifa.
- 2019 Artist wall, N.D. Gallery, Ramat Gan.
- 2019 Drawing Attention, Givon Art Gallery, Tel Aviv.
- 2019 Zaritsky Artists House, Tel Aviv.
- 2019 Naked Soul: Chaïm Soutine and Israeli Art, Mishkan Museum of Art, Ein Harod (Meuhad).
- 2019 Crimes and Misdemeanors, Artists' House, Tel Aviv.
- 2020 Self-portrait : one can only depict oneself, City Gallery, Kfar Saba.
- 2020 Layer operation, Kupferman Collection House, Lohamei HaGeta'ot.
- 2020 Elective Affinities, Trumpeldor Gallery: Art Center, Ben-Gurion University of the Negev, Beersheba.
- 2021 Counterbalance, Givon Gallery, Tel Aviv.
- 2021 Digging Down – Art of the Pre-Future, Bible Lands Museum, Jerusalem.
- 2022 Traces VIII – More Than One, Artists' House, Jerusalem.
- 2022 Out of the 2020s #1, Givon Art Gallery, Tel Aviv.
- 2022 Joint Exhibition, Hanina Contemporary Art, Tel Aviv.
- 2022 Joint Exhibition with Tamar Simon, Nulobaz, Tel Aviv.
- 2022 Jerusalem Print Workshop, Jerusalem.
- 2022 Had Gadya: The Horror Cycle, Artists' House, Jerusalem.
- 2023 This Is All the Magic, Bar-David Museum of Art and Judaica, Bar'am.
- 2023 Summer exhibition, Givon Art Gallery, Tel Aviv.
- 2024 SEL-E-ECTION, Givon Art Gallery, Tel Aviv.
- 2024 Masterpieces, Mishkan Museum of Art.
- 2024 Pamphlets, Alma Home for Hebrew Culture, Tel Aviv.
- 2025 Givon Art Gallery, Tel Aviv.
- 2025 White days, Maya Gallery, Tel Aviv.

== Curator ==
- 2011 Crescendo, Sommer Contemporary Art, Tel Aviv.
- 2011 The Specialists, Hanina Contemporary Art, Tel Aviv (curated with Yael Azoulay).
- 2011 Octopus : nine contemporary artists from Hong Kong, Hanina Contemporary Art, Tel Aviv (curated with Amir Pollak).
- 2012 Dual Exhibition, Hanina Contemporary Art, Tel Aviv (curated with Yael Azoulay).
- 2014 Into the water, Hanina Contemporary Art, Tel Aviv.
- 2016 Vered Aharonovitch, Passover Seder, Hanina Contemporary Art, Tel Aviv.
- 2017 Flaying, Hanina Contemporary Art, Tel Aviv.
- 2019 Ariel Asseo, Not Here, Not Now, Hanina Contemporary Art, Tel Aviv.
- 2022 Shlomi Lellouche, An Inverted World I Beheld, Hezi Cohen Gallery.
- 2022 Orit Akta, Paint an Eternal Present, Zemack Contemporary Art, Tel Aviv.
- 2023 Carmela Weiss, Ylem, P8 Gallery, Tel Aviv.

== Collections ==
- Israel Museum.

== Books and catalogues ==
- 2010 He Who Wanted to be God, Ramat Gan Museum of Israeli Art, exhibition catalogue, texts: Ayelet Shachar Hacohen, Gideon Ofrat.
- 2013 On the Land, Dwek Gallery, Mishkenot Sha'ananim, Jerusalem, exhibition catalogue, curator and text: Ron Bartos.
- 2014, Lust, poetry book, with Aharon Shabtai, Brosh Publishing; Including an essay: "New Goddesses: On Jonathan Hirschfeld's Lust Painting Cycle", by the book's editor Ron Bartos.
- 2016 The essay "Toward a Postmodern World", in the book The Post-Human Era: from fantasy to eternal life to existential panic (editors: Yochai Ataria and Amichai Shalev), Pardes Publishing, pp. 275–286.
- 2018 Broken Cisterns, exhibition catalogue, Givon Gallery, Tel Aviv, text: Oded Wolkstein.
- 2018 an article in Pamela Levy, 1949–2004, exhibition catalogue, Tel Aviv Museum publisher.
- 2018 About heroes, Art Gallery at the Memorial Center Tivon, Kiryat Tiv'on, exhibition catalogue.
- 2018 Animaletters, written by Yakir Segev; illustrated by Jonathan Hirschfeld, Hanina.
- 2018 On Life and Death, Art Gallery at the Memorial Center Tivon, exhibition catalogue, text and curator: Michal Shachnai Yacobi.
- 2020 Layer operation, Kupferman Collection House, Lohamei HaGeta'ot, exhibition catalogue.
- 2020 Essay in the exhibition catalogue, Anna Fromchenko: 245, Braverman Gallery, Tel Aviv.
- 2020 The essay "On the "White Group"", in the book In his image, in his words: perusing the art and poetry of Azriel Kaufman (editors: Aïm Deüelle Lüski, Mazal Kaufman), Carmel Publishing.
- 2021 To Know Painting, collection of essays, Resling Publishing.
- 2021, Amon Yariv (editor) Gordon Gallery, Israeli Contemporary Art, 429 pages; Hirschfeld wrote articles about Ron Arad, Sasha Serber, Gilad Efrat, Haim Kieve, Batia Grossbard, Michal Na'aman, Philip Rantzer, Michael Druks, Dani Karavan, Ohad Meromi, Alima, Menashe Kadishman, Maya Cohen Levy, Ya'acov Dorchin, Tal Yerushalmi, Jan Rauchwerger, Amir Shefet, Jossef Krispel, Erez Aharon, Map representations in contemporary Israeli art, Asad Azi, Ofer Lellouche, Shosh Kormosh, Ohad Meromi, The Sculpture Garden, Dan Orimian, Michael Kovner, Adam Cohn, the 1970s in Israeli art, Asaf Ben Zvi, David Ginton and Pnina Reichman.
- 2022 essay in the book Hanina A Place for Contemporary Art: The First Ten Years 2009–2018 (Yakir Segev, editor). Hanina Gallery.
- 2022 Had Gadya: The Horror Cycle, group exhibition, Artists' House, Jerusalem.
- 2025 Essay in the exhibition catalogue Linda Adams: Interiors, Maya Gallery, Tel Aviv.
- 2025 Jonathan Ullman, The Space Art. Text: Jonathan Hirschfeld.
- 2025 The essay "Painting Contemplates Itself as a Dream", in the book Dream now: selected essays about the dream, Bookworm publishing, Itamar Levi (editor).
- 2026, Amon Yariv (editor) Gordon Gallery, Israeli Contemporary Art, 433 pages; Hirschfeld wrote articles about Ron Arad, Sasha Serber, Moshe Kupferman, Michal Na'aman, Philip Rantzer, Gilad Efrat, Michael Druks, Dani Karavan, Alima, Menashe Kadishman, Maya Cohen Levy, Elie Shamir, Jan Rauchwerger, Amir Shefet and Erez Aharon, Asad Azi, Ofer Lellouche, Uri Lifschitz, Shosh Kormosh, The Sculpture Garden, Igael Tumarkin, Samah Shihadi, the 1970s in Israeli art, Asaf Ben Zvi, Michel Platnic, David Ginton and Ido Bar-El.
