= Eden Auerbach Ofrat =

Israeli video-art and video installation artist

Mrs Eden Auerbach Ofrat עדן אורבך עפרת
- Born: Jerusalem
- Education: Master's Degree
- Known for: Video art installation
- Website: www.edenofrat.com

Eden Auerbach Ofrat (Hebrew: עדן אורבך עפרת; born 1979) is an Israeli video-art and video installation artist. In her work, Auerbach Ofrat deals with cultural archetypes, canonical or imaginary symbols, contradictory and complementary existential poles, relying on literary and mythical sources. Her work is done either through playing with given mythological elements and symbols or by creating “private” myths. Eden has won an Sharett scholarship from the America-Israel Foundation and the “Young Artist Award” by the Israeli Ministry of Culture, Education, and Sports.

== Biography ==
Eden Auerbach Ofrat was born in Jerusalem in 1979, daughter of art historian Gideon Ofrat and photographer Aliza Auerbach. During her childhood years, Eden studied at the Jerusalem Open Experimental School “Hanisuii”. From 1999 to 2000, Eden studied at Tel Aviv University's Department of Film and Television. Between 2000 and 2004, Eden studied in the Art Department at Bezalel School of the arts, Jerusalem, after which, in 2008, she spent one year studying at Goldsmiths College at the University of London. From 2010 to 2012, Eden studied in the master's program at Bezalel. Since her undergraduate studies, Eden has exhibited her work in many museum exhibitions (The Israel Museum, The Museum on the Seam, The Tel Aviv Museum, The Petah Tikvah Museum of Art, etc.) and group exhibitions in many galleries and festivals in Israel and abroad. From 2005 to 2009, Eden was one associated with Noga Gallery in Tel - Aviv. Eden's video and installation works are in the collection of the Israel Museum and private collections in Israel and abroad.

== Awards ==
- 2004 – America-Israel Foundation scholarship
- 2014 – Ministry of Culture, Education and Sports Young Artist Award
