= Aliza Auerbach =

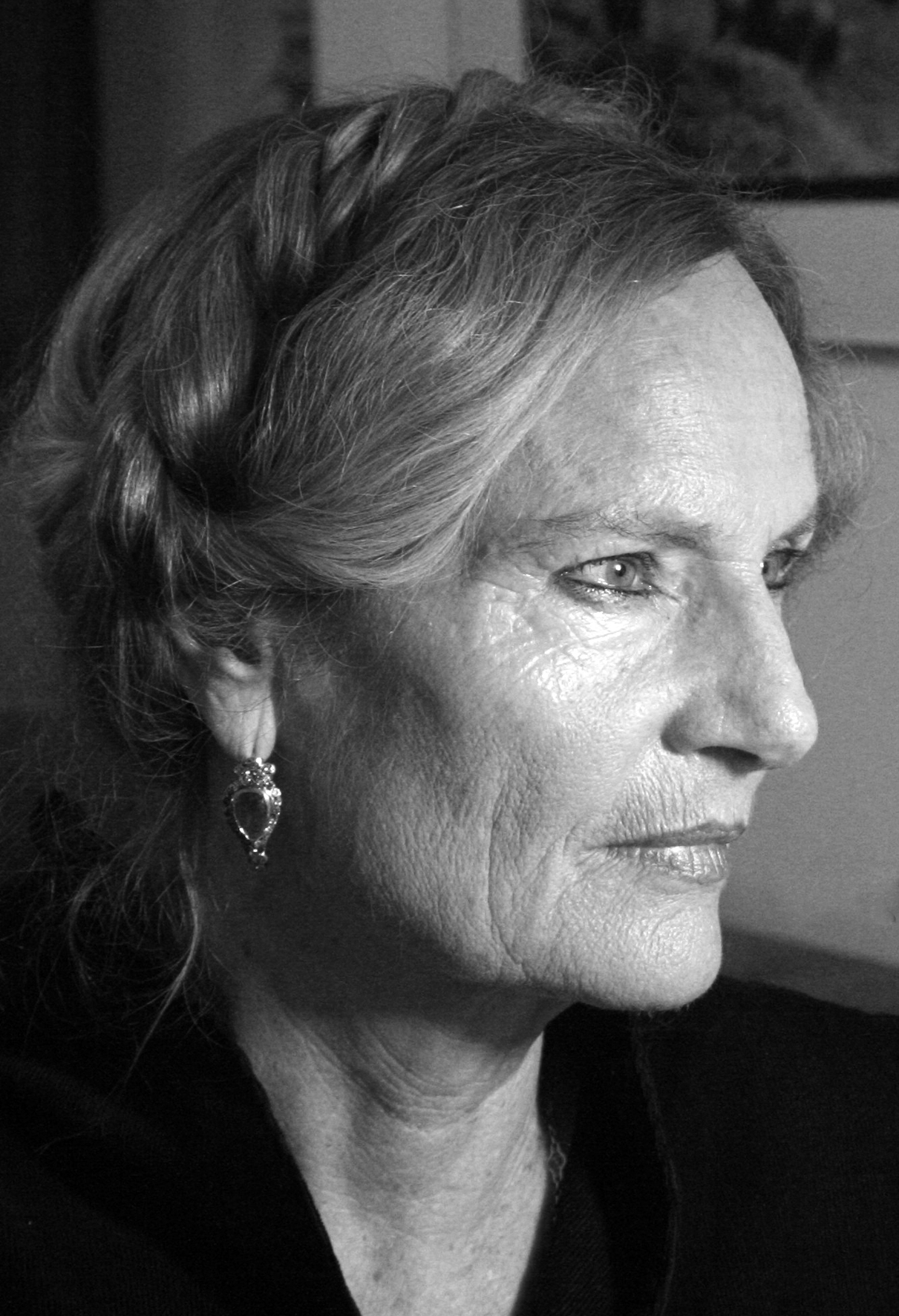
- Self-portrait of Aliza Auerbach, 2007
- Born: August 17, 1940; Haifa, Mandatory Palestine
- Died: March 29, 2016 (aged 75); Jerusalem, Israel
- Known for: Photography
- Spouse: Gideon Ofrat
- Children: Eden Auerbach Ofrat
- Website: alizaauerbach.com

Aliza Auerbach (Hebrew: עליזה אורבך; 17 August 1940 – 29 March 2016) was an Israeli photographer, best known for her portrait photography and humanistic documentary work.

== Biography ==
Aliza Auerbach was born in Haifa in 1940. She completed her bachelor's degree in philosophy and Biblical studies at the Hebrew University of Jerusalem. Following her graduation, she taught for several years at the Rehavia Gymnasium in Jerusalem.

In 1972, she began working professionally as a photographer. In 1974, she presented her first solo exhibition, titled Israeli Youth, which traveled internationally under the auspices of the Israeli Ministry of Foreign Affairs. Between 1972 and 1989, she worked as a photojournalist for Israeli and international news outlets, including Haaretz, The Jerusalem Post, The New York Times, The Times, and Die Zeit.

Auerbach's work focused primarily on portraiture and humanistic documentary photography. Major themes in her work included documenting Israeli pioneers, Jewish immigrants from the Soviet Union and Ethiopia, and Holocaust survivors, as well as focusing on mothers, working women, and the city of Jerusalem. In 1988, her photographs accompanied a selection of Jerusalem poems by the poet Yehuda Amichai.

In 1995, she was awarded the American Express Award in the UNESCO International Photo Contest. She also served as a curator for the photography gallery at Beit Gabriel on the shores of the Sea of Galilee.

Auerbach was married to art critic and curator Gideon Ofrat. Their daughter, Eden Auerbach Ofrat, is a video artist. She lived and worked in the Abu Tor neighborhood of Jerusalem.

Her work is included in the collections of major institutions, including the Israel Museum, the Tel Aviv Museum of Art, Mishkan Museum of Art, Ein Harod, the Open Museum of Photography, the Ramat Gan Museum of Israeli Art, Museum on the Seam, as well as various private collections. Her photographic style is characterized by emphasizing humanistic perspectives, printing the full frame without cropping, black-and-white prints, and visible film grain.

In 2018, her personal archive was donated to the National Library of Israel.

== Selected solo exhibitions ==
- Pioneers, Mishkan Museum of Art, Ein Harod (1990)
- Immigrants, Mishkan Museum of Art, Ein Harod (1992)
- Aliyah from the USSR and Ethiopia, The Knesset, Jerusalem (1993)
- A Life in Photography, The Open Museum of Photography, Tel Hai (1996)
- Lena, Ramat Gan Museum of Israeli Art (2003)
- Elegia, Ben-Gurion University of the Negev Gallery (2003–2004)
- Readers, National Library of Israel, (Curator: Ruth Calderon, 2013)
- Life, Mishkan Museum of Art, Ein Harod (Curator: Guy Raz, 2016)
- I Stood in Jerusalem: Aliza Auerbach, Beit Avi Chai Gallery (Curator: Amichai Chasson, 2026)

== Selected publications ==
- Pioneers (1990), Ministry of Defense Publishing
- Immigrants (1992), Ministry of Defense Publishing
- Mothers (1997), Steimatzky
- Women at Work (2003), Keter Publishing
- Song of the Sea (2007), Hakibbutz Hameuchad
- Survivors (2009), Yad Yitzhak Ben-Zvi
- Readers (2013), National Library of Israel
