= Bill Meyer (artist) =

Australian painter (born 1942)

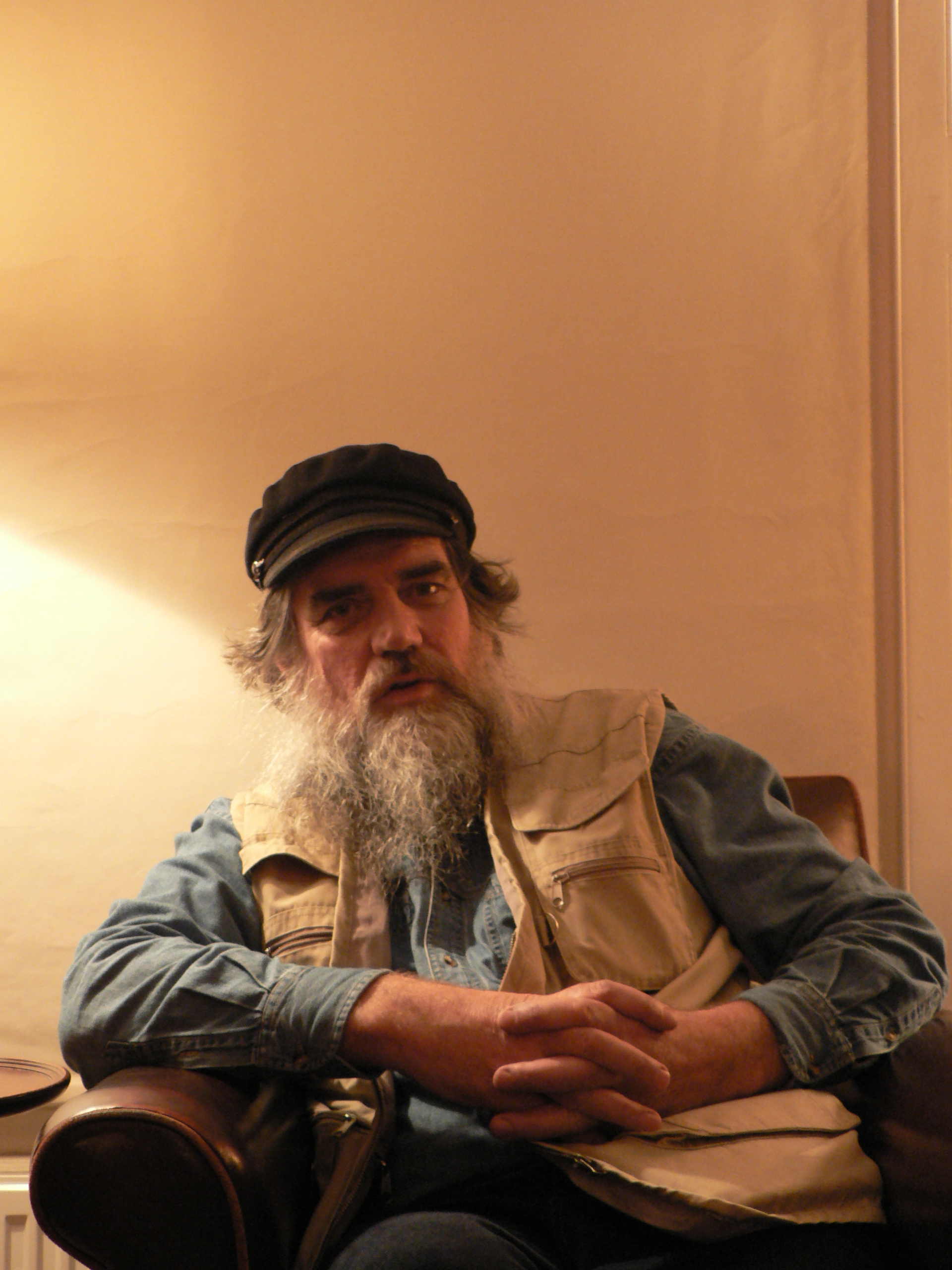
- Taken in London 2007
- Born: 10 December 1942 (age 83)

Bill (Chaim) Meyer (10 December 1942) is an Australian painter. Born in Australia, Bill Meyer graduated from Melbourne University in art history and languages and then from the National Gallery Art School (later Victorian College of the Arts), completing his formal art training at the Royal College of Art in London (1972). Research at the Yidisher Visnshaftlekher Institut (YIVO) New York, as well as Yeshiva and Kollel learning, has provided much of the conceptual underpinning of Meyer's artwork, and he was a visiting resident artist during the '80s and '90s at the Mishkenot Sha'ananim artists' studios in Jerusalem.

== Work ==
Meyer established a fine art editioning studio in London during the 1970s at 10 Martello Street, Hackney. By 1973 he was collaborating with Avital Geva, Moshe Gershuni, Matthew Greenberg and Michael Druks exhibiting at the Romi Goldmuntz Centre, Antwerp. He printed for many artists including Ian McKeever and Genesis P'Orridge with Cosey Fanni Tutti making posters for the infamous Prostitution show at the Institute of Contemporary Arts in London in 1976, as well as conceiving and creating photo-events with Genesis and Cosey as performers and models. He has since continued to use photography, film and music in his work. He has worked with a large number of Australian artists at Port Jackson Press publishing in Melbourne. During the eighties, while he was a committee member, and later when he was president of the Print Council of Australia, Meyer curated travelling exhibitions including the controversial Print as Object. He also created Gapscape, an exhibition of his prints and drawings which toured twenty-four regional Australian galleries. In 1995 he participated in The Wandering Jew. Myth and Metaphor, curated and toured for the Jewish Museum of Australia, an organisation with which he has collaborated in numerous other curated and solo projects. Recent work includes the 105 metre charcoal on paper installation, A Special Place - HaMakom, and experiments with Lamda photographic digital prints.

== Selected exhibitions and publications ==
- 1962; Bill Meyer, New East-side Gallery, Melbourne
- 1969; Matzoh Stomp, Gallery Lanae, Melbourne and Balwyn Cinema International
- 1972; Cancellations, Screen Prints Photographs & Xeroxes by Bill Meyer, Institute of Contemporary Arts, London
- 1973; Eating Mussels in the Bath, Paper Point Gallery (Wiggins Teape), London and Bonython Galleries, Sydney
- 1973; Jaynie Anderson, Bill Meyer: Screenprints Documentations Photography, University of Exeter, 1973
- 1974; Mezzanine Xpos, Galerij Romi Goldmuntz Centrum, Antwerp
- 1975; New York Subway Graffiti & the American Landscape, Painting Box Press, Zurich
- 1976; 'Underwater/Underground, Bill Meyer and Mati Grunberg', Institute of Contemporary Arts Bulletin
- 1977; Sinai Paintings and Drawings, Galerij Luka te Boechout.
- 1982; Geelong Survey Exhibition, 4, Pam Ashcroft, Noel Essex, Bill Meyer, Brian Poynton, Geelong Art Gallery, 1982
- 1982; Seven artists : Jonas Balsaitis, Charles Green, Paul Laspagis, Joseph McDermott-Mallin, Bill Meyer, Andrew Reeve, David Ryan, Victorian College of the Arts Gallery, Melbourne, 1982
- 1982; GAPSCAPE, introduction by Doug Hall and David Rankin, ISBN 0-9593138-0-X
- 1984; Inside the Gap, Installations lectures, and workshops, Wagga City Art Gallery
- 1985; Print as Object, Print Council of Australia, ISBN 0-909227-08-X
- 1989; New Paintings - A Reason for Being, Gretz Gallery, Melbourne
- 1999; Chaim (Bill) Meyer, The Jerusalem Drawings
- 1999; Eva Eden, 'Bill Meyer, Survey Exhibitions'. Imprint The Print Council of Australia Journal, vol. 34, pp. 6–7.
- 1999; Untitled Booth and Survey, Convent Gallery, Daylesford.
- 2006; Chaim (Bill) Meyer, A project of Kollel Beis Ha Talmud-Yehuda. A Special Place – HaMakom. (Jewish Art and Symbolism, a decade of Meyer's Drawings & installations), edited by Yisroel Greenwald, Fishman Institute, Melbourne, ISBN 1-875670-38-6,
- 2014: Bill Meyer: Nurturing the Place, Castlemaine Art Museum, 02 Nov–14 Dec
