= Itamar Freed =

Israeli artist

Itamar Freed איתמר פריד
- Born: 1987 (age 38–39); Manhattan
- Education: Bezalel Academy of Arts and Design, Royal College of Arts
- Known for: Photography
- Awards: Epson first prize for excellence in the art of photography

Itamar Freed (Hebrew: איתמר פריד) is an Israeli artist.

== Biography ==
Itamar Freed was born in 1987 in Manhattan. Itamar Freed graduated with BFA from the Bezalel Academy of Arts and Design in 2012. He is studying for MFA in Photography at the Royal College of Arts in London. Freed is dividing his time between Israel and London.

== Exhibitions ==
=== Solo ===
- 2014. Birds of Paradise. Feinberg Projects. Tel Aviv.
- 2015. No time, Ramat Gan Museum of Israeli Art. Curated by Ayelet Hashahar Cohen.

=== Group ===
- 2016. Musrara Mix, Musrara gallery, Naggar School of Photography, Jerusalem
- 2017. A Private Moment in Public, Haifa Museum of Art. Curated by Limor Alpern Zered.

== Awards ==
- 2012. Epson first prize for excellence in the art of photography. Israel
