= Rudi Lehmann =

German-born Israeli artist (1903–1977)

Rudi Lehmann רודי להמן
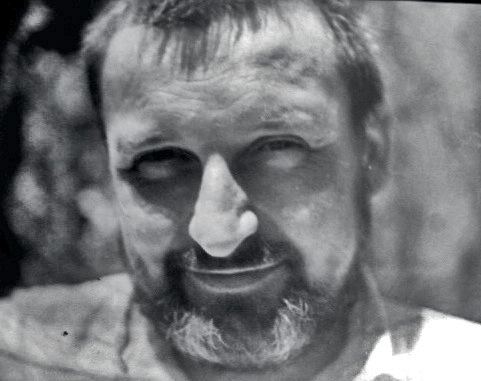
- Born: Rudolf Lehmann; August 25, 1903; Berlin, German Empire
- Died: 1977; Givatayim, Israel
- Education: Kunsthochschule Berlin-Weißensee
- Known for: Sculptor and wood carving artist

Rudolf (Rudi) Lehmann (Hebrew: רודי להמן; 1903–1977) was a German-born Israeli sculptor and wood carving artist. He was one of the pioneers of sculpture in the State of Israel.

== Biography ==
Rudolf (Rudi) Lehmann (1903-1977), born in Berlin, August 25, 1903 to non-Jewish German Elizabeth Sender. In 1919 Rudolf was adopted by the Lehmann family. He was one of the pioneers of wood sculpting in the State of Israel.

== Studies ==
In 1912 in Berlin, he practiced wood sculpture with Ludwig Vordermayer.

From 1917 to 1922, he studied mechanics and worked as a blacksmith's apprentice. After studying woodcarving and sculpture with sculptor Harold Isenstein, he attended the de:Kunsthochschule Berlin-Weißensee (Municipal Art School Berlin-Weißensee), majoring in sculpture and ceramics. During his studies there, he met Hedwig Grossman, whom he later married. In 1928-1930, Lehmann worked for Holzmann's Stone Mason and Carving company. He became a freelance stonemason and sculptor for museums around Germany, including the Pergamon Museum in Berlin, and worked in terra cotta at Hedwig's ceramics workshop. In the summer of 1933, Lehmann immigrated to Mandate Palestine with his wife and settled in Haifa. They established a ceramics testing laboratory at the Technion in Haifa and settled on Kibbutz Yagur in 1935, where they established a flower pot factory.

In 1937, the couple opened a sculpture studio in Jerusalem, where Lehmann produced miniature carvings from olive wood, ivory, horn and gemstones sold as tourist souvenirs. From 1945 to 1947, Lehmann worked for the Haganah, building models and ballistic implements. In 1947-1948, he joined the Jewish Agency's Self-Defense Planning Committee.

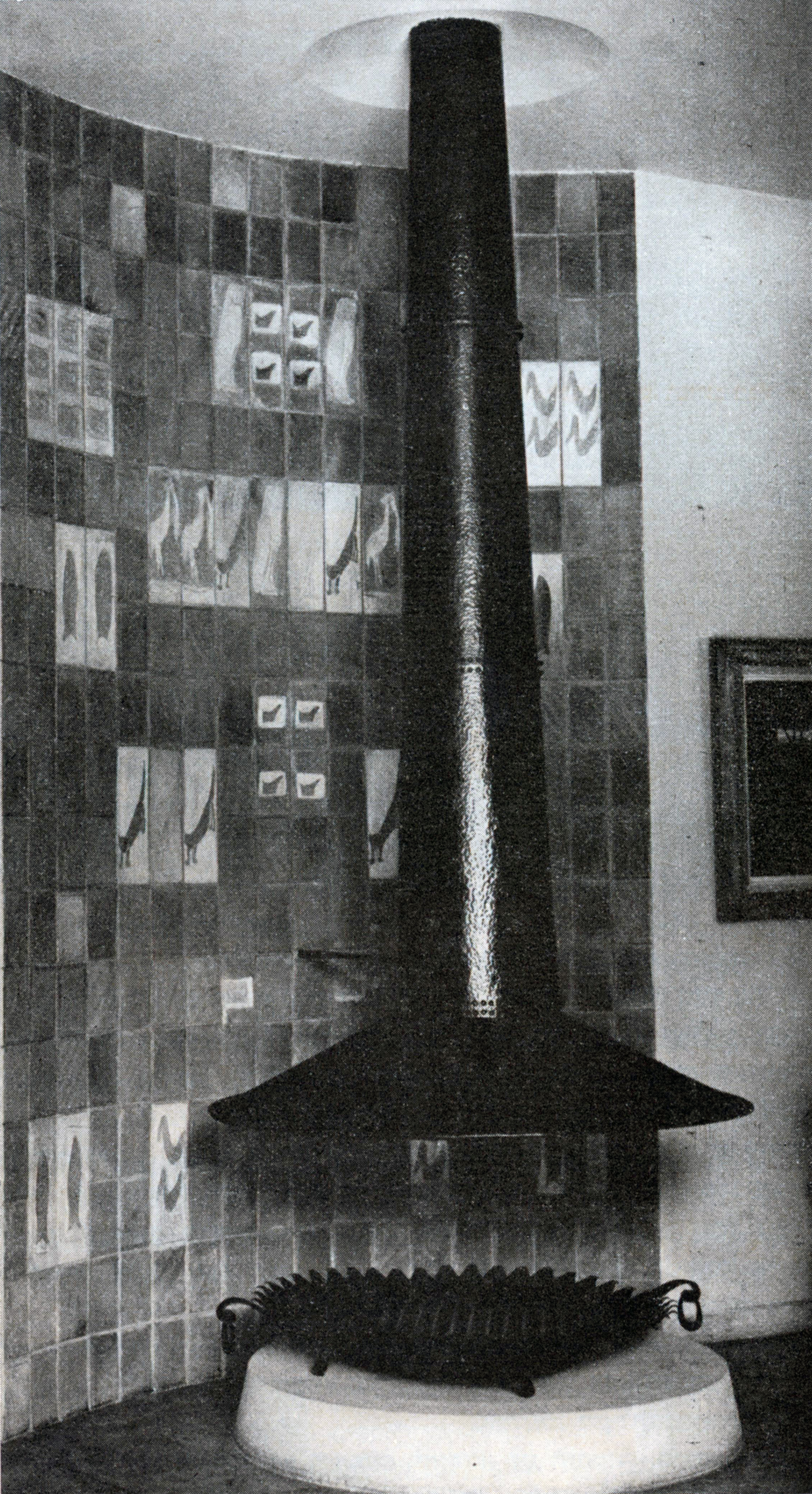
Mural by Rudi Lehmann

In 1953, he helped to found the Ein Hod Artists' Village, where he taught sculpture. Among his students were Yigael Tumarkin and Menashe Kadishman. In 1959, Lehmann and his wife moved to Givatayim where he established an art school under the auspices of the Givatayim municipality. The school held classes in sculpture, woodcuts and ceramics for young people and adults.

Lehmann's work was influenced by the Canaanism school of Israeli art. which attempted to create a direct relationship with the Land of Israel by emphasizing simple shapes and motifs from the sculpture and ritual art of early Middle Eastern civilizations.

He died in 1977.

== Awards and recognition ==
- 1933 Dizengoff Prize for Painting and Sculpture, Municipality of Tel Aviv-Yafo
- 1951 Dizengoff Prize for Painting and Sculpture, Tel Aviv Museum of Art, Municipality of Tel Aviv-Yafo
- 1953 Dizengoff Prize for Painting and Sculpture, Municipality of Tel Aviv-Yafo
- 1966 Dizengoff Prize for Painting and Sculpture, Municipality of Tel Aviv-Yafo

== Education ==
- 1912 Academy of Berlin, Germany, wood sculpture with Vordermeyer
- 1917 Berlin, Germany, blacksmithing and metalworking
- 1922-24 woodcarving and sculpture with sculptor Harold Isenstein
- 1923 Municipal High School for Art, Berlin, Germany, sculpture and ceramics
- 1924-28 Modern Art School, Berlin, Germany, sculpture and ceramics

== Teaching ==
- 1923-25 Art School, Berlin Municipality, Germany
- 1934 Bezalel Academy of Arts and Design, Jerusalem
- 1959 Studio in Givatayim, sculpture and ceramics

== See also ==
- Visual arts in Israel
