= Givon Gallery =

Contemporary art gallery in Tel Aviv

Coordinates: 32.0821°N 34.7733°E

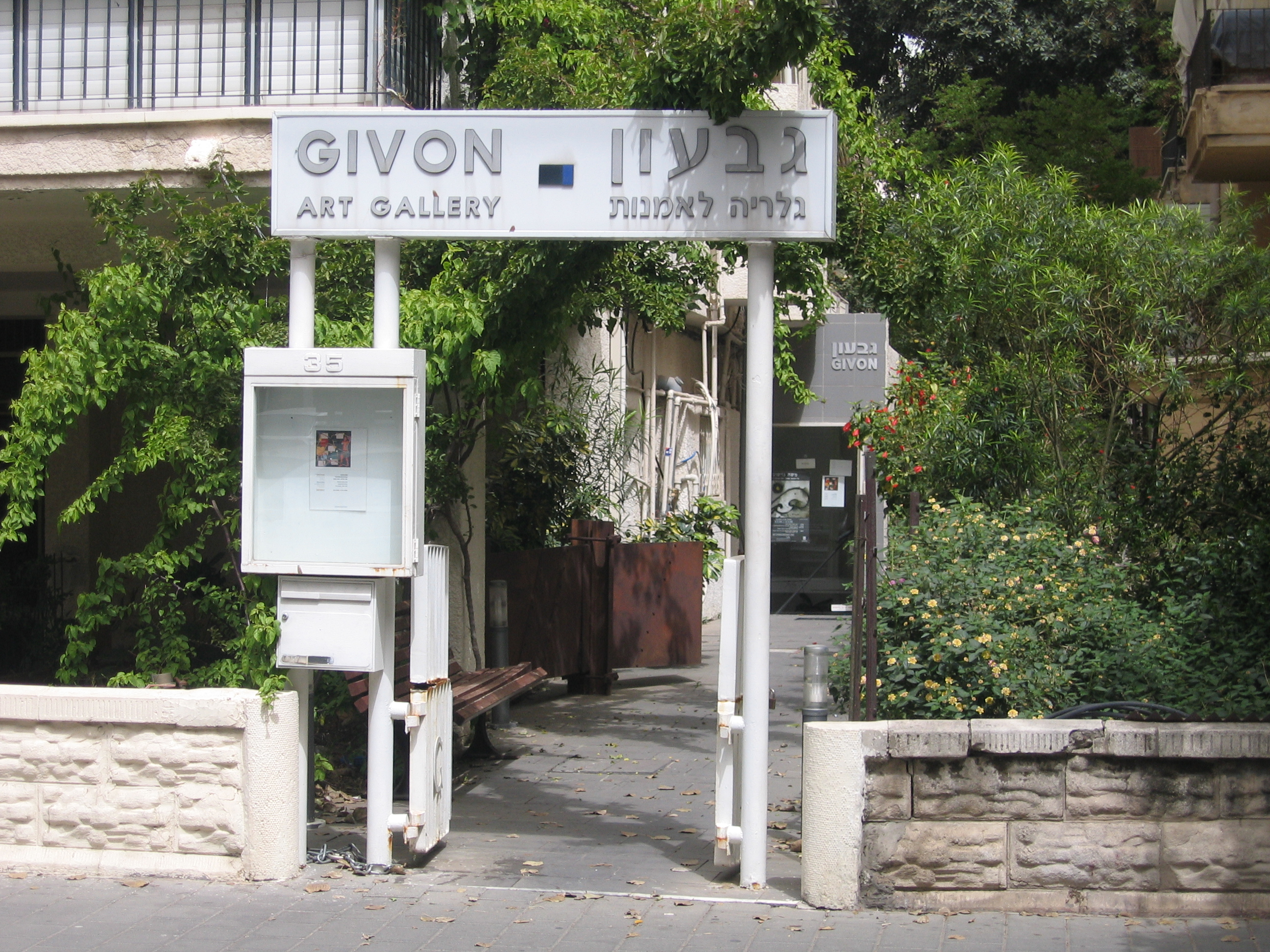
Givon Art Gallery

The Givon Art Gallery (Hebrew: גלריה גבעון) is a contemporary art gallery in Tel Aviv, Israel.

The Gallery was founded in 1974 by Sam Givon on Gordon Street in Tel Aviv. In 1979 his daughter, Naomi (Noemi) opened the Givon Contemporary Art Gallery. Since the founder's death in 2000, the Gallery has been managed by Naomi Givon and is co-owned with her sister, Nurit Wolf, an attorney.

The proprietor is Naomi Givon. In 2012 Givon completed the architecturally notable renovation of an abandoned 1890 house in Tel Aviv's Neve Tzedek neighborhood.

Artists represented by Givon include Pinchas Cohen Gan, Micha Ullman, Moshe Gershuni, Raffi Lavie, Jonathan Hirschfeld.

== Givon Art Prize ==
The Shmuel Givon Prize is awarded annually in the founder's memory by the Tel Aviv Museum of Art.

=== Recipients ===
- 2001 Guy Ben-Ner
- 2002 Karen Russo
- 2003 Adam Rabinowitz, Shai Zurim
- 2004 Talia Keinan
- 2005 Gilad Ratman, Gil Marco Shani
- 2006 Bat Sheva Ross
- 2007 Lior Shvil
- 2008 Orly Sever, Nir Evron
- 2009 Yoav Efrati
- 2010 Tamar Harpaz, Yael Efrati
- 2011 Hila Toony Navok, Efrat Kedem
- 2012 Nevet Yitzhak, Ester Schneider

== See also ==
- Art in Tel Aviv
