= Hedwig Grossman Lehmann =

German-born Israeli artist (1902–1998)

Hedwig Grossman Lehmann הדוויג גרוסמן להמן
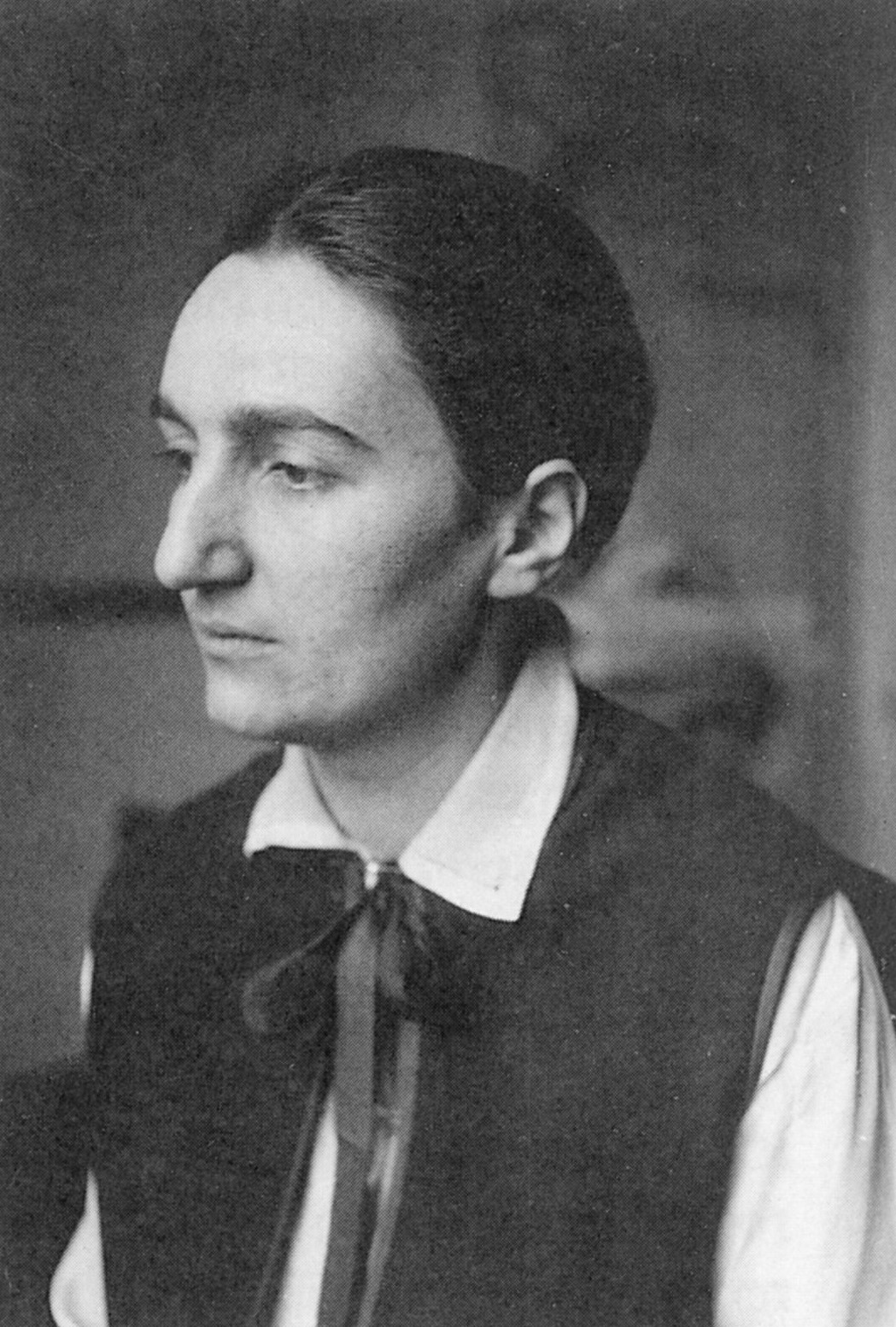
- Born: 1902; Berlin
- Died: 1998 (aged 95–96)
- Known for: Pottery, sculpting, woodcarving and ceramicist
- Movement: Israeli art

Hedwig Grossman Lehmann (Hebrew: הדוויג גרוסמן להמן; 1902–1998) was a German-born Israeli artist.

== Biography ==
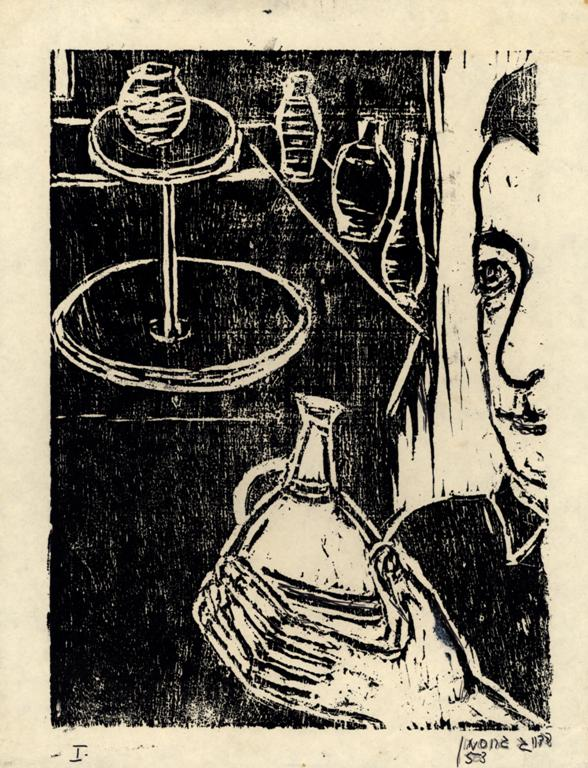
H.G. with a Bottle in her Hand and Potter's wheel, 1953

Hedwig Grossman was born in Germany in 1902. Her father was Polish and her mother, Hispanic. Hedwig's family grew up as assimilated and anti-Zionistic Jews. During her childhood, Hedwig joined Wandervogel, a German youth movement. She left this group to later join the Zionistic Jewish youth movement "Blue and White"he:בלאו וייס.

Grossman showed an early talent for art and attended art classes in her school where they taught pottery. Grossman's success was written up in the local newspaper where she was noted as being the first woman in this field. Later Grossman moved to a small potter's village in Lower Silesia and further developed her pottery skills. After that she moved to Bolesławiec where she studied the Chemistry of Pottery and experimented with clay from Israel, as she was interested in moving to Israel. Grossman moved to Berlin in 1930 and opened a pottery workshop. She participated in exhibitions and was accepted into the "Creative Women Union".

In the years 1930–1933 she began working with Rudi Lehmann, whom she later married. In the autumn of 1932 she immigrated to the Land of Israel with her husband, settling in Haifa. Grossman was one of the first Israeli artists to use local clays and derived inspiration from Arab pottery. Grossman's ceramic works made use of local Israeli materials and natural colors and shows influences from archaeological artifacts. In the early 1950s, she began to produce woodcuts. In 1935, Grossman established a flower pot factory and ceramic workshop at Kibbutz Yagur. In 1937, the couple moved to Jerusalem. In 1953, she was one of the founders of the Artists' Colony Ein Hod, where she lived until 1957. In 1959, the couple moved to Givatayim, where they established a municipal art school.

Hedwig Grossman Lehmann died in 1998.

== Awards and recognition ==
- Silver Medal, The Triennale of Applied Arts, Milan
- 1955 second place in Ceramics industry, Haifa Museum of Art, Haifa
- 1973 Ben-Yitzhak Prize for Children's Books Illustration, Israel Museum, Jerusalem. Grossman's book "Terra Cotta" won a special mention.

== Education ==
- Hebrow, Hochschule für die Wissenschaft des Judentums, Berlin, Germany
- 1923-1920 Pestalozzi Freiwillhaus, Berlin, Germany
- Deutsche Hochschule für Politik, Berlin, Germany
- Sculpture, ceramics, graphic art, School of Art and Design Berlin, Berlin, Germany
- Ceramic engineering and laboratory, Technion, Berlin, Germany
- Professional School of Ceramics, Bolesławiec, Germany 1927–1928
- 1928–1929 School of Art and Design, Halle, Germany

== Teaching ==
- 1919–1923 Counselor at an orphanage for Polish war orphans and Jüdisches Volksheim youth
- Center in Berlin 1930–1933 Teacher, private studio, Berlin 1937–1957 Teacher, private studio, *Jerusalem 1956–1959 Teacher, private studio, Ein Hod 1964-1980s Art Institute of Givatayim.
