= Raw Art Gallery =

Art gallery in Israel

Raw Art Gallery is a contemporary art gallery in Tel Aviv, Israel.

The Raw Art Gallery was founded in 2007 by Shimon Ben Shabbat and Eldan Barnoon. The gallery represents Israeli and international artists who work in the fields of painting, photography, sculpting and video with a goal of promoting young contemporary art and to represent Israeli artists around the world.

== See also ==
- Visual arts in Israel
