= Igael Tumarkin =

Israeli painter and sculptor (1933–2021)

Igael Tumarkin יגאל תומרקין
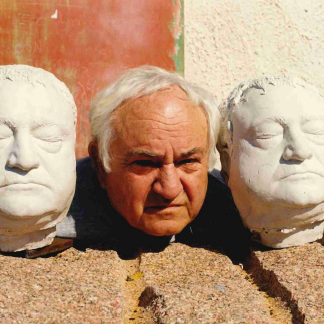
- Igael Tumarkin (1999)
- Born: Peter Martin Gregor Heinrich Hellberg; 23 October 1933; Dresden, Saxony, Germany
- Died: 12 August 2021 (aged 87)
- Education: Studied with Rudi Lehmann, Ein Hod
- Known for: Sculpture
- Spouses: Naomi; Naamah
- Children: 3
- Awards: 1985 Dizengoff Prize; 2004 Israel Prize

Igael Tumarkin (Hebrew: יגאל תומרקין; 23 October 1933 – 12 August 2021) was an Israeli painter and sculptor.

== Biography ==
Peter Martin Gregor Heinrich Hellberg (later Igael Tumarkin) was born in 1933 in Dresden, Saxony, Germany. His father, Martin Hellberg, was a German theater actor and director, and a son of a pastor. His Jewish mother, Berta Gurevitch, and his stepfather, Herzl Tumarkin, immigrated to then British Mandate of Palestine (now Israel) when he was two.

Tumarkin served in the Israeli Navy. After completing his military service, he studied sculpture in Ein Hod, a village of artists near Mount Carmel, under Rudi Lehmann. His youngest son is the actor Yon Tumarkin. Tumarkin died at the age of 87 on 12 August 2021.

His estate and the copyright to all his works are managed today by his sole heirs – his three children: Orna, Dor, and Yon Tumarkin.

== Art career ==
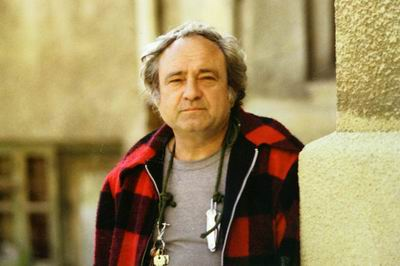
Igael Tumarkin, 1980

Among Tumarkin's best known works are the Holocaust and Revival memorial in Rabin Square, Tel Aviv and his sculptures commemorate fallen soldiers in the Negev.

Tumarkin was also an art theoretician and stage designer. In the 1950s, Tumarkin worked in East Berlin, Amsterdam, and Paris. Upon his return to Israel in 1961, he became a driving force behind the break from the charismatic monopoly of lyric abstraction there. Tumarkin created assemblages of found objects, generally with violent expressionist undertones and decidedly unlyrical color. His determination to "be different" influenced his younger Israeli colleagues. The furor generated around Tumarkin's works, such as the old pair of trousers stuck to one of his pictures, intensified the mystique surrounding him. One of his controversial works is a pig wearing phylacteries (or tefillin, small boxes containing scriptures).

== Education ==
- 1954 – Studied with Rudi Lehmann, Ein-Hod
- 1955 Studied with Bertolt Brecht, Berliner Ensemble, Berlin
- 1955-57 Assistant to the designer Karl von Appen

== Awards and recognition ==
- 1963 First Prize for Battle of Hulaykat Monument
- 1968 The Sandberg Prize for Israeli Art, Israel Museum, Jerusalem, Israel
- 1968 First Prize for Memorial to Sailors, Haifa
- 1971 First Prize for Memorial for "Holocaust and Revival", Tel Aviv
- 1978 First Prize in the Biennale for Drawing, Reike
- 1984 Award from the president of the Italian Republic
- 1985 Dizengoff Prize for Sculpture
- 1990 Guest of the Japan Foundation
- 1992 August Rodin Prize, The International Sculpture Competition of the Open Museum, Hakone, Japan, for his sculpture of the sign at the entrance to Auschwitz concentration camp Arbeit Macht Frei.
- 1997 Award of Excellence, the president of the Federal Republic of Germany
- 1998 Sussman Prize, Vienna
- 2004 Israel Prize for sculpture

== Outdoor and public art ==
Tumarkin created over 80 outdoor sculptures in Israel and around the world.

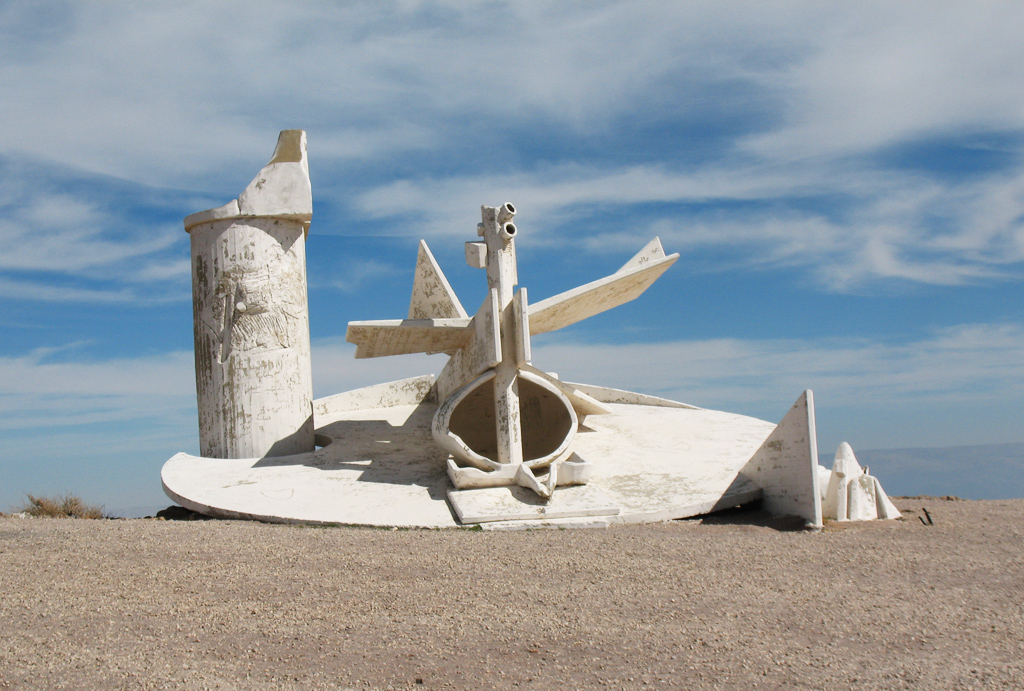
Monument in the Moav Outlook in Arad, Israel

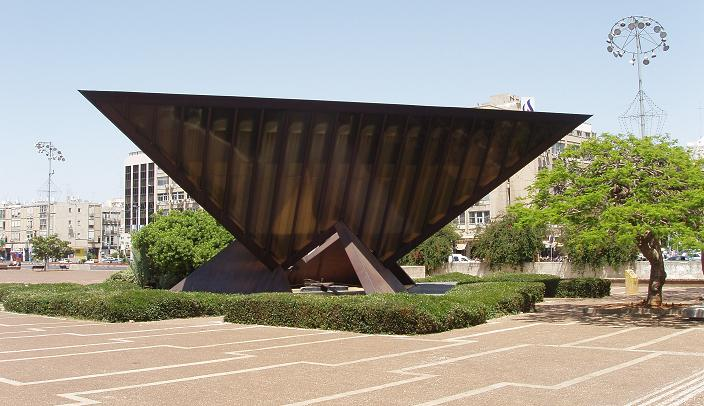
Holocaust memorial sculpture in Tel Aviv

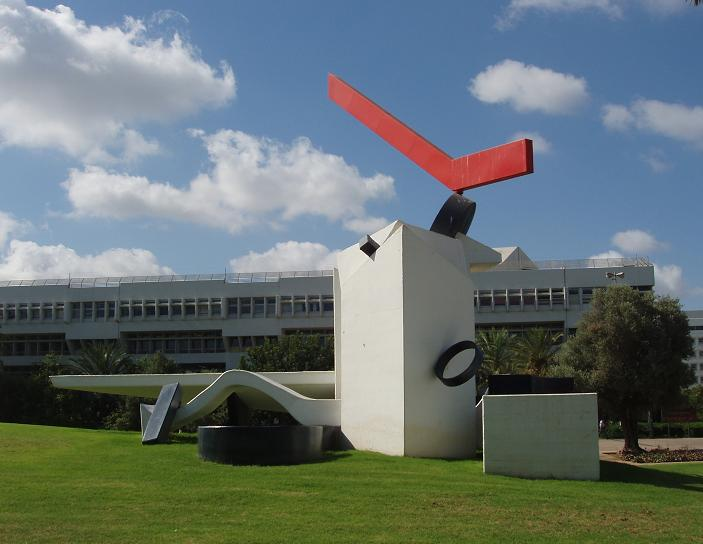
Happenings in Tel-Aviv University

- 1962-68 "Panorama", concrete and steel, Arad, Israel
- 1962-69 "Age of Science", concrete and steel, Dimona
- 1963 "Vibrations A & B", concrete, Kiryat Yam and "Window to the Sea", concrete, Atlit
- 1964-65 "Monument for the Holocaust", concrete and steel, Nazareth
- 1966 "Peace Memorial", Hebron Road, Jerusalem
- 1967 “He Walked in the Fields”
- 1968 Arad Observatory sculpture
- 1968 Big Chief, tank assemblage painted, Kiryat Shmona
- 1969-71 "War and Peace", steel and stone, Ramat Gan
- 1970 "Keystone Gate", painted steel, Jerusalem
- 1970 "Homage to Dürer, painted steel, Haifa
- 1971 "Homage to Jerusalem", Givat Shapira
- 1971 Sculpture Garden, 61 Weizmann Street, Holon
- 1971-75 "Monument to the Holocaust and Revival", corten and glass, Tel Aviv
- 1972 "Happenings and Homage to Kepler", concrete and painted steel, Tel Aviv University, Tel Aviv; "Sundial Garden", concrete, Ashkelon; and "Monument to the Fallen", concrete painted white and steel, Jordan Valley
- 1972-73 "Airport Monument", painted steel, Lod
- 1973 "Challenge to the Sun", Ramot Alon, Jerusalem
- 1986 "Chichen Itzma", Kiryat Menahem, Jerusalem
- 1986 Pisgat Zeev, Jerusalem
- 1989 Homage to Robert Capa, Pozoblanco, Spain
- 1989 La Liberte, Bordeaux, France
- 1991 Bertolt Brecht, Berlin Museum Garden
- 1992 "Jerusalem – Three Faiths", Mount Scopus, Jerusalem
- 1993 Semaphore, Weizmann Institute of Science, Rehovot
- 1993 My Seven Pillars of Wisdom, Hakone Open Air Museum, Japan
- 1994–96 The Sculpture Garden of Belvoir (Kochav HaYarden)
- 1997 Memorial for Yitzhak Rabin, Ramat Gan Museum
- 2000 Abu Nabut Garden, Jaffa

== See also ==
- List of Israel Prize recipients
- Visual arts in Israel
