= Gil Marco Shani =

Israeli artist (born 1968)

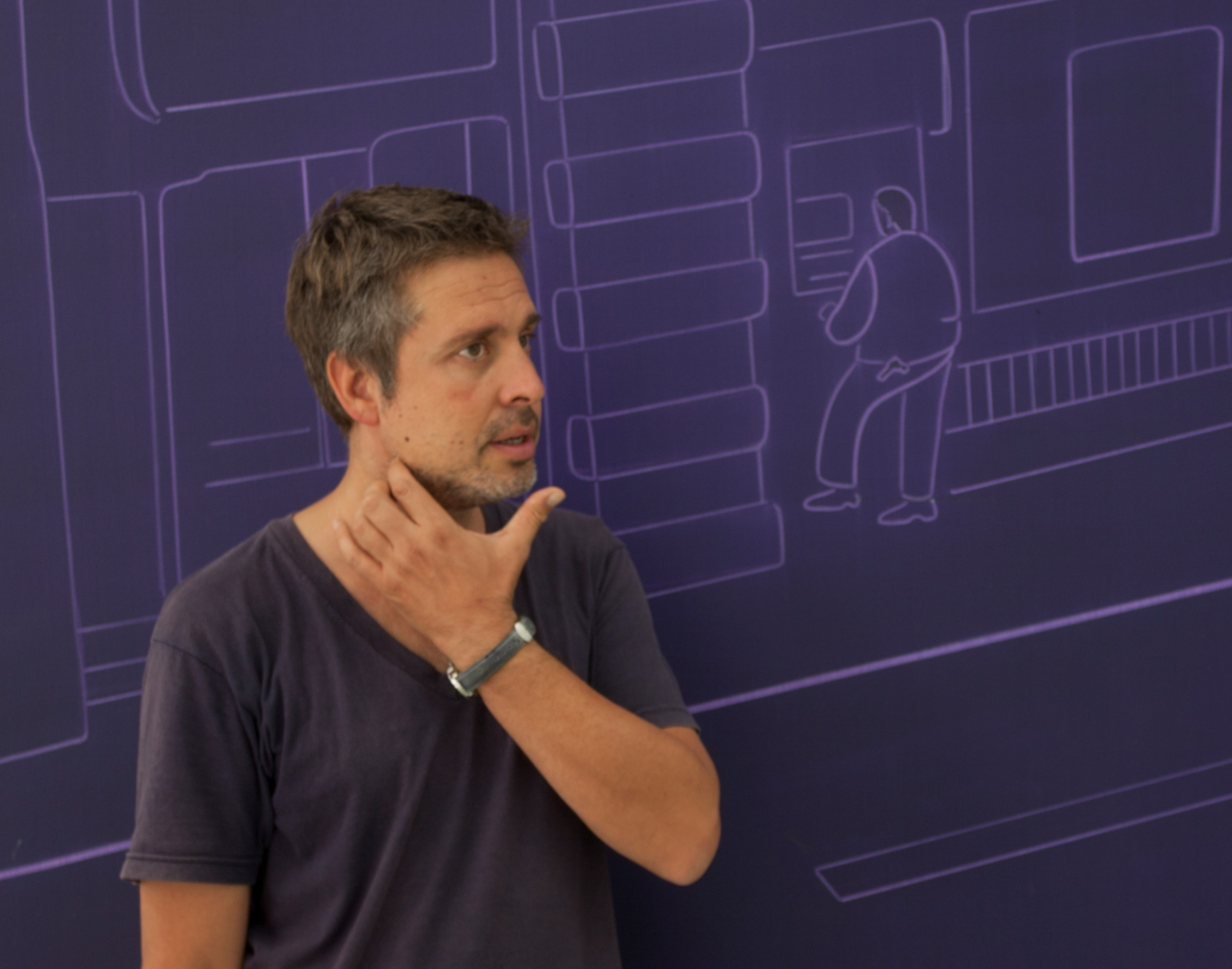
- Gil Marco Shani, 2020
- Born: גיל מרקו שני; 1968 (age 57–58); Tel Aviv, Israel
- Education: Bezalel Academy of Arts and Design
- Awards: The Sandberg Prize for Israeli Art
- Website: www.gilmarcoshani.com

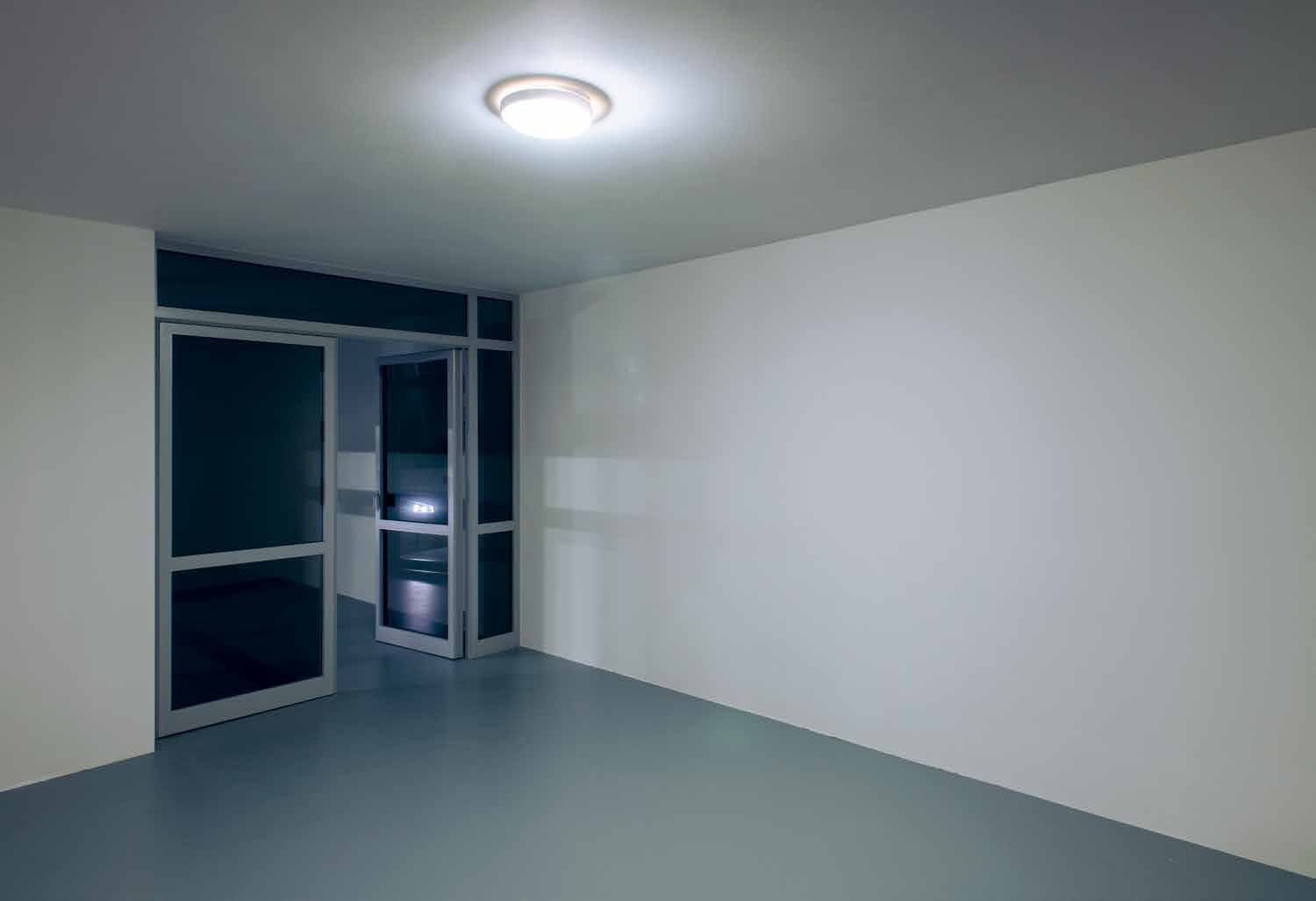
Buses, 2018, Israel Museum of Art, Entrance

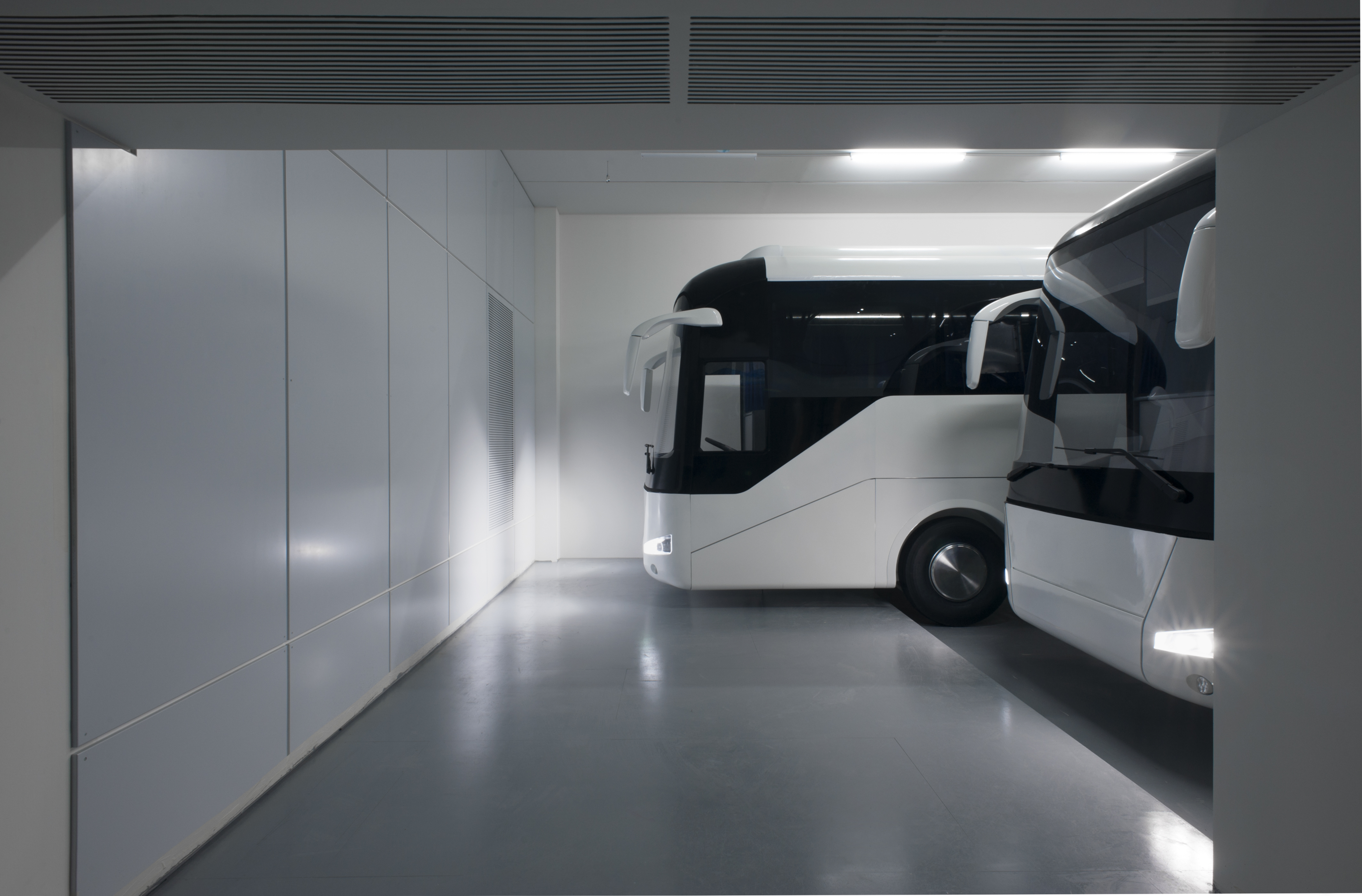
Buses, 2018, Israel Museum of Art, Without Doors

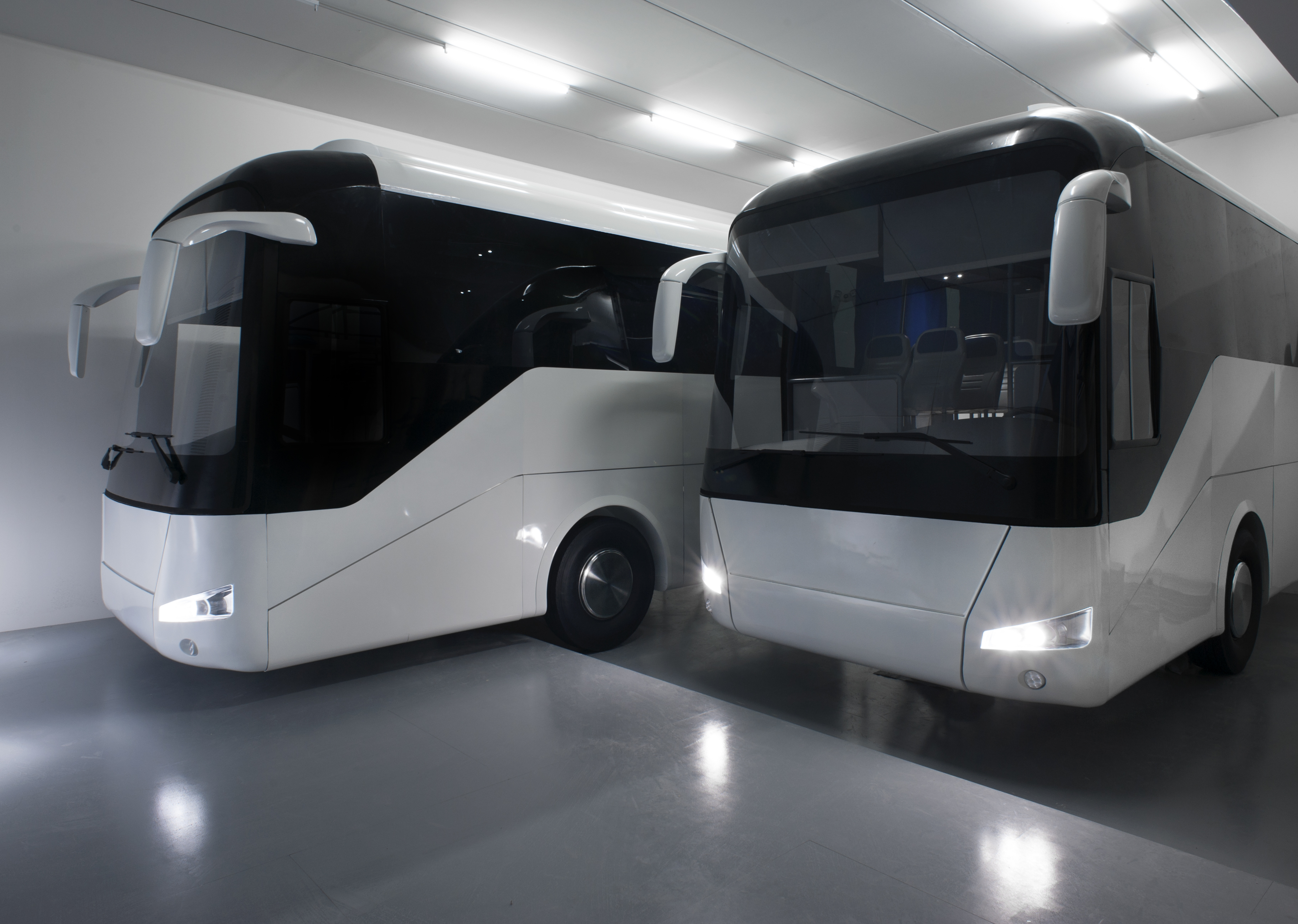
Buses, 2018, Israel Museum of Art, Interior

Gil Marco Shani (Hebrew: גיל מרקו שני; born 1968) is an Israeli painter, installation artist and educator, who lives and works in Tel Aviv.

== Biography ==
Gil Marco Shani was born in 1968 to Aaron and Leah Shani and raised in Tel Aviv, Israel. He graduated from the Bezalel Academy of Arts and Design, Jerusalem, Bachelor of Arts (1994), studied Art Studies at the Slade School, London (1994) and Shoe Design at Afpic Vocational Training School, Paris (1998).

Gil Marco Shani is a painter and installation artist. He has received awards including the Gottesdiener Art Prize for Young Artists 2008 and the Sandberg Prize for Israeli Art 2018. His paintings are part of the permanent collections of the Tel Aviv Museum of Art, and the Israel Museum of Art.

In 1994, he exhibited in Transit as part of Art Focus and in 1997, he participated in Decorative Attendants, which merged human presence with exhibition objects as part of Threshold in the Young Artists Exhibitions series held at the Israel Museum, curated by Sarit Shapira. This series, dedicated to installation art, was a milestone in the development of installation art in Israel in the 1990s. In 1999, Shani's solo exhibition Friendship was held at the Dvir Gallery. In 2001 Shani built Safari, an installation, as part of Helena (with Avner Ben-Gal and Ohad Meromi), an exhibit at the Helena Rubinstein Contemporary Art Pavilion, the Tel Aviv Museum of Art.

From the Sandberg Prize for Israeli Art committee: ['His paintings feature a schematic outline on a uniform background, and they mark events, many of which bubble under the surface of polite culture. Shani's superb installations are challenging architectural interventions implanted in the heart of the museum and examine the basic assumptions of the museum experience in all its aspects. The spaces he created, such as: motel rooms, tropical forest, nightly stairway or enclosed bus depot, are surprising environments, charged and rich in details. Shani succeeds in surprising visitors each time in an artificial environment, full of beauty that is enveloped by a petrifying silence and feelings of threat and anxiety. The ambitious installation "Busses," which is currently on display at the Israel Museum, is one of the highlights of his work and a major achievement in Shani's consistent body of work.'

Shani is a faculty member and senior lecturer at the Art Department, Bezalel Academy of Arts and Design. (Note: "Bezalel Academy of Arts and Design Faculty". Bezalel.)

In 2018, his son Lev was born in Tel Aviv, co-parented with Renan Mosinson.

== Exhibitions ==
=== Selected solo exhibitions ===
- 2018: 'Buses', The Israel Museum, Jerusalem; Curated by Aya Miron (catalogue)

=== Prizes and grants ===
- 1994: Mary Fisher Prize, Bezalel Academy of Arts and Design
- 1999: The Young Artist Award, Israel’s Ministry of Science, Culture and Sports
- 2001: Dizengoff Prize for Painting and Sculpture, Tel Aviv–Yafo municipality
- 2003: Beatrice Kolliner Prize for a Young Israeli Artist, The Israel Museum, Jerusalem
- 2004: America–Israel Cultural Foundation scholarship
- 2005: The Shmuel Givon Prize, Tel Aviv Museum of Art, Tel Aviv
- 2008: Nathan Gottesdiener Foundation Israeli Art Prize, Tel Aviv Museum of Art
- 2017: Outset Israel grant

— National Lottery Council for the Arts grant for publishing an artist’s book

- 2018: Sandberg Prize for Israeli Art 2018

== Artist books and catalogs ==
- 2000: "Friendship", Dvir Gallery
- 2001: Safari / Safari, Tel Aviv Museum
- 2001: Bird Watching School / Birding School, Tel Aviv Museum
- 2007 Dome Gil Marco Shani, Revolver Press
- 2018: Buses, Israel Museum | English Buses Catalog, Buses Hebrew Catalog

== Gallery ==
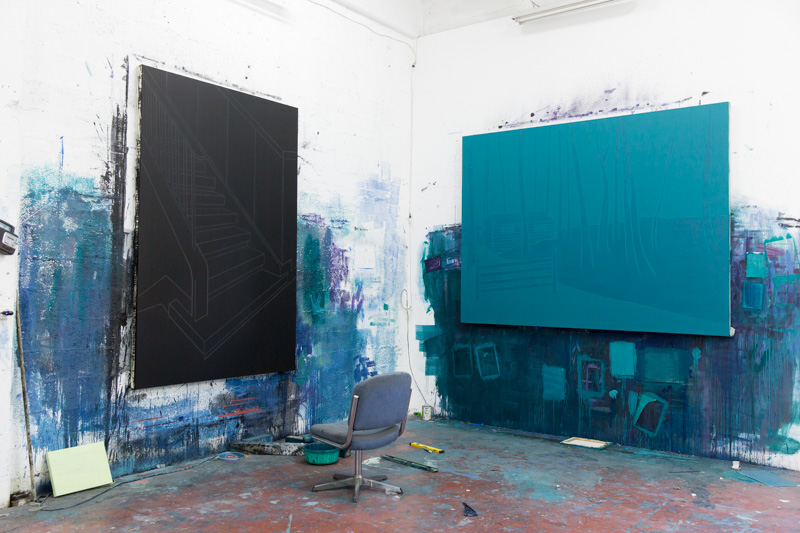
Studio View, TLV, 2016

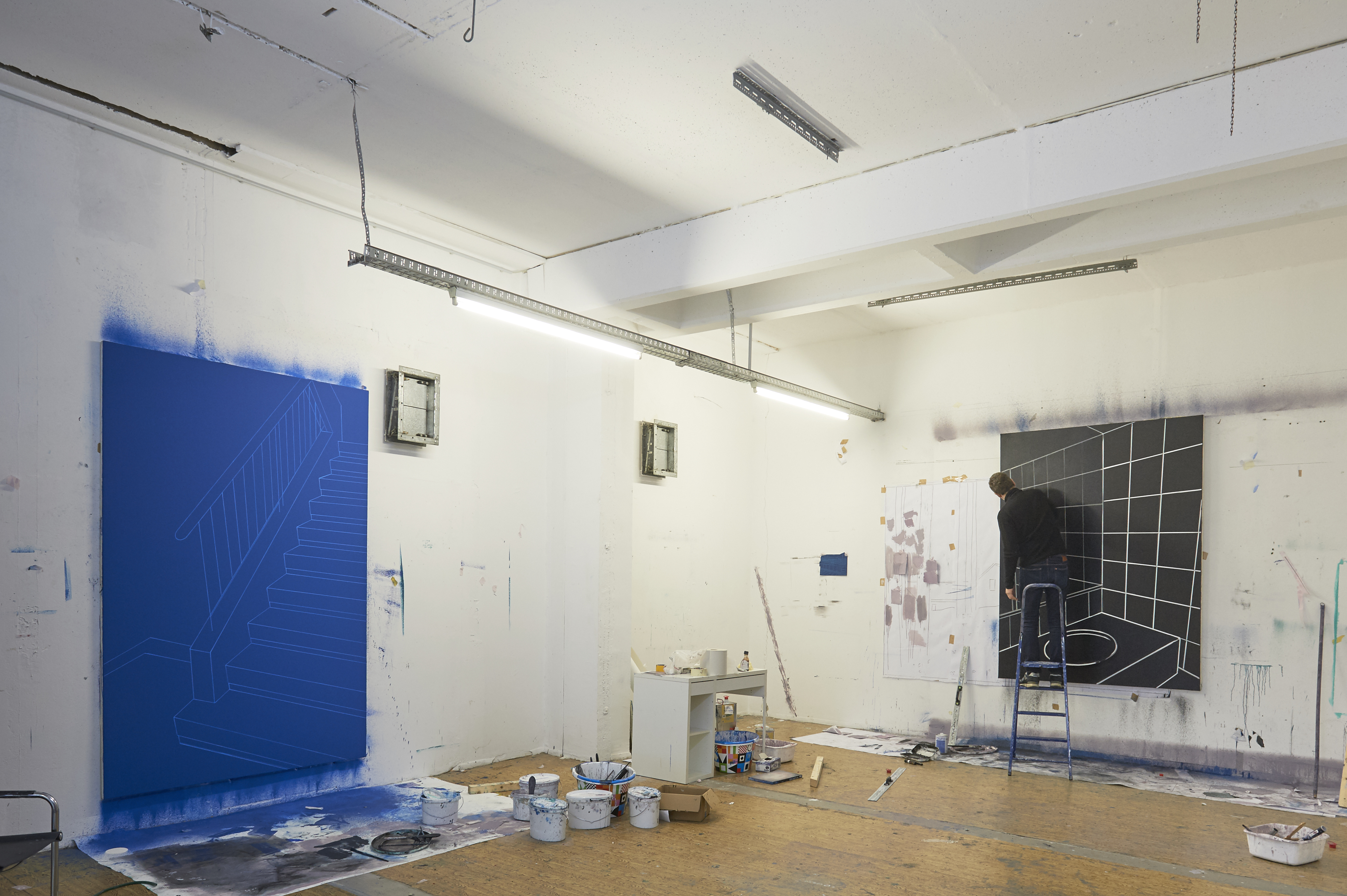
Studio View, Berlin, 2017

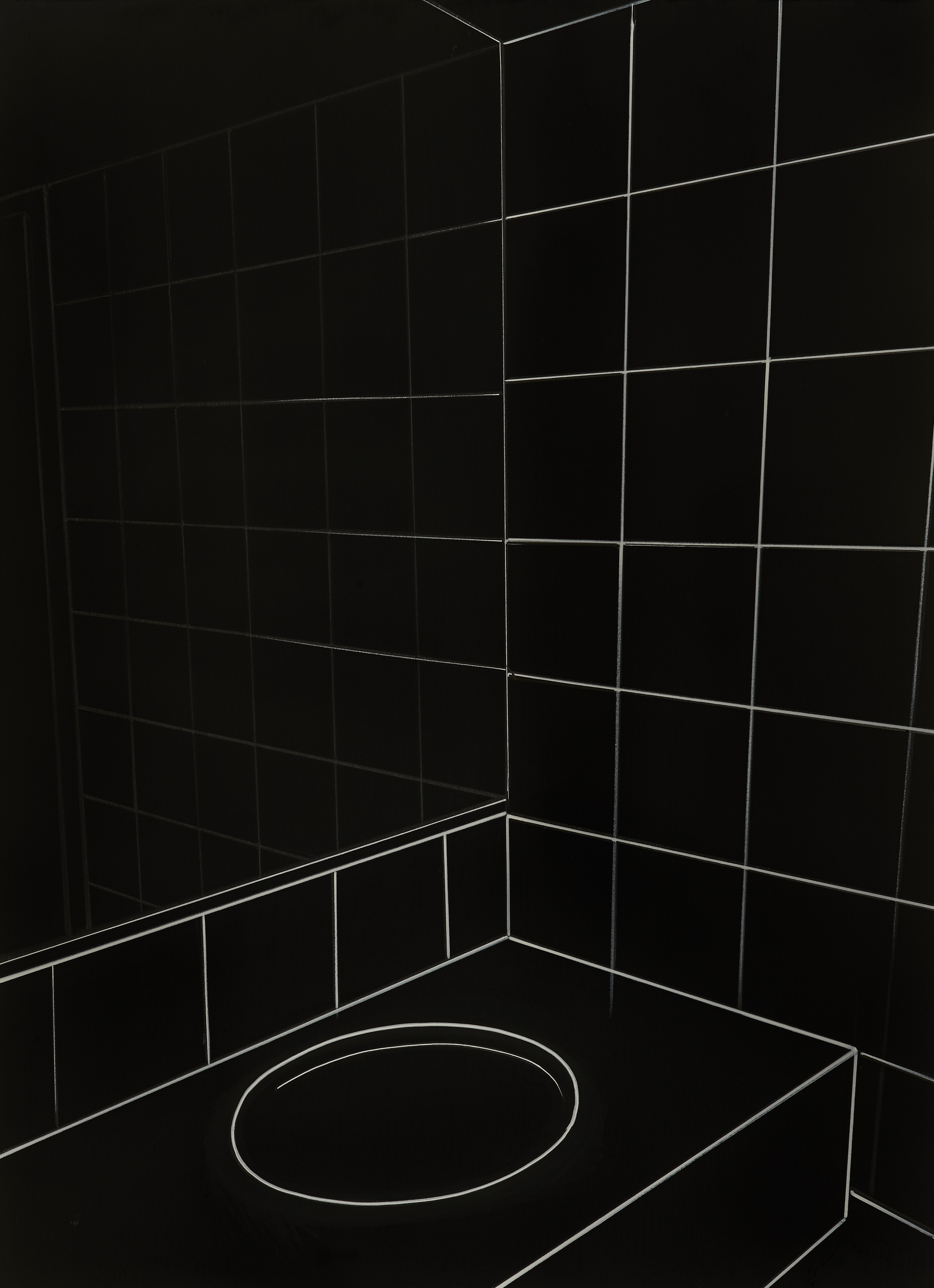
Mirror, Squares and Circle, Oil on Canvas

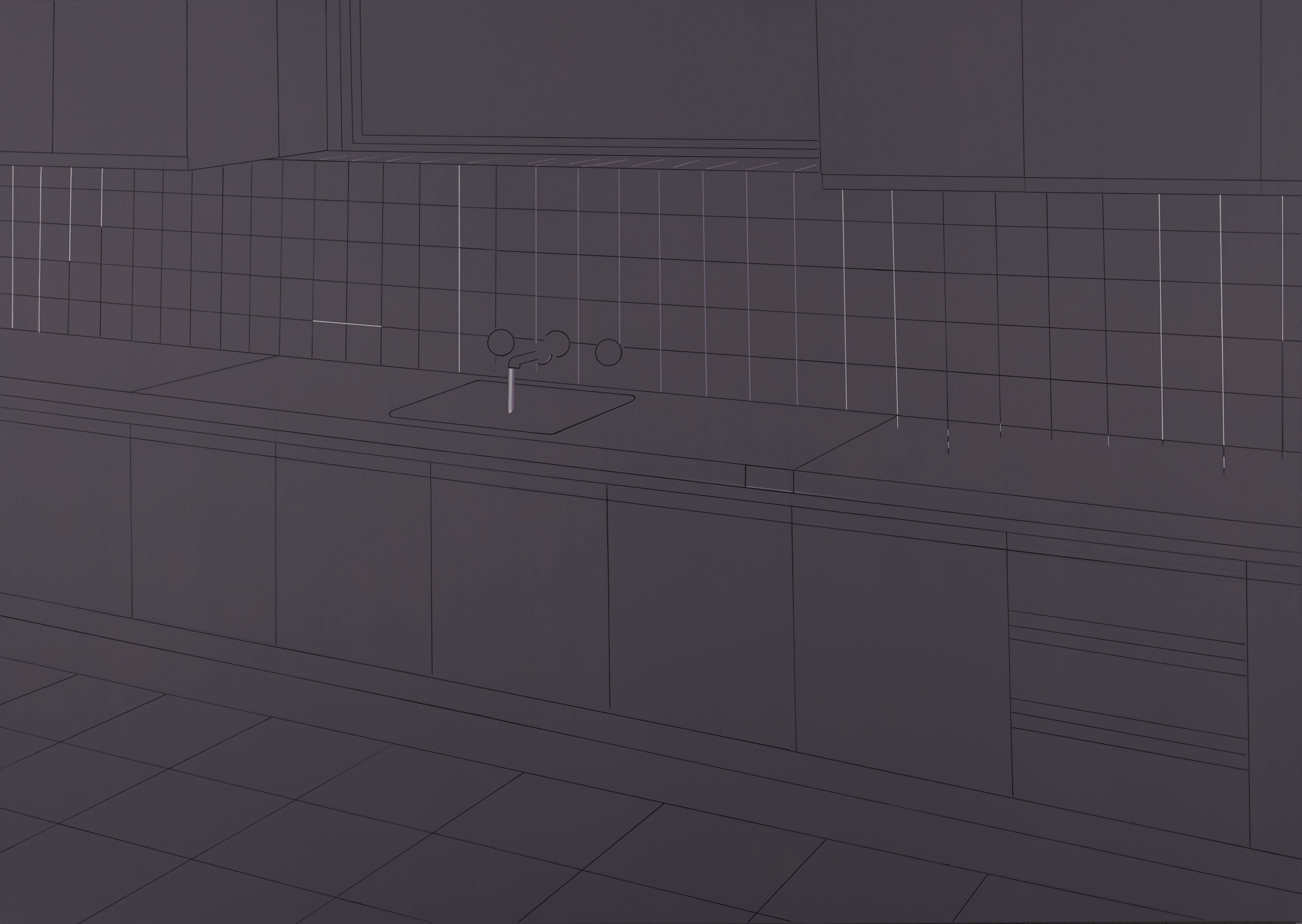
Kitchen 2, Oil on canvas, 230 cm X 300 cm

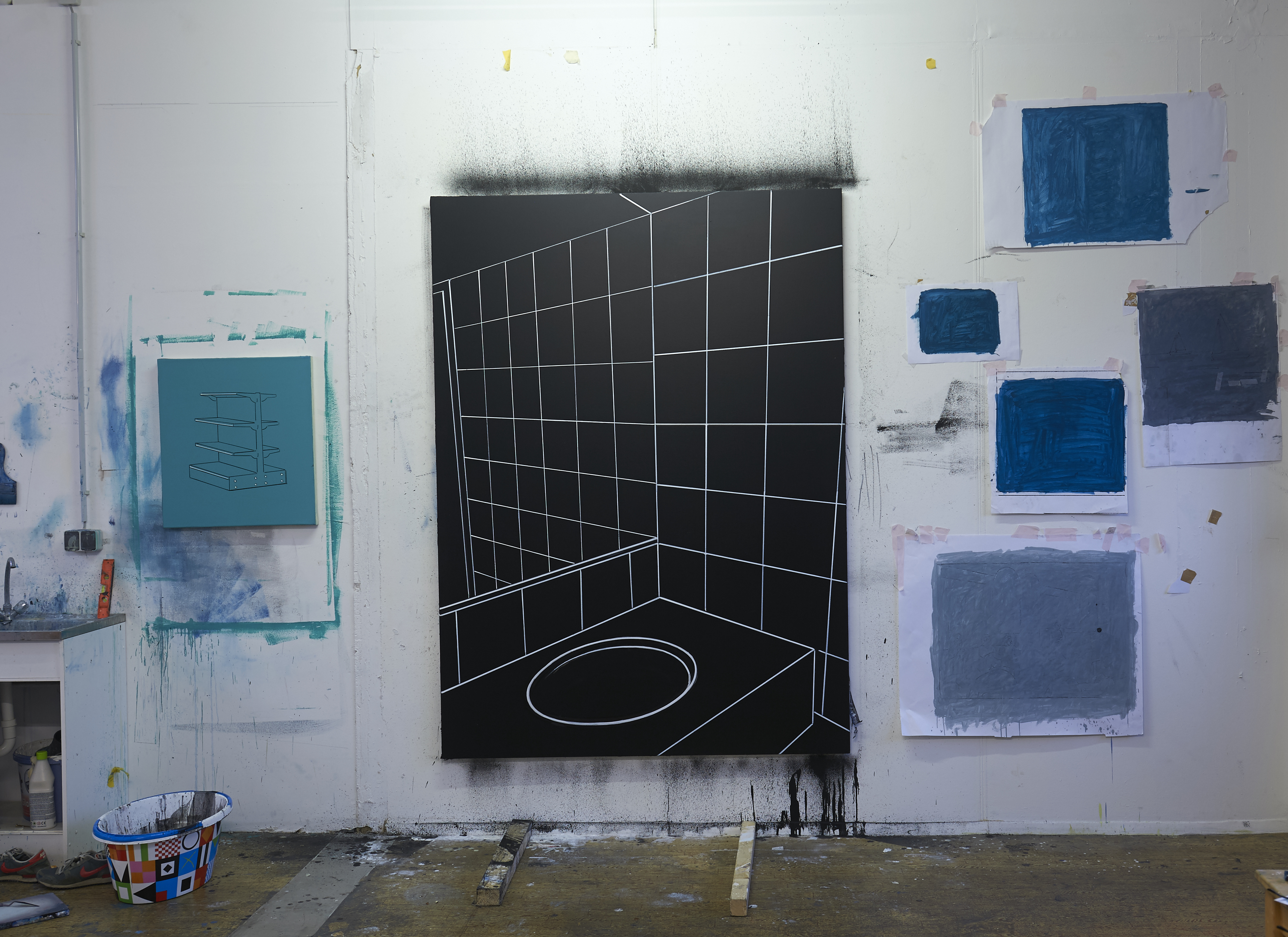
Studio View, Berlin, 2017

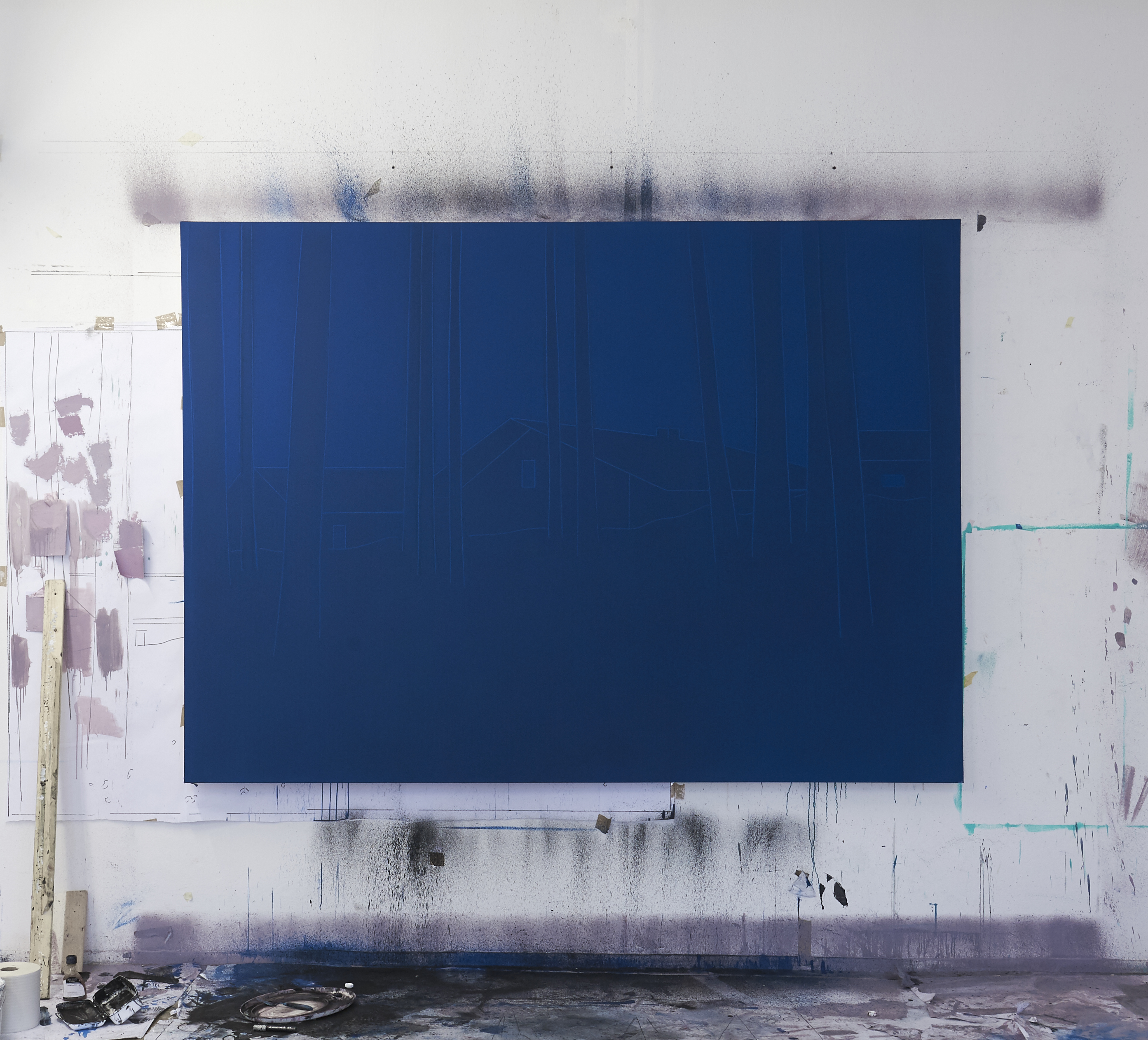
Studio View, Berlin, Grove Oil on Canvas

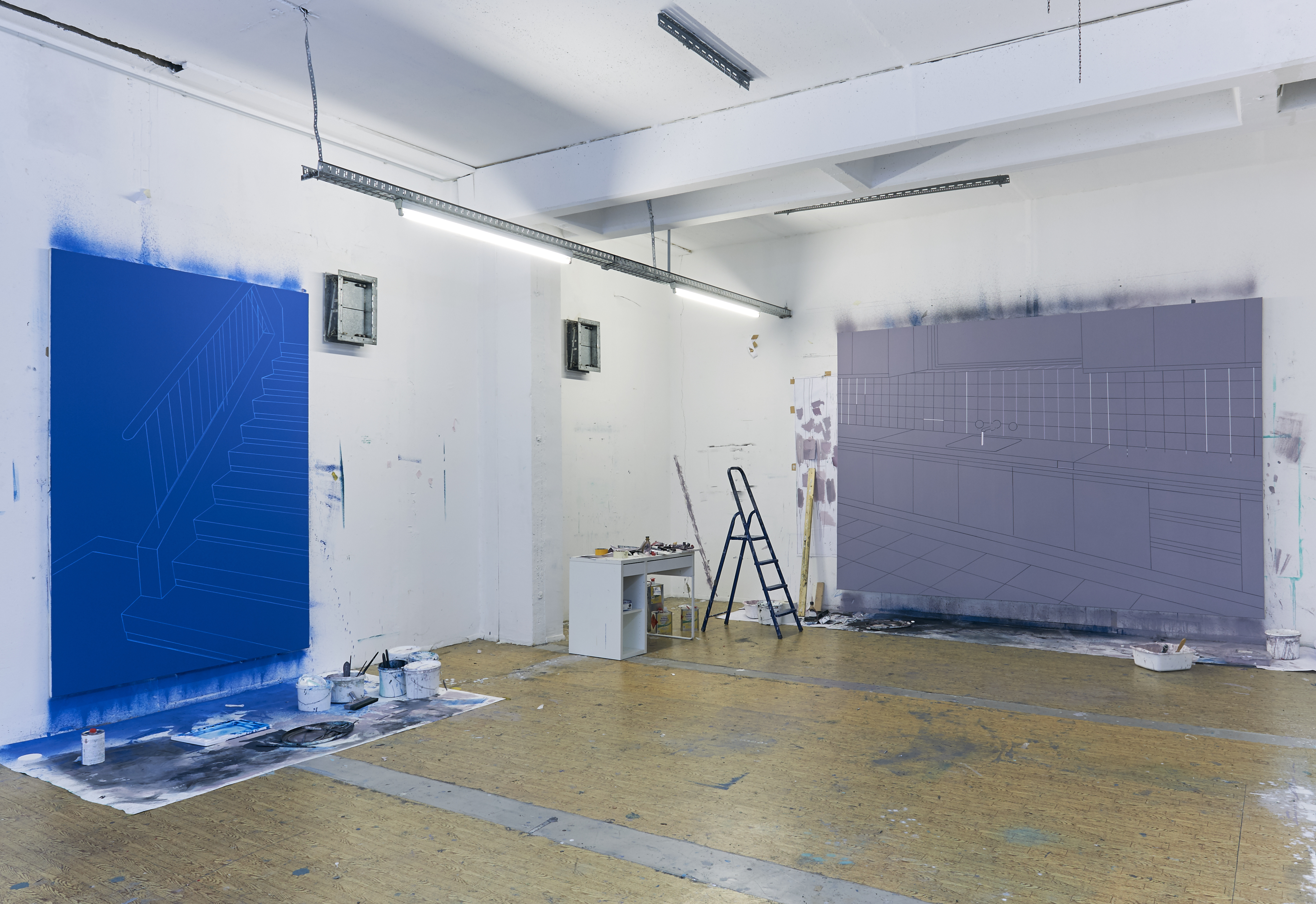
Studio View, Berlin, Stairwell and Kitchen

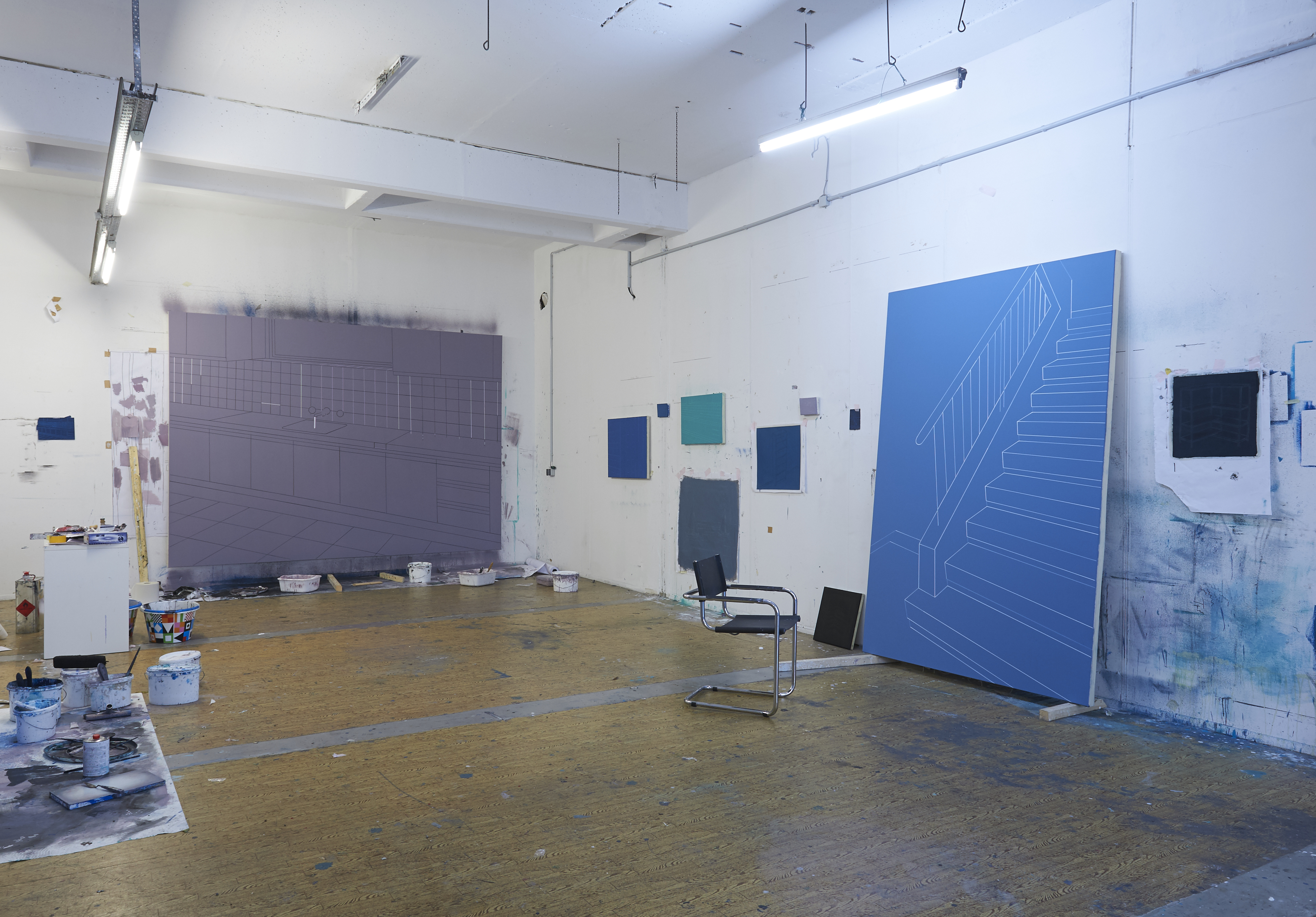
Studio View, Berlin, Stairwell 2 and Kitchen 2

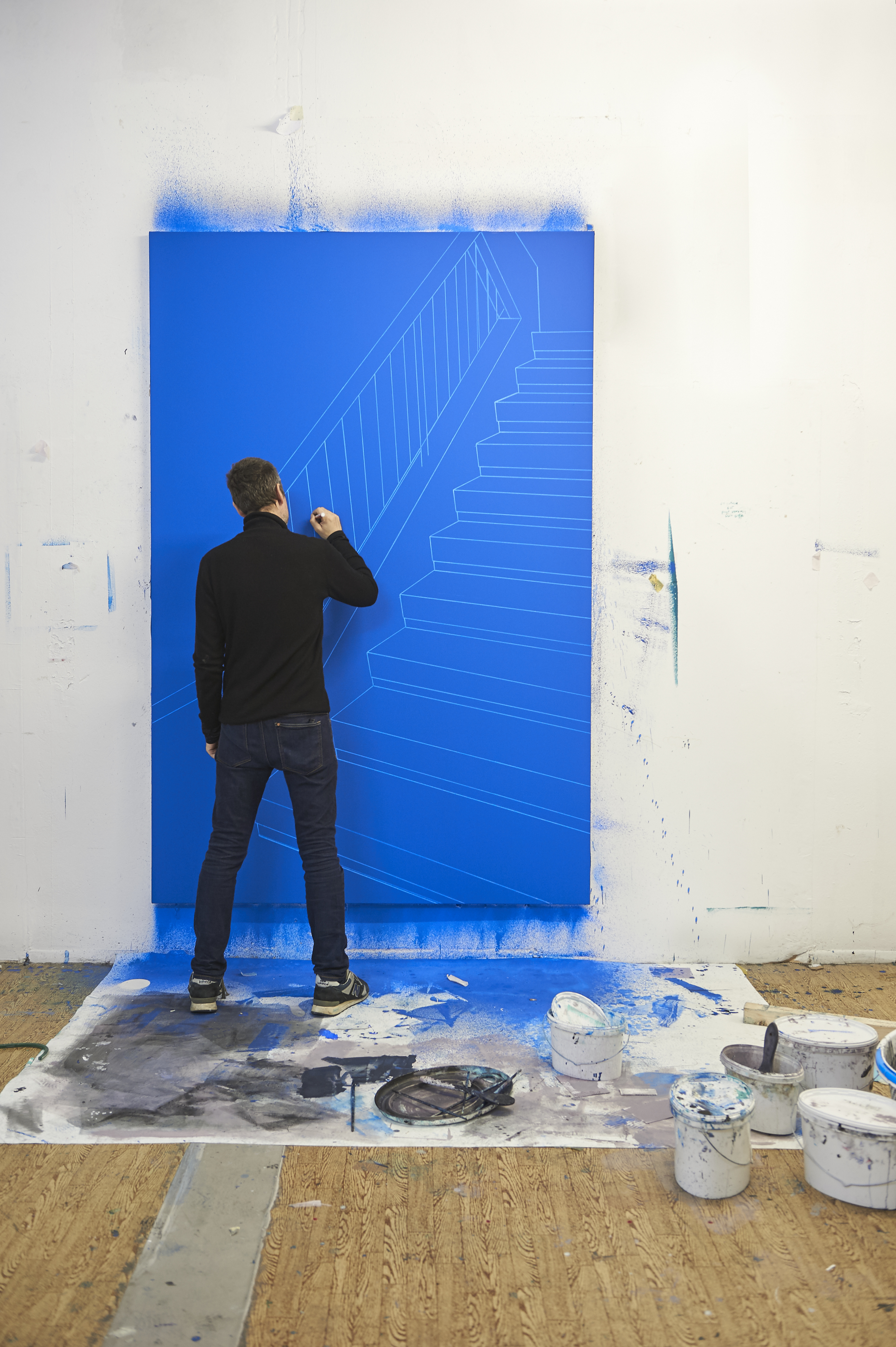
Self Portrait, Berlin, 2017

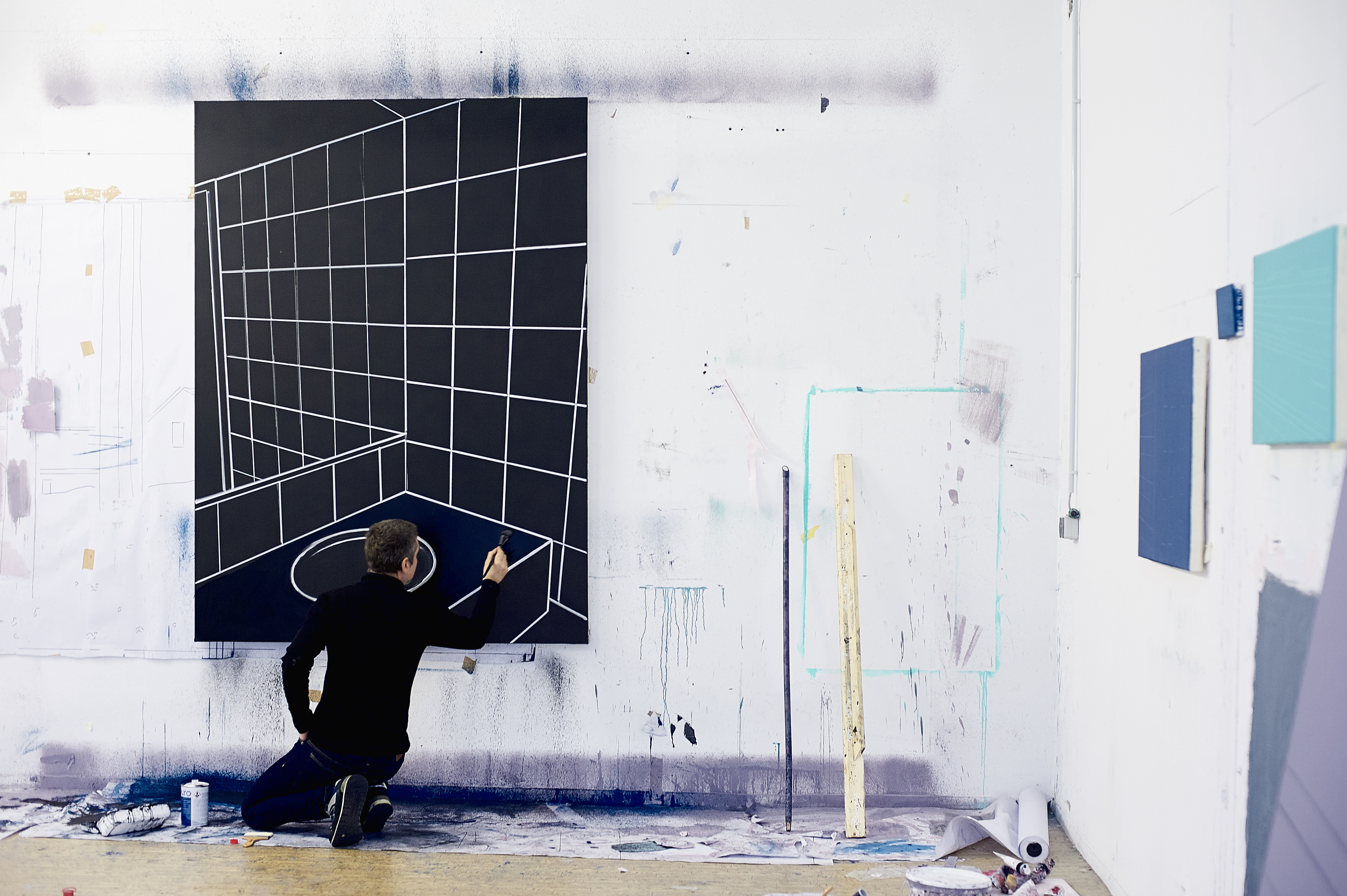
Self Portrait 2, Berlin, 2017
