= Gideon Ofrat =

Israeli art historian

Gideon Ofrat גדעון עפרת
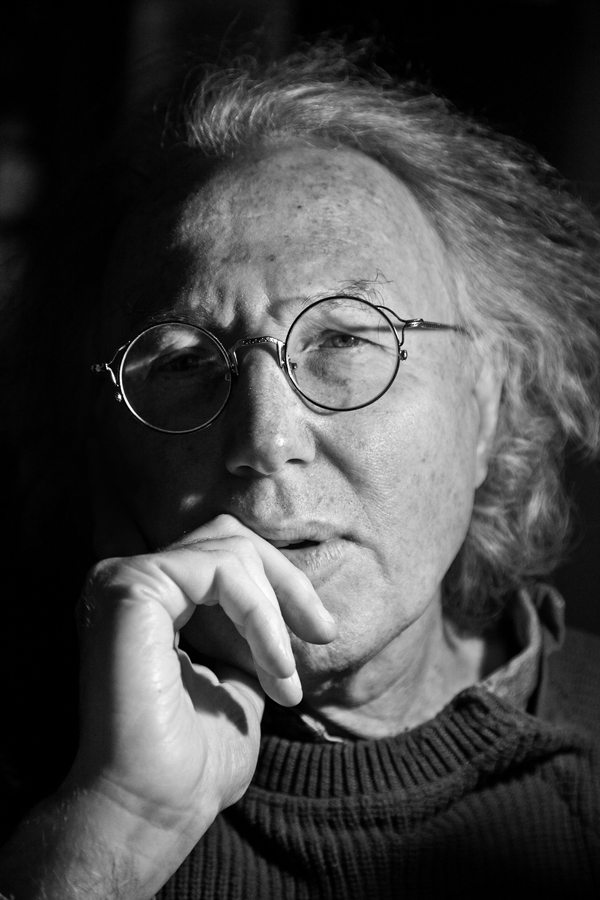
- Born: Gideon Fridlander; 1945 (age 80–81); Tel Aviv
- Education: Tel Aviv University; The Hebrew University of Jerusalem
- Known for: Art historian, art curator

Gideon Ofrat (Hebrew: גדעון עפרת; born in 1945) is a leading Israeli art historian, art curator and art critic, who specializes in Israeli art. He has curated numerous exhibitions in museums and galleries and written numerous articles, catalogs, and books in the field of Israeli art, the theory of aesthetics, and general philosophy.

== Biography ==
Ofrat was born in Tel Aviv in 1945 by the name Gideon Fridlander. He received his bachelor's degree in 1968 from Tel Aviv University, and his master's degree in 1970 from Tel Aviv University (including a year at Brown University in Providence, Rhode Island). In 1974 he completed a doctorate at the Hebrew University of Jerusalem. The subject of the doctoral dissertation was "The Definition of Art (in Hebrew: הגדרת האמנות" and it was later published as a book by the same name, by HaKibbutz Hameuchad.

Between 1970 and 1981 he taught modern drama in the Department of Theater at the Hebrew University of Jerusalem, and from 1972 to 1995 he was a senior lecturer of philosophy at the Bezalel Academy of Art and Design in Jerusalem. He has also been a guest lecturer on Israeli art at various institutions in Israel, the US and Canada.

In 1976 and 1979, he curated the first performance festivals in Israel: "Exhibit 76" and "Exhibit 79", at the Artists' House in Tel Aviv, and even coined the Hebrew term for performance art (Meitzag) and for installation art (Meitzav). In 1980–1981 he curated nine pioneering exhibitions concentrated on the subject of the rise of postmodernism in Israeli art, at the Artists' House in Jerusalem. From 1980 to 1996, he curated more than 20 historical exhibitions on the subject of Israeli art in museums and art spaces in Israel and the United States.

In 1990, he curated an exhibition under the name "Portrait of the Leader in Israeli Art" for the Eretz Israel Museum, which was to be displayed at the Independence House (formerly Independence Hall), a museum located in the Dizengoff House on Rothschild Boulevard in Tel Aviv. However, shortly before the opening of the exhibition, it was decided that the exhibition, which presented leaders in an unflattering light, was not suitable for display there. Finally, the exhibition was presented at the Ein Harod Art Center. From 1993 to 1995, Ofrat curated the Israeli pavilion at the Venice Biennale, where he presented, among other things, Avital Geva's unique greenhouse project.

In 1993–1994 he was an art lecturer at the University of Haifa, and from 1998 to 2000 he was a lecturer of philosophy and art at the Alma House of Hebrew Culture College and at the Open University of Tel Aviv. From 2001 to 2000 he was a lecturer in the fields of philosophy and cinema at the Jerusalem Cinematheque and a visiting professor at the Yeshiva University in New York. From 2002 to 2005, he served as artistic director and chief curator of "Time for Art", an exhibition space in Tel Aviv. He was the curator (together with Galia Bar-Or) of the exhibition "Hegemony and Multiplicity – The 1950s in Israeli Art" at Ein Harod museum. The emphasis in his artistic activities is on local art. As a curator and historian, he works in full collaboration with the art field – with the artists themselves, with family archives and with museums in the periphery of Israel.

Ofrat was married to photographer Aliza Auerbach until her death in 2015. He currently lives in Jerusalem.

== Publications ==
Ofrat published several books and hundreds of essays and catalogs in Israel and beyond. He has authored over 100 catalogs for various Israeli artists and group exhibitions, often focusing on forgotten movements and artists. His research and writing have contributed greatly to the Israeli art bookshelf. Among the books he has published are The Story of Israeli Art (in Hebrew: סיפורה של אמנות ישראל. together with Dorit Levita), Masada Publishing, 1980; Bezalel – 100 Years, three volumes (in Hebrew: ספר בצלאל 100, co-edited with David Tartakover) Mifal Hapayis Publishing, Bezalel, 2006; Minor art – Israeli art at the dawn of the 21st century (in Hebrew: אמנות מינורית – אמנות ישראלית בשחר שנות האלפיים), Omanut Israel publishing, 2010; The Jewish Derrida, Syracuse University Press, 1998; and 100 Years of Art in Israel, Westview Press, 1998. In 2024, his book, Moscow-Jerusalem: Russian art in Israel, was published.

== Awards ==
Ofrat is the winner of the Curator Award for 2009 on behalf of the Israeli Ministry of Culture. In 2013, he was awarded the Yakir Bezalel award. In 2015, he received the Lifetime Achievement Award for research on the history of Israel and its settlement on behalf of Yad Ben-Zvi.
