= Michael Druks =

Israeli-born British artist

Michael Druks מיכאל דרוקס
- Born: September 26, 1940; Jerusalem, Mandatory Palestine
- Died: April 22, 2022 (aged 81)
- Known for: Painting, Conceptual Art
- Movement: Contemporary art

Michael Druks (Hebrew: מיכאל דרוקס; 1940–2022) was an Israeli-born British artist.

== Biography ==
Michael Druks was born in Jerusalem, Mandatory Palestine on September 26, 1940. He has lived in London since 1972 and has dual Israeli-British citizenship. Died on 22 April 2022 in London, U.K.

Druks grew up in Tel Aviv where he studied at the High Institute for Painting and became involved in avant-garde art and theatre circles. He organized group exhibitions based around concerns for the natural environment, including Plus Air Pollution at the Gordon Gallery in Tel Aviv, and Environment Paintings and Sculptures at the Billy Rose Sculpture Pavilion at the Israel Museum in Jerusalem in 1970. In the same year Druks received the Creative Artists Working Grant from the Sharett Foundation Fund, and had his environmental installations exhibited at the Israel Museum. In 1971, he participated in the 'Concepts and Information Show'.

By the late 1960s, Druks, having established himself as a leading young Israeli artist, decided to travel abroad. He arrived in Europe in the early 1970s, and after a period in Holland, settled in England where he became known for his conceptual work, with solo exhibitions in the 1970s at the Modern Art Oxford; The Whitechapel Gallery, London; De Appel, Amsterdam; The Centre Pompidou, Paris; Serpentine Gallery, London; documenta 6, Kassel; and the Institute of Contemporary Arts, London.

Druks's print Druksland: Physical and Social (1974), a conceptual map, has become an iconic image in both Israeli and International art, and has been featured in numerous exhibitions, books, magazines, exhibition catalogues and posters.

Since the early 1980s, Druks has concentrated primarily on painting, making works he says are “details detached from a context” that require time and active participation from the viewer.

Druks' work has been exhibited in Cologne, Maastricht, Berlin, Brussels, Montreal, Bern, Buenos Aires, Caracas and São Paulo.

== Awards and recognition ==
- 1968–69, Scholarship for a Young Artist, Sharret Fund, America-Israel Cultural Foundation
- 1970 The America-Israel Cultural Foundation, Sharett Fund Scholarship
- 1970 America-Israel Cultural Foundation, Work Grant
- 1970 Herman Struck Prize for Excellence, Bezalel Academy of Arts and Design,
- 1970 British Council Scholarship for Study in Britain
- 1972 Aika Braun Prize for a Young Artist, Israel Museum, Jerusalem
- 1973 Sandberg Prize for Israeli Art, Israel Museum, Jerusalem

== Education ==
- 1967 – Art Institute, Bat-Yam
- 1967 – The High Institute for Painting, Tel Aviv

== Teaching ==
- Bezalel Academy of Art and Design

== Selected solo exhibitions ==
- Michael Druks, Dugith Art Gallery, Tel Aviv, 1968.
- Michael Druks: Environment, Israel Museum, Jerusalem, October 6 – December 31, 1970.
- Michael Druks: Projection on Photographical Situations, Israel Museum, Jerusalem, November 8, 1983 – December 31, 1983.
- Michael Druks: Pictures, 1991–1992, Israel Museum, Jerusalem, October 1, 1992 – November 2, 1992.
- Druksland, Haifa Museum, 2004.
- Michael Druks: A Journey through Druksland 2007, Ein Harod Museum, Israel.
- Michael Druks, England & Co, London, 2013.
- Michael Druks: View, Material, Thought, Loushy Art & Projects, Tel Aviv, 2013.
- Michael Druks: Zoom Out, Weizmann Institute of Science, Rehovot, 2021.

== Selected group exhibitions ==
- Concepts + Information, Israel Museum, Jerusalem, February 2 - March 5, 1971
- Affidavit: Idea-Process-Document, 6 Israeli artists, House Gallery, London, 1972.
- 1st British International Drawings Biennale, Middlesbrough, 1973.
- Flexible Geography & Location Piece, Museum of Modern Art, Oxford, 1973.
- Off the Top of the Head, Art Meeting Place, London, 1974.
- Punishments, In-Out Centre, Amsterdam; Agora Studio, Maastricht, 1974.
- Video Travelling Show, Arnolfini Gallery, Bristol & Brighton Polytechnic, 1975.
- The Video Show, Serpentine Gallery, London, 1975.
- Artists Video Tapes, Palais des Beaux-Arts, Brussels, 1975.
- The 9e Biennale de Paris, 1975.
- Everybody’s Own Yard, a photographic study, Ideas Gallery, Whitechapel Art Gallery, London, 1976.
- Rencontre Internationale Ouverte de Video, Espace Pierre Cardin, Paris and Ferrara, 1975.
- NF2 Photography as Art, Gallery Grada Zagreb, 1976.
- Time, Words and the Camera, work by British artists travelling through Austria, 1976.
- Documenta 6, Kassel, 1977.
- Video Performance, Neue Gallery, Montreal, 1977.
- Photography as Art, Art as Photography, organised by Fotoforum, travelled to Kassel, London,
- USA, 1977.
- Artist & Society, Tel Aviv Museum, 1978.
- Ambiguous Definitions, ICA, London, 1978.
- The Kadishman Connection, Israel Museum, Jerusalem, January 13, 1979 – May 31, 1979.
- Performance, Centre d’art et Communication, Centre Pompidou, Paris, 1979.
- Borders, Israel Museum, Jerusalem, March 18, 1980 – June 30, 1980
- Milestones in Israeli Art, Israel Museum, Jerusalem, December 8, 1985 – March 3, 1986
- 1965 Today, Israel Museum, Jerusalem, Spertus Gallery, Palevsky Design Pavilion, Ayala Zacks Abramov Pavilion for Israeli Art, March 31, 2015 – August 29, 2015
- The Listening Eye, Israel Museum, Jerusalem, December 7, 1993 – March 5, 1994
- Preview from the Rita and Arturo Schwarz Collection of Israeli Art – A Gift to the Israel Museum, Israel Museum, Jerusalem, June 13 – August 30, 1995
- Windows: Glimpses of Seven Themes in Israeli Art, Israel Museum, Jerusalem, February 4 – May 6, 1996
- Love at First Sight: The Vera and Arturo Schwarz Collection of Israeli Art, Israel Museum, Jerusalem, March 2 – June 23, 2001.
- The Map is Not the Territory 1, England & Co, London, 2001.
- The Map is Not the Territory 2, England & Co, London, 2002.
- The Map is Not the Territory 3, James Hockey Gallery, Farnham, UK (curated by Jane England), 2003.
- Beneath the Radar in 1970s London, England & Co, London, 2010.
- Atlas Critique, Parc Saint Leger Centre D'Art Contemporain, Paris, 2012.
- Contemporary Cartographies: Drawing Thought, CaixaForum, Barcelona, 2012.
- Wandering Lines: From Automatic Drawing to Abstraction, England & Co, London, 2012.
- Life: A User's Manual, Israel Museum, Jerusalem, April 12, 2011 – February 4, 2012.
- Hide and Seek: Works on Paper, Israel Museum, Jerusalem, March 20, 2014 – July 20, 2014
- Israeli Art: The Renewed Collection Galleries, Israel Museum, Jerusalem, May 11, 2015
- The Gallery House Archive Project, Goethe Institute, London, 2016
- Wire(less) Connections, Israel Museum, Jerusalem, May 27, 2016 – March 18, 2017.
- Map, Map on the Wall, Mapping in Science and Art, Weizmann Institute of Science, Israel, 2017.
- This Way Out of England: Gallery House in Retrospect, Raven Row, London, 2017

== Bibliography ==
- Hans Ulrich Obrist, 'Interview with Michael Druks', RES, no. 11, April 2017.
- Galia Bar Or, Michael Druks: Travels in Druksland, Museum of Art, Ein Harod, 2007.
- Arturo Schwarz, Love at First Sight, The Israel Museum, Jerusalem, 2001.

== See also ==
Visual arts in Israel
