= Ramat Gan Museum of Israeli Art =

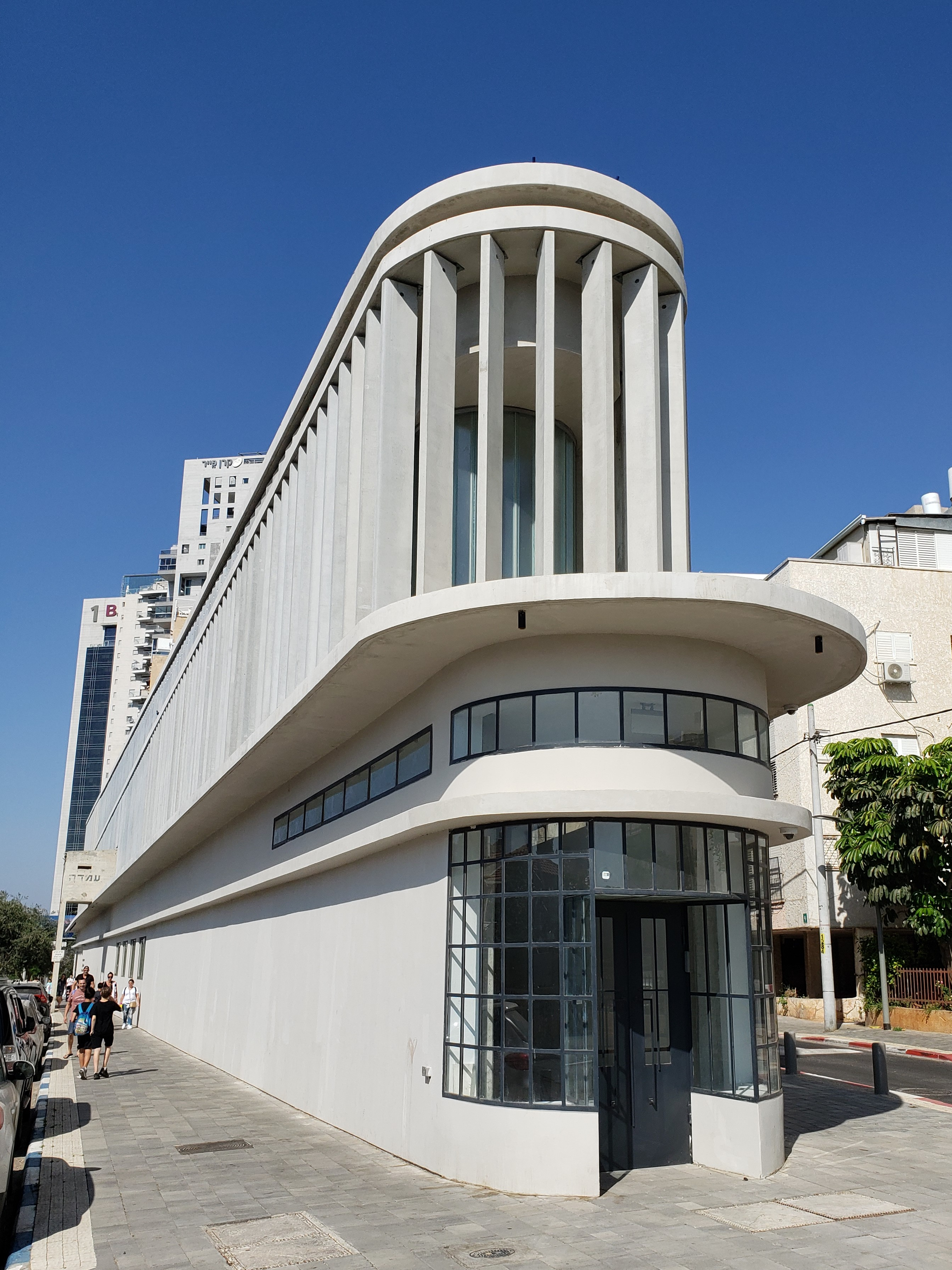
- Established: 1987
- Location: Abba Hillel Road 146, Ramat Gan, Tel Aviv District, Israel
- Coordinates: 32.094589°N 34.819306°E
- Type: Art museum
- Visitors: 23,000 (2012)
- Director: Ran Gwetta
- Website: rgma.org.il

The Ramat Gan Museum of Israeli Art is an art museum that displays Israeli art, located in the Tel Aviv District city of Ramat Gan, Israel. The museum was opened on 4 April 1987.

The museums hosts temporary and permanent exhibitions. Among artists presented in the museum are Arieh Aroch, Yitzhak Frenkel, Yehezkel Streichman and others.

== History ==
The building was built in the 1930s with the initial purpose of serving as an industrial plant. Prior to the opening of the museum, the building was converted into a museum space by architect Danny Schwarz, in order to serve its new purpose. In 2012, the museum had 23,000 visitors. The museum was closed for renovation in 2017 and reopened in 2021.

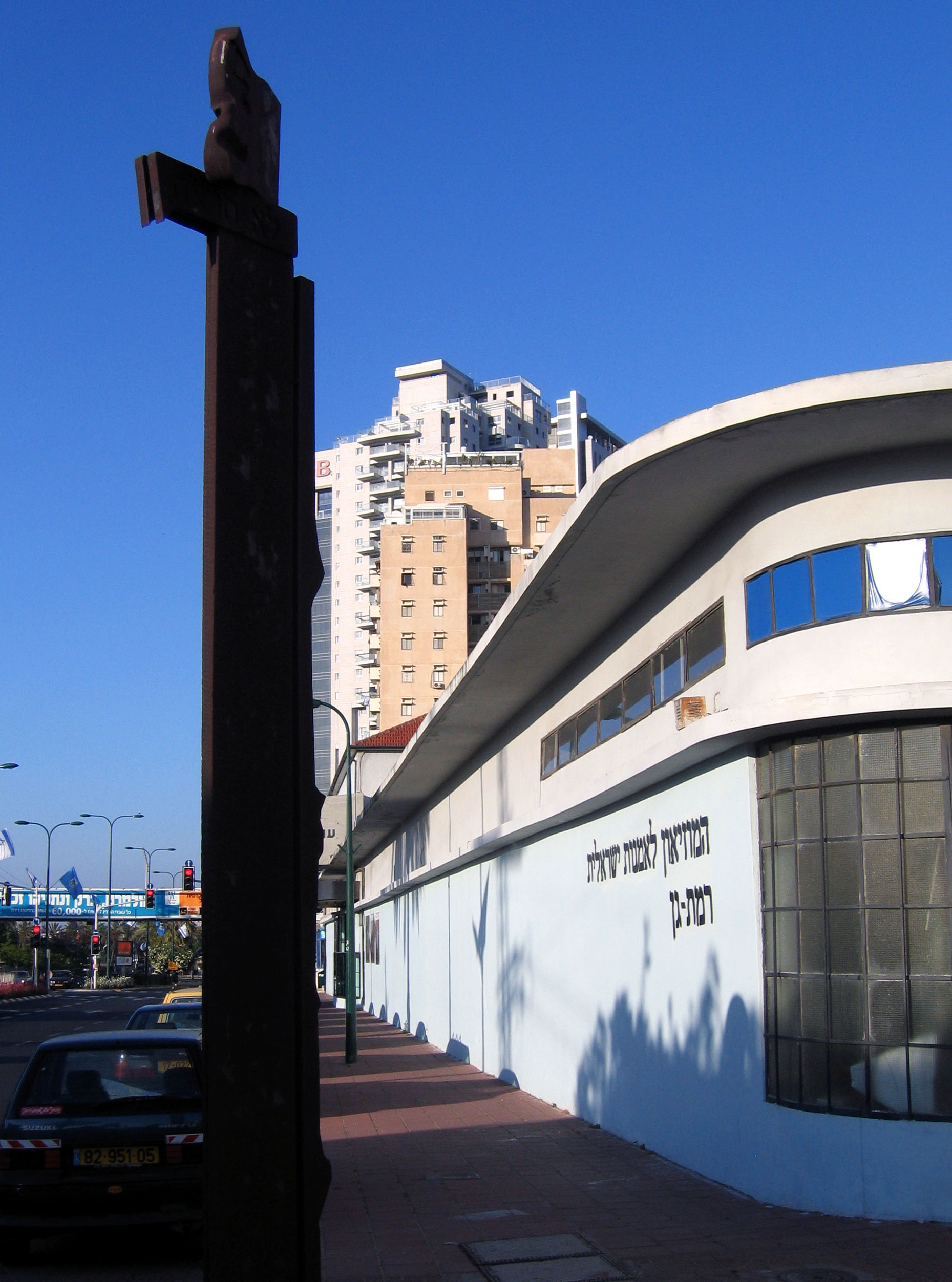
the monument in memory of Yitzhak Rabin

The museum has been showcasing eclectical exhibitions since the day of its opening. The current director is curator Meir Aharonson. Of the museum's most popular and prominent exhibitions, we can find photographer Simha Shimran's photography exhibition, curator Yehudit Mezkel's motherhood themed group exhibition, and more. As of 2022, the exhibitions include paintings, photographs, video, installation art and sculpture.

The museum found itself in the centre of controversy in 2021 when a painting which was deemed offensive to Haredi community was removed at the request of the mayor of Ramat Gan. Other artists whose works were displayed in the museum demanded that the museum remove their artworks, thus almost emptying the museum.

In 1996, near the entrance to the museum, the artist Igal Tumarkin placed a monument in memory of Yitzhak Rabin.

The museums hosts temporary and permanent exhibitions, showcasing Israeli art and artists. Among artists presented in the museum are Arieh Aroch, Yitzhak Frenkel, Yehezkel Streichman and others.

== See also ==
- List of Israeli museums
- Israeli art
