= Israeli sculpture =

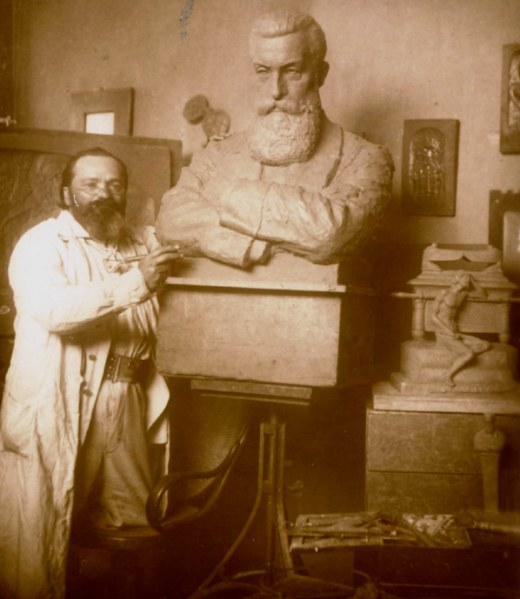
Boris Schatz sculpts the figure of Theodor Herzl

Israeli sculpture designates sculpture produced in the Land of Israel from 1906, the year the "Bezalel School of Arts and Crafts" (today called the Bezalel Academy of Art and Design) was established. The process of crystallization of Israeli sculpture was influenced at every stage by international sculpture. In the early period of Israeli sculpture, most of its important sculptors were immigrants to the Land of Israel, and their art was a synthesis of the influence of European sculpture with the way in which the national artistic identity developed in the Land of Israel and later in the State of Israel.

Efforts toward the development of a local style of sculpture began in the late 1930s, with the creation of "Caananite" sculpture, which combined influences from European sculpture with motifs taken from the East, and particularly from Mesopotamia. These motifs were formulated in national terms and strived to present the relationship between Zionism and the soil of the homeland. In spite of the aspirations of abstract sculpture, which blossomed in Israel in the middle of the 20th century under the influence of the "New Horizons" movement and attempted to present sculpture that spoke a universal language, their art included many elements of earlier "Caananite" sculpture. In the 1970s, many new elements found their way into Israeli art and sculpture, under the influence of international conceptual art. These techniques significantly changed the definition of sculpture. In addition, these techniques facilitated the expression of political and social protest, which up to this time had been downplayed in Israeli sculpture.

== History ==
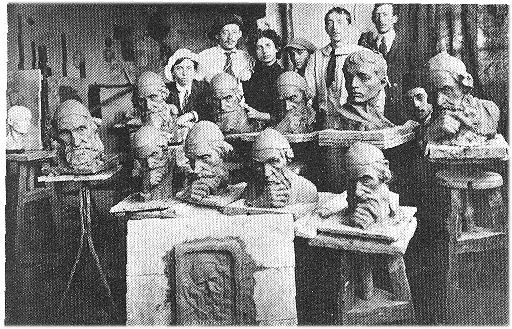
Bezalel sculpture class, 1914

An attempt to find indigenous 19th-century Israeli sources for the development of "Israeli" sculpture is problematic from two points of view. First, both the artists and Jewish society in the Land of Israel were lacking the national Zionist motifs which would accompany the development of Israeli sculpture in the future. This applies, of course, also to non-Jewish artists of the same period. Second, art history research has failed to find a tradition of sculpture either among the Jewish communities of the Land of Israel or among the Arab or Christian residents of that period. In research conducted by Yitzhak Einhorn, Haviva Peled, and Yona Fischer, artistic traditions of this period were identified, which include ornamental art of a religious (Jewish and Christian) nature, which was created for pilgrims and, therefore, for both export and local needs. These objects included decorated tablets, embossed soaps, seals, etc. with motifs borrowed for the most part from the tradition of graphic art.

In his article "Sources of Israeli Sculpture" Gideon Ofrat identified the beginning of Israeli sculpture as the founding of the Bezalel School in 1906. At the same time, he identified a problem in trying to present a unified picture of that sculpture. The reasons were the variety of European influences on Israeli sculpture, and the relatively small number of sculptors in Israel, most of whom had worked for long periods in Europe.

At the same time, even at the Bezalel – a school of art founded by a sculptor – sculpture was considered a lesser art, and the studies there concentrated on the art of painting and the crafts of graphics and design. Even in the "New Bezalel", founded in 1935, Sculpture did not occupy a significant place. While it is true that a department of sculpture was set up in the new school, it closed a year later, because it was viewed as a tool to help students learn three-dimensional design and not as an independent department. In its place a department of pottery opened and flourished. There were exhibitions by individual sculptors during these years both in the Bezalel Museum and in the Tel Aviv Museum, but these were exceptions and were not indicative of the general attitude toward three-dimensional art. An ambiguous attitude toward sculpture by the artistic establishment could be felt, in various incarnations, well into the 1960s.

=== Early sculpture in the Land of Israel ===
==== Bezalel and Jerusalem ====
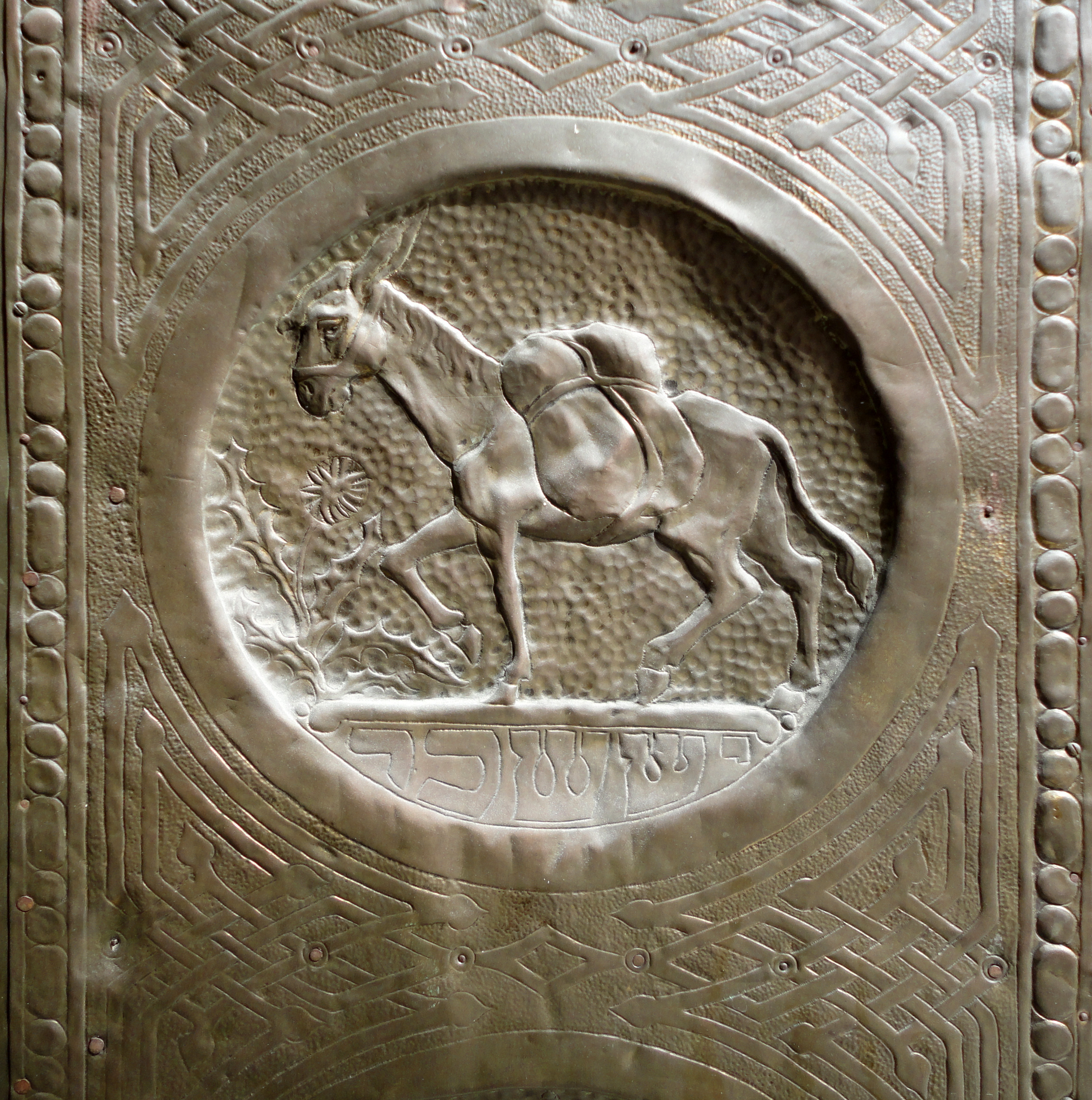
"Tribe of Issachar" by Ze'ev Raban, detail from a brass door at Bikur Cholim Hospital, Jerusalem

The beginning of sculpture in the Land of Israel, and of Israeli art in general, is usually designated as 1906, the year of the founding of the Bezalel School of Arts and Crafts in Jerusalem by Boris Schatz. Schatz, who studied sculpture in Paris with Mark Antokolski, was already a well-known sculptor when he arrived in Jerusalem. He specialized in relief portraiture of Jewish subjects in an academic style.

Schatz's work attempted to establish a new Jewish-Zionist identity He expressed this by using figures from the Bible within a framework derived from European Christian culture. His work "Matthew the Hasmoneum" (1894), for example, depicted the Jewish national hero Mattathias ben Johanan grasping a sword with his foot on the body of a Greek soldier. This kind of representation is connected to the ideological theme of "The Victory of Good Over Evil", as expressed, for example, in the figure of Perseus in a sculpture from the 15th century. Even a series of memorial plaques Schatz created for the leaders of the Jewish settlement is derived from Classical art, combined with the descriptive tradition in the spirit of the Ars Novo tradition. The influence of Classical and Renaissance art on Schatz can be seen even in the copies of sculptures he ordered for Bezalel, which he displayed in the Bezalel Museum as examples of ideal sculptures for the students in the school. These sculptures include "David" (1473–1475) and "Putto with a Dolphin" (1470) by Andrea del Verrocchio.

The studies at Bezalel tended to favor painting, drawing, and design, and as a result the amount of three-dimensional sculpture turned out there was limited. Among the few workshops which opened at the school was one in woodcarving, in which reliefs of various Zionist and Jewish leaders were produced, along with workshops in decorative design in applied art using techniques such as hammering copper into thin sheets, setting gems, etc. In 1912 a department for ivory design, which also emphasized the applied arts, was opened. In the course of its activities workshops were added that functioned nearly autonomously. In a memo issued in June 1924, Schatz outlined all of the major fields of activity of Bezalel, among them stone sculpture, which was founded primarily by students of the school within the framework of the "Jewish Legion" and the workshop on woodcarving.

Besides Schatz, there were several other artists in Jerusalem in the early days of Bezalel who were working in the field of sculpture. In 1912 Ze'ev Raban immigrated to the Land of Israel at Schatz's invitation and served as an instructor in sculpture, sheet copper work, and anatomy at Bezalel. Raban had trained in sculpture at the Academy of Fine Arts in Munich, and later at the Ecole des Beaux-Arts in Paris and the Royal Academy of Fine Arts in Antwerp, Belgium. In addition to his well-known graphic work, Raban created figurative sculptures and reliefs in the academic "Oriental" style, such as the terracotta figurine of the Biblical figures "Eli and Samuel" (1914), who are depicted as Yemenite Jews. However Raban's most important work focused on embossments for jewelry and other decorative items.

Other instructors at Bezalel also created sculptures in the realistic academic style. Eliezer Strich, for instance, created busts of people in the Jewish settlement. Another artist, Yitzhak Sirkin carved portraits in wood and in stone.

==== Land of Israel movement ====
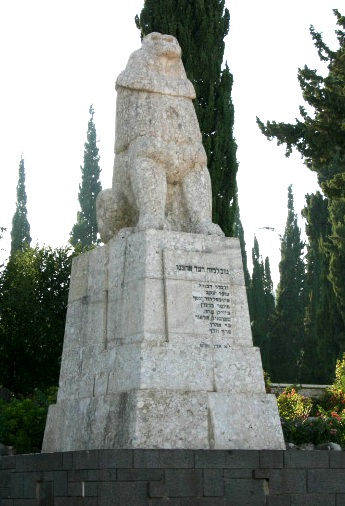
Abraham Melnikov The Roaring Lion, 1926–1934 Stone Tel Hai

The main contribution to Israel sculpture of this period can be contributed to Abraham Melnikov, who worked outside the framework of Bezalel. Melnikov created his first work in Israel in 1919, after he arrived in the Land of Israel during his service in the "Jewish Legion". Until the 1930s, Melnikov produced a series of sculptures in various kinds of stone, mostly portraiture done in terracotta and stylized images carved out of stone. Among his significant works is a group of symbolic sculptures depicting the awakening of the Jewish identity, such as "The Awakening Judah" (1925), or memorial monuments to Ahad Ha'am (1928) and to Max Nordau (1928). In addition, Melnikov presided over presentations of his works in exhibits of Artists of the Land of Israel in the Tower of David.

The "Roaring Lion" monument (1928–1932) is a continuation of this trend, but this sculpture is different in the way it was perceived by the Jewish public of that period. Melnikoff himself initiated the building of the monument, and funding for the project was attained jointly by the Histadrut ha-Clalit, the Jewish National Council, and Alfred Mond (Lord Melchett). The image of the monumental lion, sculpted in granite, was influenced by primitive art combined with Mesopotamian art of the 7th and 8th centuries A.D. The style is expressed primarily in the anatomical design of the figure.

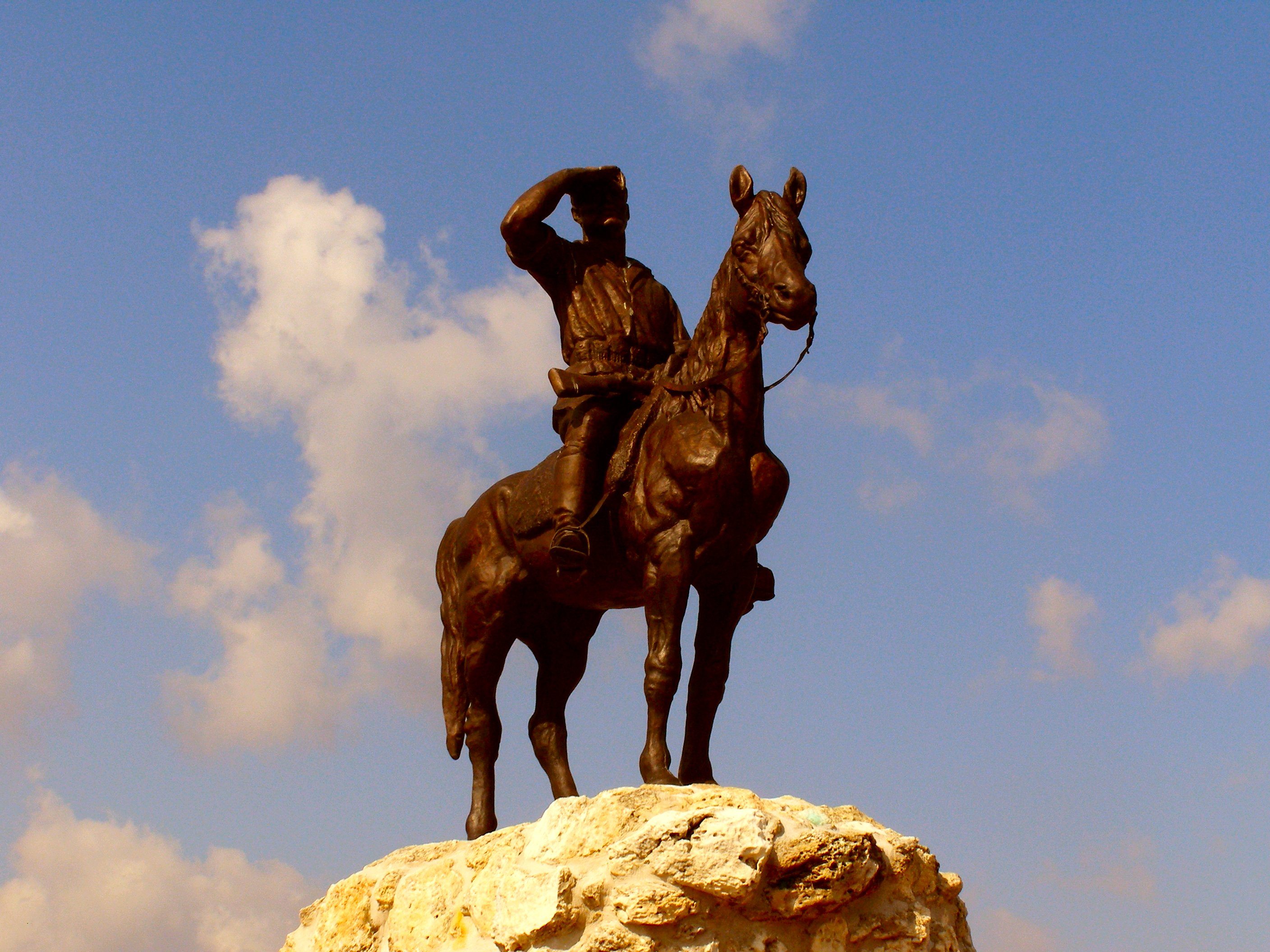
Alexander Zaïd monument by David Polus

The sculptors who started to produce works at the end of the 1920s and the beginning of the 1930s in the Land of Israel demonstrated a wide variety of influences and styles. Among them were a few who went by the teachings of the Bezalel School, while others, who arrived after studying in Europe, brought with them the influence of early French Modernism on art, or the influence of Expressionism, especially in its German form.

Among the sculptors who were Bezalel students, the works of Aaron Priver stand out. Priver arrived in the Land of Israel in 1926 and began to study sculpture with Melnikoff. His work displayed a combination of a tendency toward realism and an archaic or moderately primitive style. His feminine figures of the 1930s are designed with rounded lines and sketchy facial features. Another pupil, Nachum Gutman, better known for his paintings and drawings, traveled to Vienna in 1920, and later went to Berlin and Paris, where he studied sculpture and printmaking and produced sculptures on a small scale which show traces of expressionism and a tendency toward a "primitive" style in the depiction of its subjects.

The works of David Ozeransky (Agam) continued the decorative tradition of Ze'ev Raban. Ozeransky even worked as a laborer on the sculptural decorations Raban created for the YMCA building in Jerusalem. Ozeransky's most important work of this period is "Ten Tribes" (1932) – a group of ten square decorative tablets, which describe in symbolic terms the ten cultures associated with the history of the Land of Israel. Another work that Ozeranzky was involved in creating during this period was "The Lion" (1935) which stands atop the Generali Building in Jerusalem.

Although he was never a student at the institution, the work of David Polus was anchored in the Jewish academism which Schatz formulated at Bezalel. Polus began to sculpt after he was a stonemason in the labor corps. His first significant work was a statue of "David the Shepherd" (1936–1938) in Ramat David. In his monumental work 1940 "Alexander Zeid Memorial", which was cast in concrete at "Sheik Abreik" and stands near the Beit She'arim National Park, Polus represents the man known as "The Watchman" as a horseman looking out over the view of the Jezreel Valley. In 1940 Polus placed at the base of the monument two tablets, in archaic-symbolic style, whose subjects were "the thicket" and "the shepherd." While the style of the main statue is realistic, it became known for its attempt to glorify its subject and emphasize his connection with the land.

==== Modernist influences ====
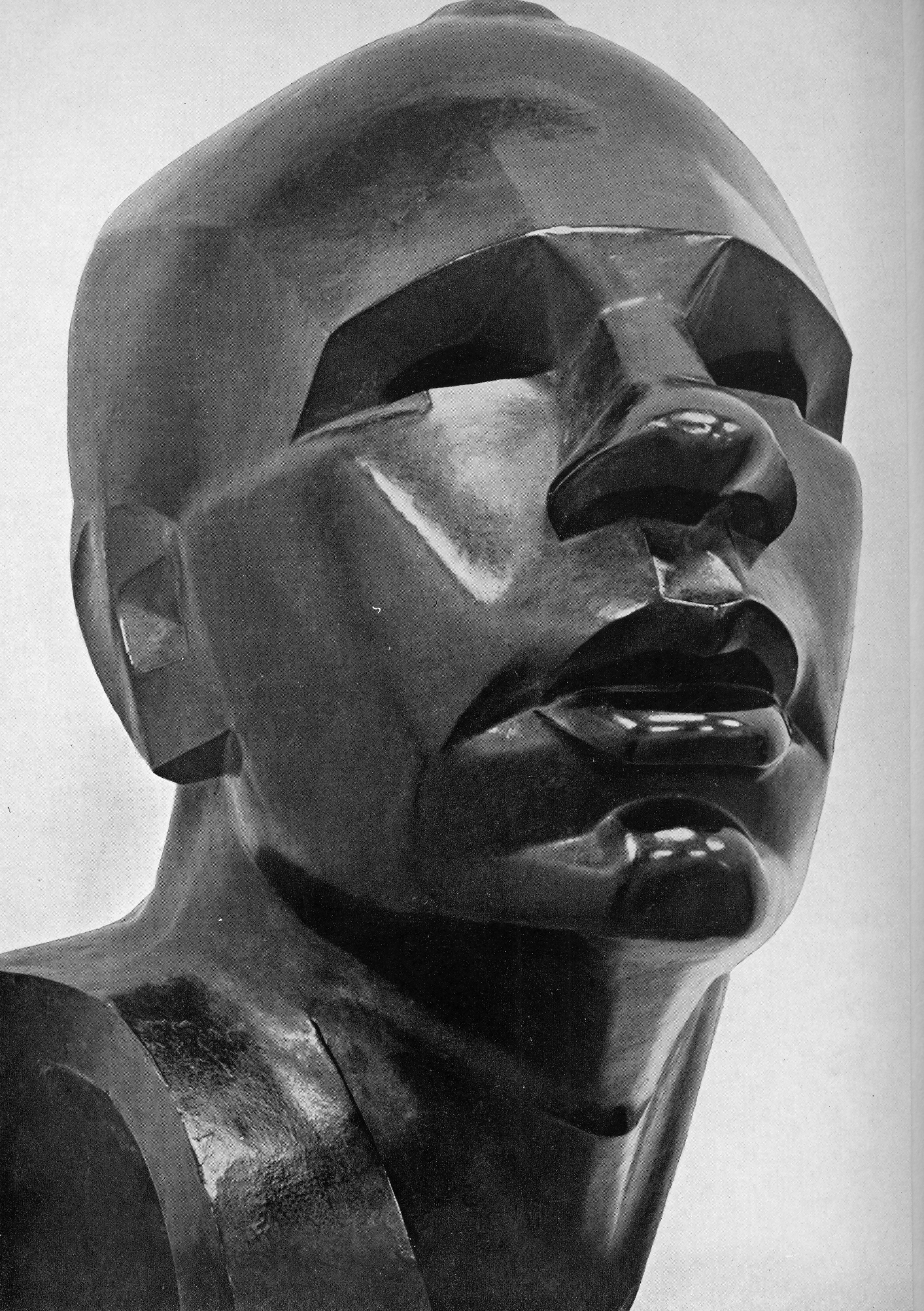
Aharon Meskin by Zeev Ben-Zvi

In 1910 the sculptor Chana Orloff emigrated from the Land of Israel to France and began studies in the École Nationale des Arts Décoratifs. Her work, beginning with the period of her studies, emphasizes her connection to the French art of the time. Particularly evident is the influence of Cubist sculpture, which moderated in her work with the passage of time. Her sculptures, mostly human images carved in stone and wood, designed as geometric spaces and flowing lines. A significant portion of her work is devoted to sculptural portraits of figures from French society. Her connection with the Land of Israel, Orloff preserved through an exhibition of her works in the Tel Aviv Museum.

Another sculptor who was greatly influenced by Cubism is Zeev Ben Zvi. In 1928, after his studies in Bezalel, Ben Zvi went to study in Paris. Upon his return, he served for short periods as an instructor in sculpture at Bezalel and at the "New Bezalel." In 1932 his first exhibition was held at the Bezalel national antiquities museum, and a year later he mounted an exhibition of his works at the Tel Aviv Museum. His sculpture "The Pioneer" was displayed at the Orient Fair in Tel Aviv in 1934. In Ben Zvi's work, as in Orloff's, the language of the Cubists, the language in which he designed his sculptures, did not abandon realism and stayed within the boundaries of traditional sculpture.

The influence of French realism can also be seen in the group of Israeli artists who were influenced by the realistic trend of early twentieth-century French sculptors like Auguste Rodin, Aristide Maillol, etc. The symbolic baggage of both their content and their style showed up as well in the work of Israeli artists, such as Moses Sternschuss, Raphael Chamizer, Moshe Ziffer, Joseph Constant (Constantinovsky), and Dov Feigin, most of whom studied sculpture in France.

One of this group of artists – Batya Lishanski – studied painting in Bezalel, and took courses in sculpture in the Parisian École nationale supérieure des Beaux-Arts. When she returned to Israel, she created figurative and expressive sculpture, which showed the clear influence of Rodin, who emphasized the corporeality of his sculptures. The series of monuments that Lishanski created, the first of which was "Labor and Defense" (1929), which was built over the grave of Ephraim Chisik - who died in the battle for the Hulda Farm (today, Kibbutz Hulda) - as a reflection of the Zionist utopia during that period: a combination of the redemption of the land and the defense of the homeland.

The influence of German art and particularly of German expressionism can be seen in the group of artists who arrived in the Land of Israel after receiving their training in art in various German cities and in Vienna. Artists such as Jacob Brandenburg, Trude Chaim, and Lili Gompretz-Beatus, and George Leshnitzer produced figurative sculpture, primarily portraiture, designed in a style that wavered between impressionism and moderate expressionism. Among the artists of that group Rudolf (Rudi) Lehmann, who started teaching art in a studio he opened in the 1930s, stands out. Lehmann had studied sculpture and wood carving with a German named L. Feurdermeier, who specialized in animal sculptures. The figures that Lehmann created showed the influence of expressionism in the gross design of the body, which emphasized the material from which the sculpture was made and the way the sculptor worked on it. In spite of the overall appreciation of his work, Lehmann's primary importance was as a teacher of the methods of classical sculpture, in stone and wood, to a large number of Israeli artists.

=== Canaanite to abstract, 1939–1967 ===
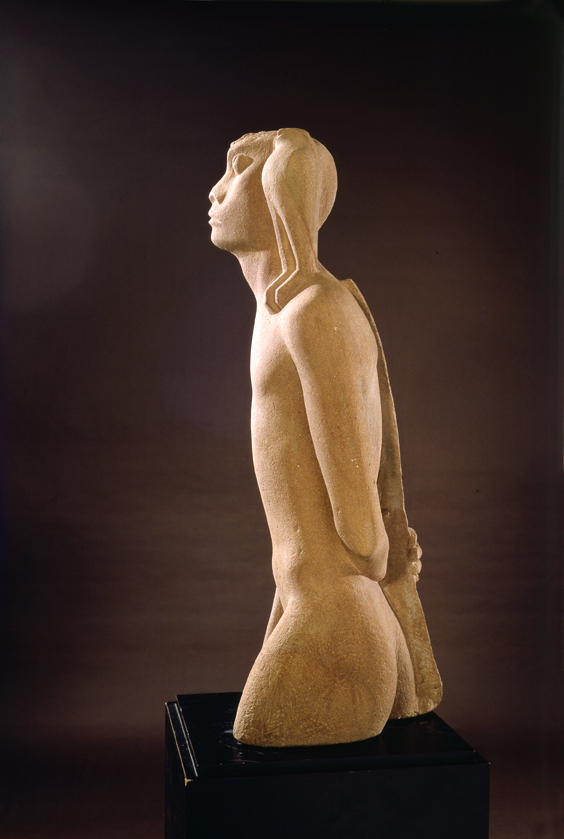
Nimrod (1939) by Itzhak Danziger

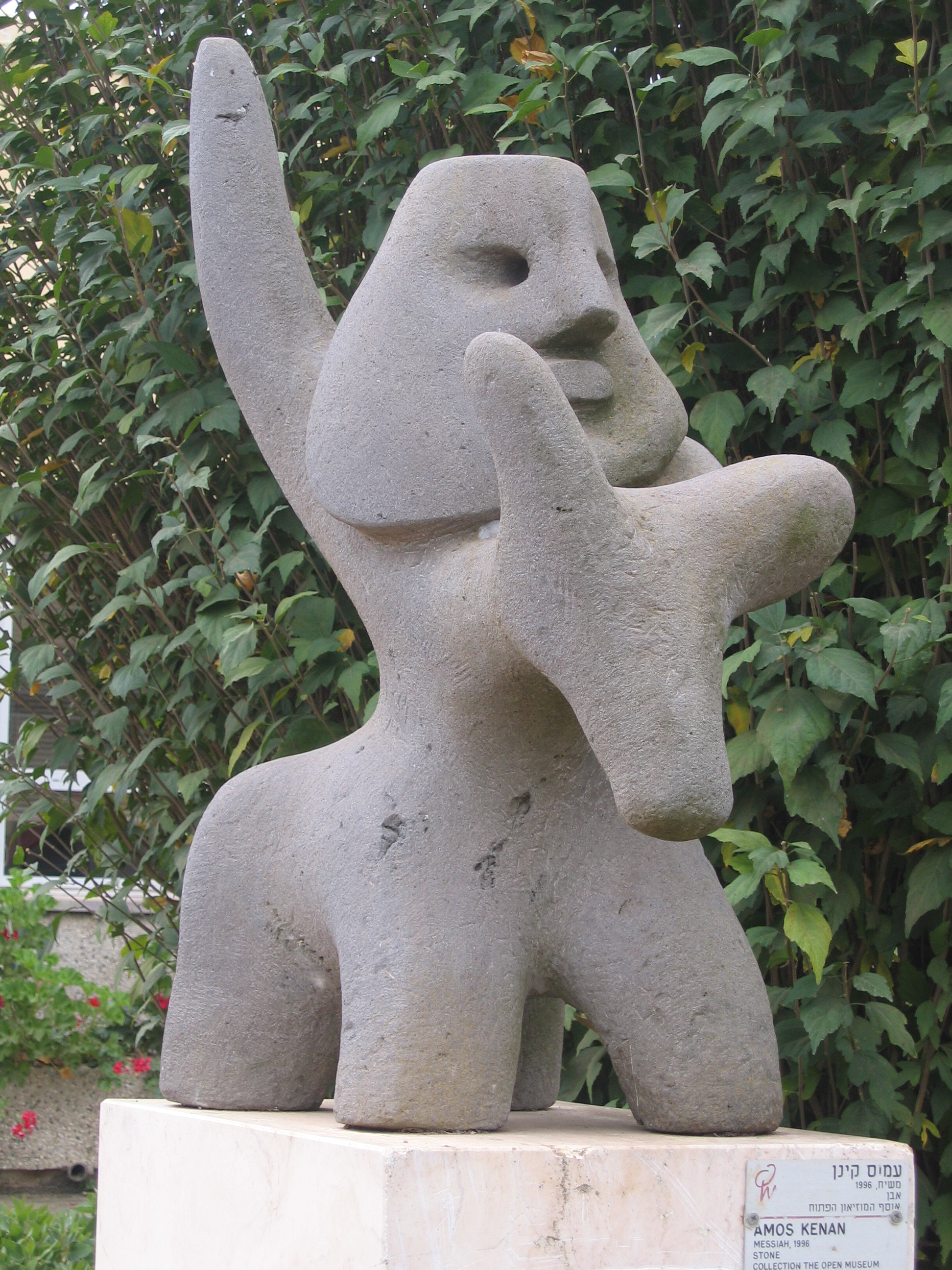
"Messiah" (1966) by Amos Kenan. Tefen Sculpture Garden

At the end of the 1930s, a group called "The Canaanites" – a broad sculptural movement, primarily literary in nature – was founded in Israel. This group tried to create a direct line between the early peoples living in the Land of Israel, in the second millennium before the Christian Era, and the Jewish people in the Land of Israel in the 20th century, at the same time striving toward the creation of a new-old culture which would separate itself from Jewish tradition. The artist most closely associated with this movement was the sculptor Itzhak Danziger, who returned to the Land of Israel in 1938 after studying art in England. The new nationalism that Danziger's "Canaanite" art suggested, a nationalism that was anti-European and full of Eastern sensuality and exoticism, reflected the attitude of many of the people living in the Jewish community in the Land of Israel. "The dream of Danziger's generation", Amos Keinan wrote after Danziger's death, was "to merge with the Land of Israel and with the land, to create a specific image with recognizable signs, something that is from here and is us, and imprint the stamp of that something special that is us on history. Aside from nationalism, the artists created sculpture which expressed a symbolic expressionism in the spirit of British sculpture of the same period.

In Tel Aviv Danziger founded a sculpture studio in the courtyard of his father's hospital, and there he critiqued and taught young sculptors such as Benjamin Tammuz, Kosso Eloul, Yechiel Shemi, Mordechai Gumpel, and others. In addition to Danziger's pupils, the studio became a gathering place for artists in other fields. In this studio Danziger created his first significant works – "Nimrod" (1939) and "Shebaziya" (1939).

From the moment it was first displayed, the statue "Nimrod" became the center of a dispute in the culture of Eretz Israel; in this sculpture Danziger presented the figure of Nimrod, the biblical hunter, as a lean youth, naked and uncircumcised, with a sword pressed close to his body, and a falcon on his shoulder. The form of the statue was reminiscent of the primitive art of the Assyrian, Egyptian, and Greek cultures, and similar in spirit to European sculpture of this period. In its form the statue displayed a unique combination of homoerotic beauty and pagan idol worship. This combination was at the center of the criticism of the religious community in the Jewish settlement. At the same time other voices declared it the model for the 'new Jewish man'. In 1942 an article appeared in the newspaper "HaBoker" declaring that "Nimrod is not just a sculpture, it is the flesh of our flesh, the spirit of our spirit. It is a milestone and a monument. It is the epitome of ingenuity and daring, of monumentality, of the youthful rebellion that characterizes an entire generation...Nimrod will be forever young."

The first showing of the sculpture in the "General Exhibition of the Young People of Eretz Israel", in Habima Theatre in May, 1942 engendered the persistent argument over the "Canaanite" movement. Because of the exhibition, Yonatan Ratosh, founder of the movement, got in touch with him and requested a meeting with him. The criticism against "Nimrod" and the Canaanites was coming not just from religious elements who, as mentioned above, protested against this representative of the pagan and the idolatrous, but also from secular critics who condemned the removal of everything "Jewish". To a large extent, "Nimrod" ended up in the middle of a dispute that had been started long before.

In spite of the fact that Danziger later expressed doubts about "Nimrod" as a model for Israeli culture, many other artists adopted the Canaanite approach to sculpture. Images of idols and figures in the "primitive" style showed up in Israeli art until the 1970s. In addition, the influence of this group can be seen to a significant degree in the work of the "New Horizons" group, most of whose members experimented with the Canaanite style early in their artistic careers.

=== "New Horizons" group ===
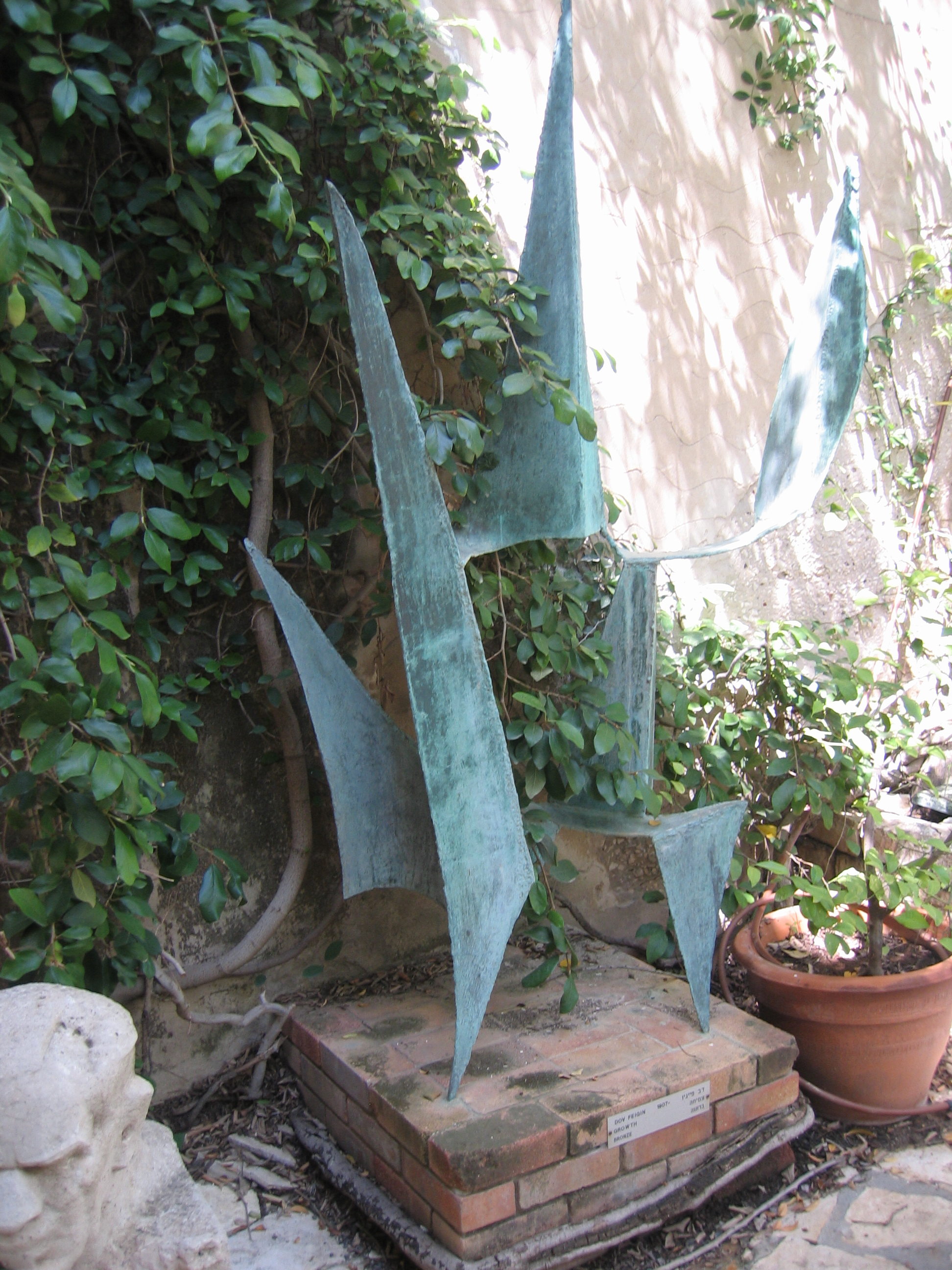
Growth (1959) by Dov Feigin. Museum of Art, Ein Harod

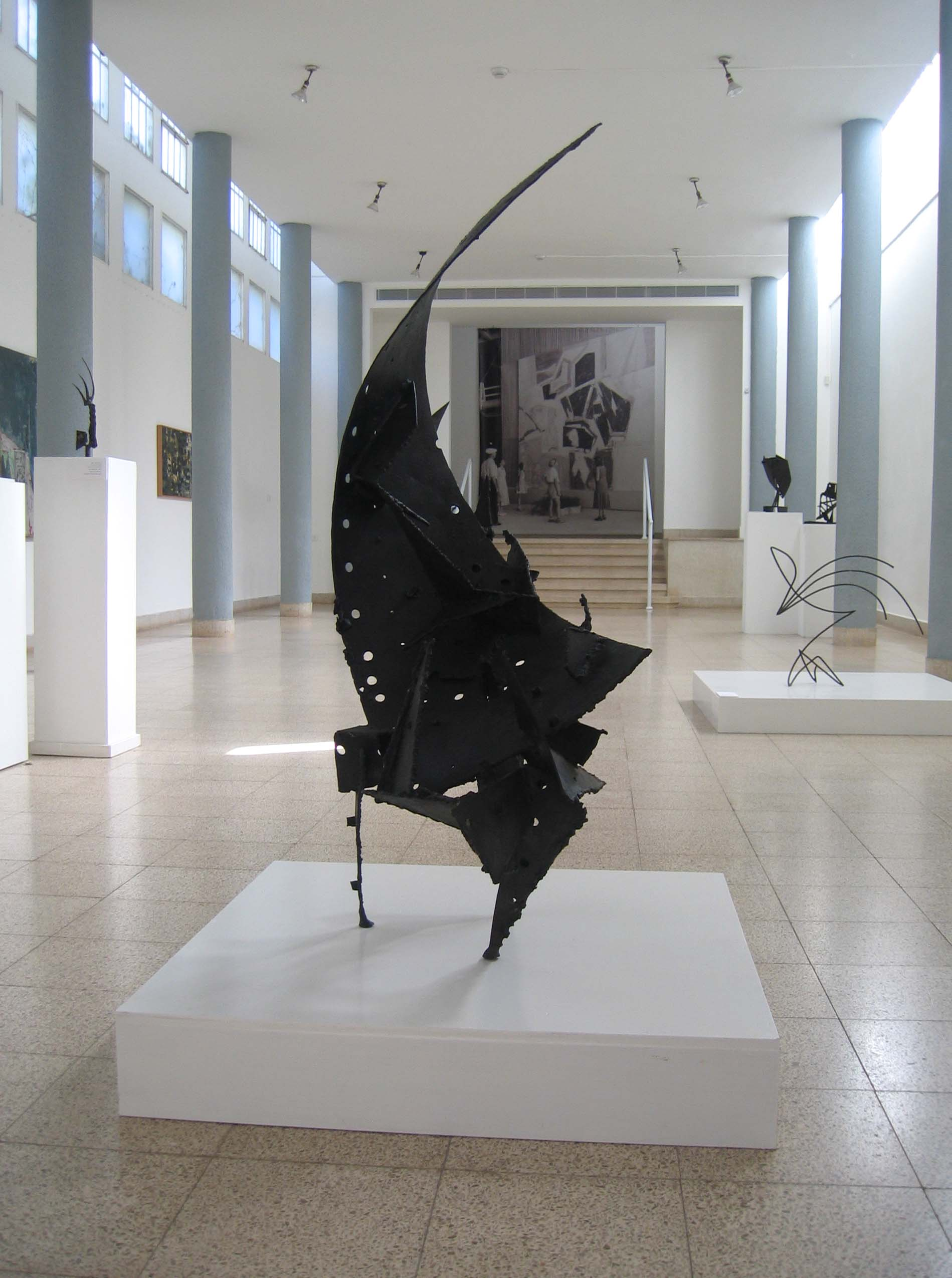
The Burning Bush (1959) by Yitzhak Danziger

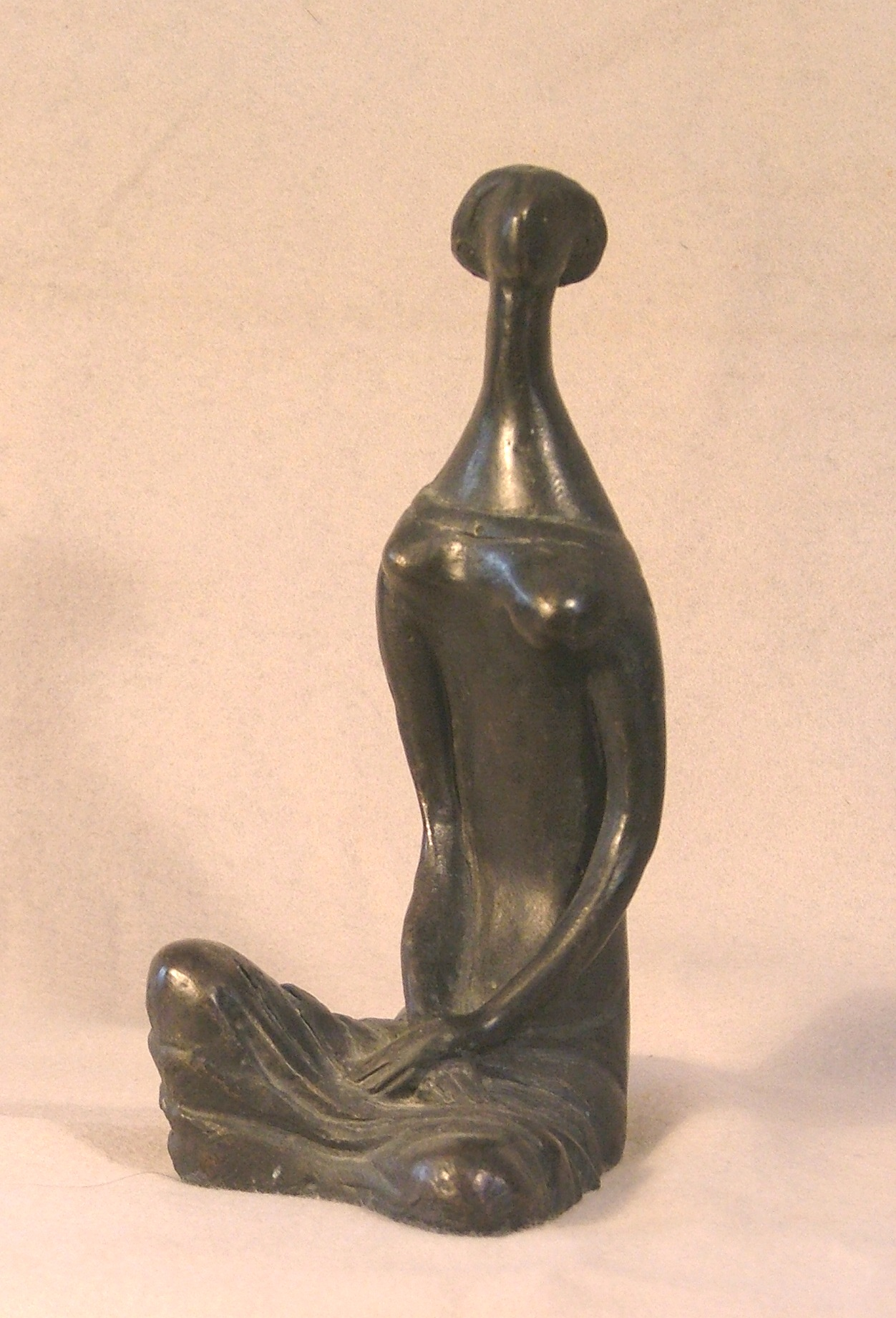
Sitting girl, Ruth Zarfati

In 1948, a movement called "New Horizons" ("Ofakim Hadashim") was founded. It identified with the values of European modernism, and particularly with abstract art. Kosso Eloul, Moshe Sternschuss, and Dov Feigin were appointed to the group of founders of the movement, and were later joined by other sculptors. The Israeli sculptors were perceived as a minority not only because of the small number of them in the movement, but primarily because of the dominance of the medium of painting in the view of the leaders of the movement, especially Joseph Zaritsky. In spite of the fact that most of the sculptures of members of the group were not "pure" abstract sculpture, they included elements of abstract art and metaphysical symbolism. Non-abstract art was perceived as old-fashioned and irrelevant. Sternschuss, for example, described the pressure that was put upon members of the group not to include figurative elements in their art. It was a long struggle that began in 1959, the year that was considered by members of the group as the year of "the victory of abstraction" and reached its peak in the mid-1960s. Sternschuss even told a story about an incident in which one of the artists wanted to display a sculpture that was considerably more avant-garde than what was generally accepted. But it had a head, and because of this, one of the members of the board testified against him on this issue.

Gideon Ofrat found a strong connection between the painting and sculpture of "New Horizons" and the art of the "Caananites." In spite of the "international" hue of the artistic forms that the members of the group exhibited, many of their works showed a mythological depiction of the Israeli landscape. In December 1962, for example, Kosso Eloul organized an international symposium on sculpture in Mitzpe Ramon. This event served as an example of the growing interest in the sculptures of the Israeli landscape, in particular in the desolate desert landscape. The landscape was perceived, on the one hand, as the basis for the thought processes for creating many monuments and memorial sculptures. Yona Fisher speculated, in his research on art in the 1960s, that the interest of sculptors in the "magic of the desert" arose not just from a romantic yearning for nature, but also from an attempt to inculcate in Israel an environment of "Culture" rather than "Civilization".

The test with regard to the works of each member of the group lay in the different way he dealt with abstraction and with landscape. The crystallization of the abstract nature of Dov Feigin's sculpture, was part of a process of an artistic search that was influenced by international sculpture, particularly that of Julio González, Constantin Brâncuși, and Alexander Calder. The most important artistic change took place in 1956, when Feigin changed over to metal (iron) sculpture. His works from this year onward, such as "Bird" and "Flight" were constructed by welding together strips of iron which were placed in compositions full of dynamism and movement. The transition from linear sculpture to planar sculpture, using cut and bent copper or iron, was a process of natural development for Feigin, who was influenced by the works of Pablo Picasso done using a similar technique.

In contrast to Feigin, Moshe Sternschuss shows a more gradual development in his move toward abstraction. After finishing his studies at Bezalel, Sternschuss went to study in Paris. In 1934 he returned to Tel Aviv and was among the founders of the Avni Institute of Art and Design. Sternschuss' sculptures during that period displayed an academic modernism, although they were lacking the Zionist features present in art of the Bezalel School. Beginning in the middle of the 1940s, his human figures displayed a marked tendency toward abstraction, as well as a growing use of geometric forms. One of the first of these sculptures was "Dance" (1944), which was displayed in an exhibition next to "Nimrod" in this year. Actually, Sternschuss' work never became completely abstract, but continued to deal with the human figure by non-figurative means.

When Itzhak Danziger returned to Israel in 1955, he joined "New Horizons" and began making metal sculptures. The style of the sculptures he developed was influenced by constructivist art, which was expressed in its abstract forms. Nonetheless, much of the subject matter of his sculptures was clearly local, as in sculptures with names associated with the Bible, such as "Horns of Hattin" (1956), the place of Saladin's victory over the crusaders in 1187, and The Burning Bush (1957), or with places in Israel, such as "Ein Gedi" (1950s), "Sheep of the Negev" (1963), etc. To a considerable extent this combination characterized the works of many of the artists of the movement.

Yechiel Shemi, also one of Danziger's pupils, moved to metal sculpture in 1955 for a practical reason. This move facilitated the move to abstraction in his work. His works, which made use of the technique of soldering, welding, and hammering into thin strips, was one of the first sculptors from this group that worked with these techniques.26 In works such as "Mythos" (1956) Shemi's connection with the "Caananite" art from which he developed can still be seen, but soon after he eliminated all identifiable signs of figurative art from his work.

Israeli-born Ruth Zarfati studied sculpture in Avni's studio with Moses Sternschuss, who became her husband. In spite of the stylistic and social closeness between Zarfati and the "New Horizons" artists, her sculpture shows overtones that are independent from the rest of the members of the group. This is expressed primarily in her display of figurative sculpture with curved lines. Her sculpture "She Sits" (1953), depicts an unidentified female figure, using lines characteristics of European expressive sculpture, such as the sculpture of Henry Moore. Another group of sculpture, "Baby Girl" (1959) shows a group of children and babies designed as dolls in grotesque expressive poses.

David Palombo (1920–1966) created powerful, abstract iron sculptures before his early death. Palombo's sculptures from the 1960s can be considered to express Holocaust memories through "the sculptural aesthetics of fire".

=== Sculpture of protest ===
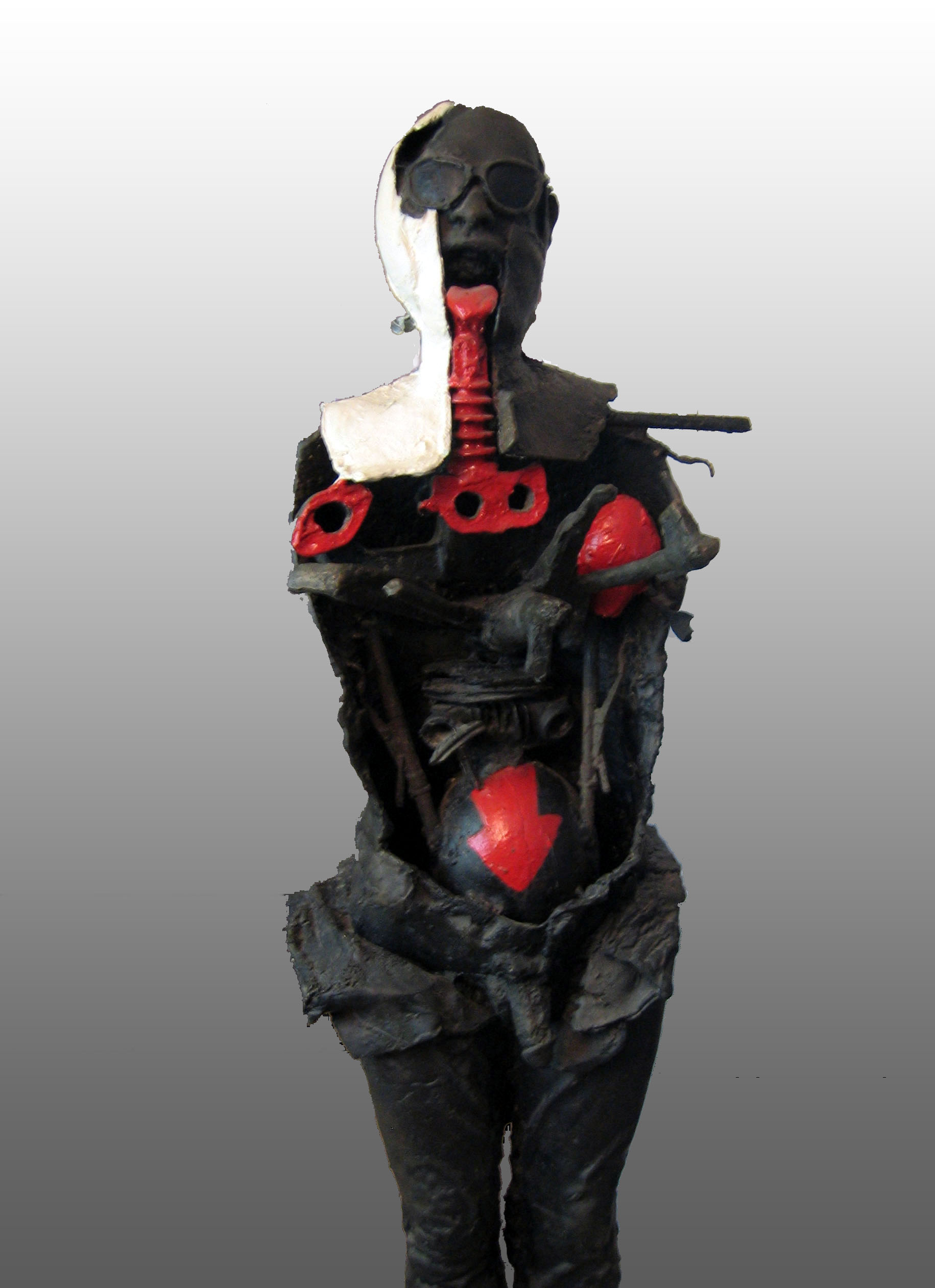
He Walked through the Fields (1967) by Yigal Tumarkin

In the early 1960s, American influences, particularly abstract expressionism, pop art, and somewhat later, conceptual art, began to appear in Israeli art. In addition to new artistic forms, pop art and conceptual art brought with them a direct connection to the political and social realities of the time. In contrast, the central trend in Israeli art was towards a preoccupation with the personal and the artistic, ignoring to a large extent a discussion of the Israeli political landscape. Artists who concerned themselves with social or Jewish issues were looked on by the artistic establishment as anarchists.

One of the first artists whose works expressed not only international artistic influences, but also the tendency to deal with current political issues, was Yigal Tumarkin, who returned to Israel in 1961, at the encouragement of Yona Fischer and Sam Dubiner, from East Berlin, where he had been the set manager of the Berliner Ensemble theater company, under the direction of Berthold Brecht. His early sculptures were created as expressive assemblages, put together from parts of various kinds of weapons. His sculpture "Take Me Under Your Wings"(1964–65), for example, Tumarkin created a sort of steel casing with rifle barrels sticking out of it. The mixture that we see in this sculpture of the nationalistic dimension and the lyric, and even erotic, dimension, was to become a striking element in Tumarkin's political art in the 1970s. A similar approach can be seen in his famous sculpture "He Walked in the Fields" (1967) (the same name as Moshe Shamir's famous story), which protested against the image of the "mythological Sabra"; Tumarkin strips off his "skin" and exposes his torn innards from which weapons and ammunition protrude and his stomach, which contains a round bomb that looks suspiciously like a uterus. During the 1970s Tumarkin's art evolved to include new materials influenced by "Land art," such as dirt, tree branches, and pieces of cloth. In this way, Tumarkin sought to sharpen the focus of his political protest against what he saw as the one-sided approach of Israeli society toward the Arab-Israeli conflict.

After the Six-Day War Israeli art began to demonstrate other expressions of protest than those of Tumarkin. At the same time, these works did not look like conventional works of sculpture, made of wood or metal. The main reason for this was the influence of various kinds of avant-garde art, which developed for the most part in the United States and influenced young Israeli artists. The spirit of this influence could be seen in a tendency toward active artistic works that blurred both the boundaries between the different fields of art and the separation of the artist from social and political life. The sculpture of this period was no longer perceived as an independent artistic object, but rather as an inherent expression of physical and social space.

In 2020, as part of the protests against Benjamin Netanyahu, Israeli artist Itay Zalait erected a 5.5-meter bronze statue entitled "Hero of Israel" at Paris Square in Jerusalem. The statue was later removed and confiscated by Jerusalem Municipality enforcers and police.

=== Landscape sculpture in conceptual art ===
Another aspect of these trends was the growing interest in the boundless Israeli landscape. These works were influenced by Land Art and a combination of the dialectical relationship between the "Israeli" landscape and the "Eastern" landscape. In many works with ritualistic and metaphysical traits, the development or direct influence of the Canaanite artists or sculptors can be seen, along with the abstraction of "New Horizons", in the various relationships with the landscape.

One of the first projects in Israel under the banner of conceptual art was carried out by Joshua Neustein. In 1970 Neustein, collaborated with Georgette Batlle and Gerry Marx on "Jerusalem River Project". For this project speakers installed across a desert valley played looped sounds of a river in East Jerusalem, in the foothills of Abu Tor and Saint Claire's Convent, and all the way to the Kidron Valley. This imaginary river not only created an extraterritorial museum atmosphere, but also hinted in an ironic way at the feeling of messianic redemption after the Six Day War, in the spirit of the Book of Ezekiel (Chapter 47) and the Book of Zechariah (Chapter 14).

Yitzhak Danziger, whose works had begun portraying the local landscape several years earlier, expressed the conceptual aspect in a style he developed as a distinctive Israeli variation of Land Art. Danziger felt that there was a need for reconciliation and improvement in the damaged relationship between man and his environment. This belief led him to plan projects which combined the rehabilitation of sites with ecology and culture. In 1971, Danziger presented his project "Hanging Nature", in a collaborative project in The Israel Museum. The work was composed of hanging fabric on which was a mixture of colors, plastic emulsion, cellulose fibers, and chemical fertilizer, on which Danziger was growing grass using a system of artificial light and irrigation. Next to the fabric, slides showing the destruction of nature by modern industrialization were screened. The exhibition requested the creation of an ecology unity, which would exist as "art" and as "nature" simultaneously. The "repair" of the landscape as an artistic event was developed by Danziger in his project "The Rehabilitation of the Nesher Quarry", on the northern slopes of Mount Carmel. This project was created as a collaboration between Danziger, Zeev Naveh the ecologist, and Joseph Morin the soil researcher. In this project, which was never finished, they attempted to create, using various technological and ecological means, a new environment among the fragments of stone left in the quarry. "Nature should not be returned to its natural state," Danziger contended. "A system needs to be found to re-use the nature which has been created as material for an entirely new concept." After the first stage of the project, the attempt at rehabilitation was put on display in 1972 in an exhibit at the Israel Museum.

In 1973 Danziger began to collect material for a book that would document his work. Within the framework of the preparation for the book, he documented places of archaeological and contemporary ritual in Israel, places which had become the sources of inspiration for his work. The book, Makom (in Hebrew - place), was published in 1982, after Danziger's death, and presented photographs of these places along with Danziger's sculptures, exercises in design, sketches of his works and ecological ideas, displayed as "sculpture" with the values of abstract art, such as collecting rainwater, etc. One of the places documented in the book is Bustan Hayat [could not confirm English spelling-sl ] at Nachal Siach in Haifa, which was built by Aziz Hayat in 1936. Within the framework of classes he gave at the Technion, Danziger conducted experiments in design with his students, involving them also with the care and upkeep of the Bustan.

In 1977 a planting ceremony was conducted in the Golan Heights for 350 Oak saplings, being planted as a memorial to the fallen soldiers of the Egoz Unit. Danziger, who was serving as a judge in "the competition for the planning and implementation of the memorial to the Northern Commando Unit," suggested that instead of a memorial sculpture, they put their emphasis on the landscape itself, and on a site that would be different from the usual memorial. ”We felt that any vertical structure, even the most impressive, could not compete with the mountain range itself. When we started climbing up to the site, we discovered that the rocks, that looked from a distance like texture, had a personality all of their own up close." This perception derived from research in Bedouin and Palestinian ritual sites in the Land of Israel, sites in which the trees serve both as a symbol next to the graves of saints and as a ritual focus, "on which they hang colorful shiny blue and green fabrics from the oaks [...] People go out to hang these fabrics because of a spiritual need, they go out to make a wish."

In 1972 group of young artists who were in touch with Danziger and influenced by his ideas created a group of activities that became known as "Metzer-Messer" in the area between Kibbutz Metzer and the Arab village Meiser in the north west section of the Shomron. Micha Ullman, with the help of youth from both the kibbutz and the village, dug a hole in each of the communities and implemented an exchange of symbolic red soil between them. Moshe Gershuni called a meeting of the kibbutz members and handed out the soil of Kibbutz Metzer to them there, and Avital Geva created in the area between the two communities an improvised library of books recycled from Amnir Recycling Industries.

Another artist influenced by Danziger's ideas was Yigal Tumarkin, who at the end of the 1970s, created a series of works entitled, "Definitions of Olive Trees and Oaks," in which he created temporary sculpture around trees. Like Danziger, Tumarkin also related in these works to the life forms of popular culture, particularly in Arab and Bedouin villages, and created from them a sort of artistic-morphological language, using "impoverished" bricolage methods. Some of the works related not only to coexistence and peace, but also to the larger Israeli political picture. In works such as "Earth Crucifixion" (1981) and "Bedouin Crucifixion" (1982), Tumarkin referred to the ejection of Palestinians and Bedouins from their lands, and created "crucifixion pillars" for these lands.

Another group that operated in a similar spirit, while at the same time emphasizing Jewish metaphysics, was the group known as the "Leviathians," presided over by Avraham Ofek, Michail Grobman, and Shmuel Ackerman. The group combined conceptual art and "land art" with Jewish symbolism. Of the three of them, Avraham Ofek had the deepest interest in sculpture and its relationship to religious symbolism and images. In one series of his works Ofek used mirrors to project Hebrew letters, words with religious or cabbalistic significance, and other images onto soil or man-made structures. In his work "Letters of Light" (1979), for example, the letters were projected onto people and fabrics and the soil of the Judean Desert. In another work Ofek screened the words "America," "Africa," and "Green card" on the walls of the Tel Hai courtyard during a symposium on sculpture.

=== Abstract sculpture ===
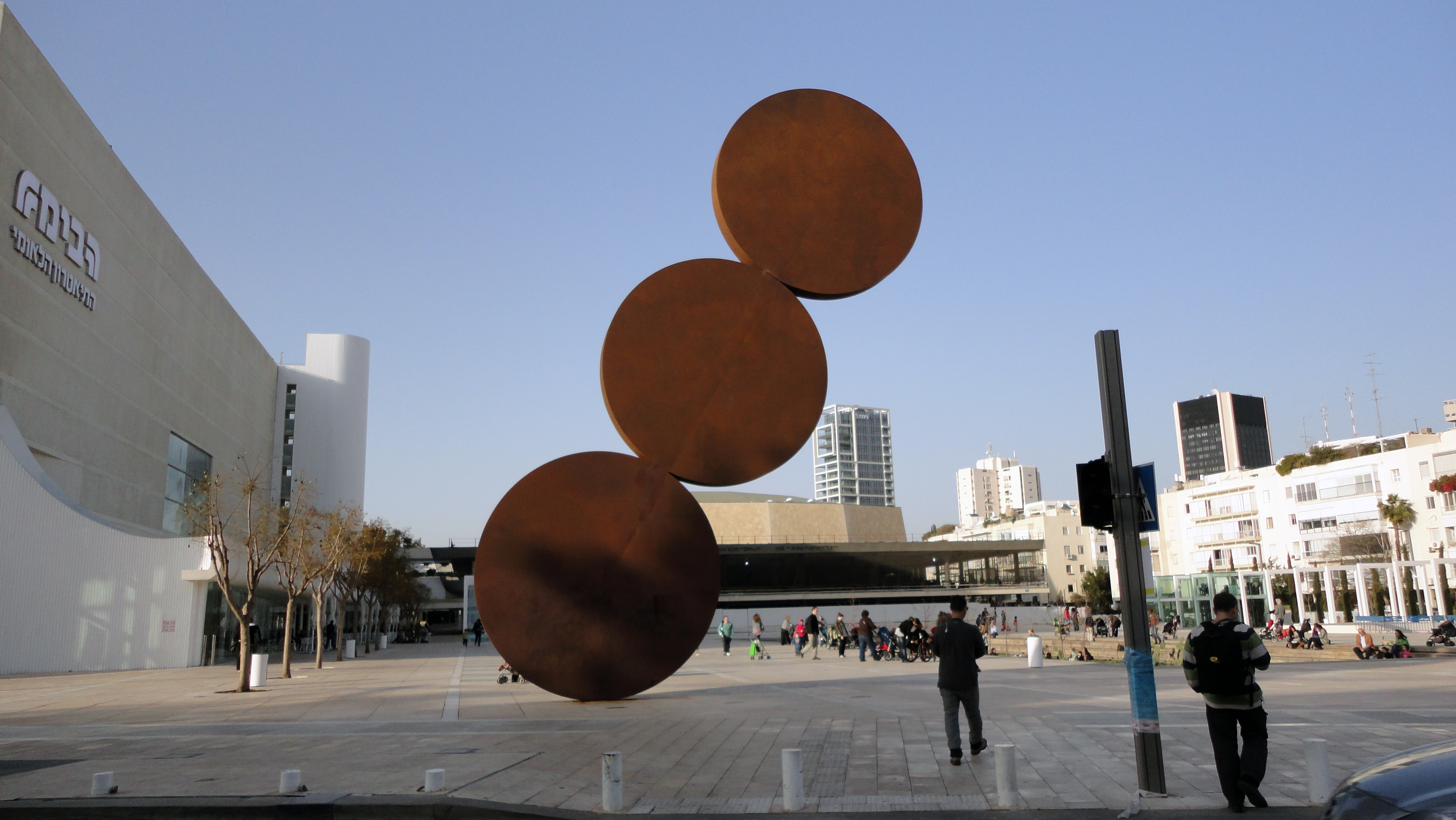
Uprise (1967–1976) by Menashe Kadishman

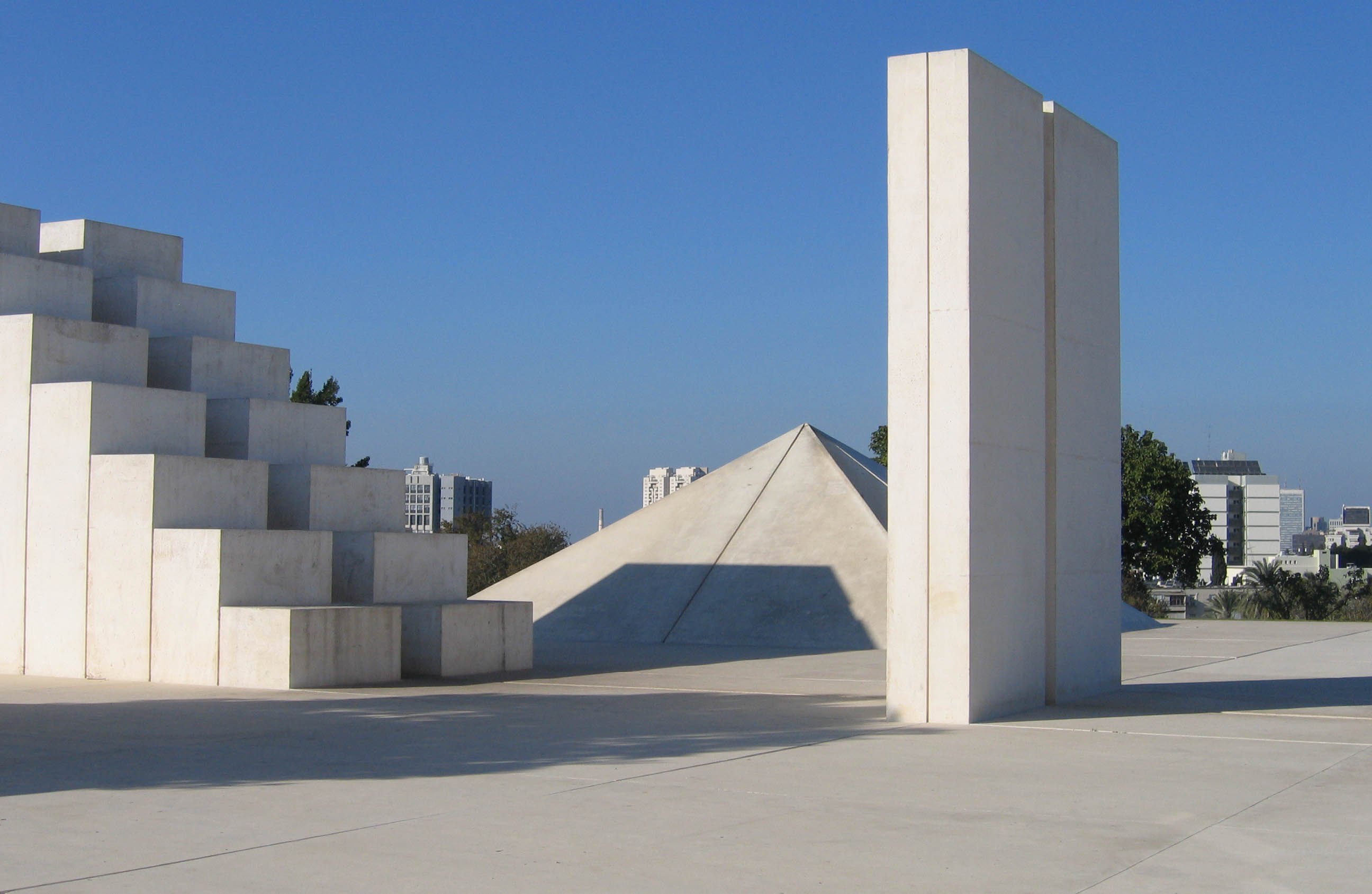
White Square (1989) by Dani Karavan

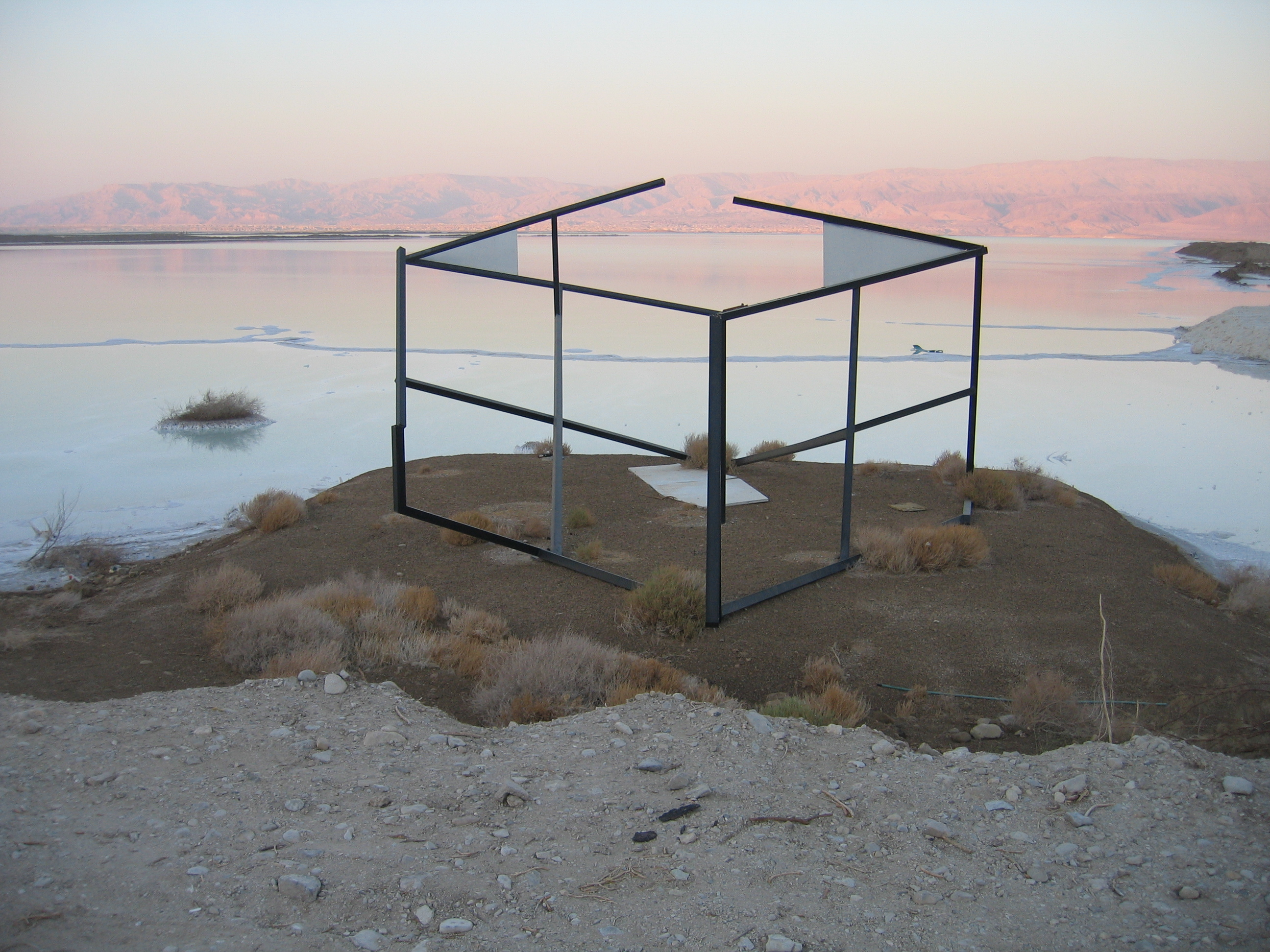
Dead Sea Sculpture (1986) by Buky Schwartz

At the beginning of the 1960s Menashe Kadishman arrived on the scene of abstract sculpture while he was studying in London. The artistic style he developed in those years was heavily influenced by English art of this period, such as the works of Anthony Caro, who was one of his teachers. At the same time his work was permeated by the relationship between landscape and ritual objects, like Danziger and other Israeli sculptors. During his stay in Europe, Kadishman created a number of totemic images of people, gates, and altars of a talismanic and primitive nature. Some of these works, such as "Suspense" (1966), or "Uprise" (1967–1976), developed into pure geometric figures.

At the end of this decade, in works such as "Aqueduct" (1968–1970) or "Segments" (1969), Kadishman combined pieces of glass separating chunks of stone with a tension of form between the different parts of the sculpture. With his return to Israel at the beginning of the 1970s, Kadishman began to create works that were clearly in the spirit of "Land Art." One of his main projects was carried out in 1972. In the framework of this project Kadishman painted a square in yellow organic paint on the land of the Monastery of the Cross, in the Valley of the Cross at the foot of the Israel Museum. The work became known as a "monument of global nature, in which the landscape depicted by it is both the subject and the object of the creative process."

Other Israeli artists also created abstract sculptures charged with symbolism. The sculptures of Michael Gross created an abstraction of the Israeli landscape, while those of Yaacov Agam contained a Jewish theological aspect. His work was also innovative in its attempt to create kinetic art. Works of his such as "18 Degrees" (1971) not only eroded the boundary between the work and the viewer of the work but also exhorted the viewer to look at the work actively.

Symbolism of a different kind can be seen in the work of Dani Karavan. The outdoor sculptures that Karavan created, from "Monument to the Negev Brigade" (1963-1968) to "White Square" (1989) utilized avant-garde European art to create a symbolic abstraction of the Israeli landscape. In Karavan's use of the techniques of modernist, and primarily brutalist, architecture, as in his museum installations, Karavan created a sort of alternative environment to landscapes, redesigning it as a utopia, or as a call for a dialogue with these landscapes.

Micha Ullman continued and developed the concept of nature and the structure of the excavations he carried out on systems of underground structures formulated according to a minimalist aesthetic. These structures, like the work "Third Watch" (1980), which are presented as defense trenches made of dirt, are also presented as the place which housed the beginning of permanent human existence.

Buky Schwartz absorbed concepts from conceptual art, primarily of the American variety, during the period that he lived in New York City. Schwartz's work dealt with the way the relationship between the viewer and the work of art is constructed and deconstructed. In the video art film "Video Structures" (1978-1980) Schwartz demonstrated the dismantling of the geometric illusion using optical methods, that is, marking an illusory form in space and then dismantling this illusion when the human body is interposed. In sculptures such as "Levitation" (1976) or "Reflection Triangle" (1980), Schwartz dismantled the serious geometry of his sculptures by inserting mirrors that produced the illusion that they were floating in the air, similarly to Kadishman's works in glass.

=== Representative sculpture of the 1970s ===
Performance art began to develop in the United States in the 1960s, trickling into Israeli art towards the end of that decade under the auspices of the "Ten Plus" group, led by Raffi Lavie and the "Third Eye" group, under the leadership of Jacques Cathmore. A large number of sculptors took advantage of the possibilities that the techniques of Performance Art opened for them with regard to a critical examination of the space around them. In spite of the fact that many works renounced the need for genuine physical expression, nevertheless the examination they carry out shows the clear way in which the artists related to physical space from the point of view of social, political, and gender issues.

Pinchas Cohen Gan during those years created a number of displays of a political nature. In his work "Touching the Border" (January 7, 1974) iron missiles, with Israeli demographic information written on them, were sent to Israel's border. The missiles were buried at the spot where the Israelis carrying them were arrested. In "Performance in a Refugees Camp in Jericho", which took place on February 10, 1974 in the northeast section of the city of Jericho near Khirbat al-Mafjar (Hisham's Palace), Cohen created a link between his personal experience as an immigrant and the experience of the Palestinian immigrant, by building a tent and a structure that looked like the sail of a boat, which was also made of fabric. At the same time, Cohen Gan set up a conversation about "Israel 25 Years Hence", in the year 2000, between two refugees, and accompanied by the declaration, "A refugee is a person who cannot return to his homeland."

Another artist, Efrat Natan, created a number of performances dealing with the dissolution of the connection between the viewer and the work of art, at the same time criticizing Israeli militarism after the Six Day War. Among her important works was "Head Sculpture," in which Natan consulted a sort of wooden sculpture which she wore as a kind of mask on her head. Natan wore the sculpture the day after the army's annual military parade in 1973, and walked with it to various central places in Tel Aviv. The form of the mask, in the shape of the letter "T," bore a resemblance to a cross or an airplane and restricted her field of vision."

A blend of political and artistic criticism with poetics can be seen in a number of paintings and installations that Moshe Gershuni created in the 1970s. For Gershuni, who began to be famous during these years as a conceptual sculptor, art and the definition of esthetics was perceived as parallel and inseparable from politics in Israel. Thus, in his work "A Gentle Hand" (1975–1978), Gershuni juxtaposed a newspaper article describing abuse of a Palestinian with a famous love song by Zalman Shneur (called: "All Her Heart She Gave Him" and the first words of which are "A gentle hand", sung to an Arab melody from the days of the Second Aliyah (1904–1914). Gershuni sang like a muezzin into a loudspeaker placed on the roof of the Tel Aviv Museum. In works like these the minimalist and conceptualist ethics served as a tool for criticizing Zionism and Israeli society.

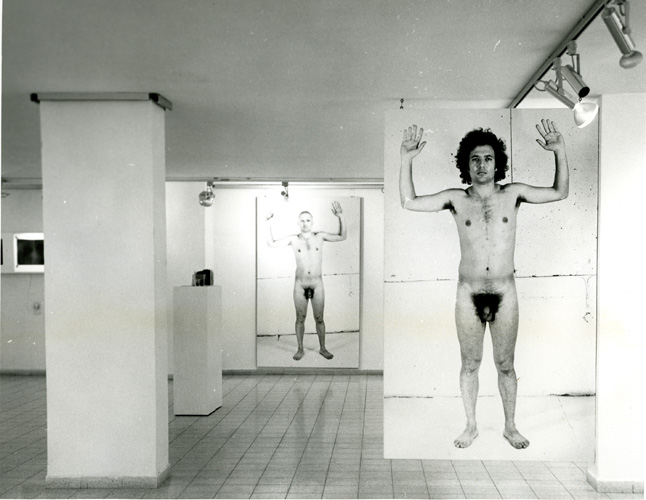
Exposure (Installation view), 1975 by Gideon Gechtman

The works of Gideon Gechtman during this period dealt with the complex relationship between art and the life of the artist, and with the dialectic between artistic representation and real life. In the exhibition "Exposure" (1975), Gechtman described the ritual of shaving his body hair in preparation for heart surgery he had undergone, and used photographed documentation like doctors' letters and x-rays which showed the artificial heart valve implanted in his body. In other works, such as "Brushes" (1974–1975), he uses hair from his head and the heads of family members and attaches it to different kinds of brushes, which he exhibits in wooden boxes, as a kind of box of ruins (a reliquary). These boxes were created according to strict minimalistic esthetic standards.

Another major work of Gechtman's during this period was exhibited in the exhibition entitled "Open Workshop" (1975) at the Israel Museum. The exhibition summarized the sociopolitical "activity" known as "Jewish Work" and, within this framework," Gechtman participated as a construction worker in the building of a new wing of the Museum and lived within the exhibition space. on the construction site. Gechtman also hung obituaries bearing the name "Jewish Work" and a photograph of the homes of Arab workers on the construction site. In spite of the clearly political aspects of this work, its complex relationship to the image of the artist in society is also evident.

== 1980s and 1990s ==
In the 1980s, influences from the international postmodern discourse began to trickle into Israeli art. Particularly important was the influence of philosophers such as Jacques Derrida and Jean Baudrillard, who formulated the concept of the semantic and relative nature of reality in their philosophical writings. The idea that the artistic representation is composed of "simulacra", objects in which the internal relation between the signifier and the signified is not direct, created a feeling that the status of the artistic object in general, and of sculpture in particular, was being undermined.

Gideon Gechtman's work expresses the transition from the conceptual approach of the 1970s to the 1980s, when new strategies were adopted that took real objects (death notices, a hospital, a child's wagon) and gradually converted them into objects of art. The real objects were recreated in various artificial materials. Death notices, for example, were made out of colored neon lights, like those used in advertisements. Other materials Gechtman used in this period were formica and imitation marble, which in themselves emphasized the artificiality of the artistic representation and its non-biographical nature.

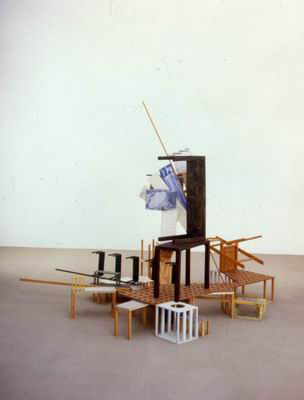
Nahum Tevet Painting Lesson, no 5, 1986 Acrylic and industrial paint on wood; found object Israel Museum collection

During the 1980s, the works of a number of sculptors were known for their use of plywood. The use of this material served to emphasize the way large-scale objects were constructed, often within the tradition of do-it-yourself carpentry. The concept behind this kind of sculpture emphasized the non-heroic nature of a work of art, related to the "Arte Povera" style, which was at the height of its influence during these years. Among the most conspicuous of the artists who first used these methods is Nahum Tevet, who began his career in the 1970s as a sculptor in the minimalist and conceptual style. While in the early 1970s he used a severe, nearly monastic, style in his works, from the beginning of the 1980s he began to construct works that were more and more complex, composed of disassembled parts, built in home-based workshops. The works are described as "a trap configuration, which seduces the eye into penetrating the content [...] but is revealed as a false temptation that blocks the way rather than leading somewhere." The group of sculptors who called themselves "Drawing Lessons," from the middle of the decade, and other works, such as "Ursa Major (with eclipse)" (1984) and "Jemmain" (1986) created a variety of points of view, disorder, and spatial disorientation, which "demonstrate the subject's loss of stability in the postmodernist world."

The sculptures of Drora Domini as well dealt with the construction and deconstruction of structures with a domestic connection. Many of them featured disassembled images of furniture. The abstract structures she built, on a relatively small scale, contained absurd connections between them. Towards the end of the decade Domini began to combine additional images in her works from compositions in the "ars poetica" style.

Another artist who created wooden structures was the sculptor Isaac Golombek. His works from the end of the decade included familiar objects reconstructed from plywood and with their natural proportions distorted. The items he produced had structures one on top of another. Itamar Levy, in his article "High Low Profile" [Rosh katan godol], describes the relationship between the viewer and Golombek's works as an experiment in the separation of the sense of sight from the senses of touching and feeling. The bodies that Golombek describes are dismantled bodies, conducting a protest dialogue against the gaze of the viewer, who aspires to determine one unique, protected, and explainable identity for the work of art. While the form of the object represents a clear identity, the way they are made distances the usefulness of the objects and disrupts the feeling of materiality of the items.

A different kind of construction can be seen in the performances of the Zik Group, which came into being in the middle of the 1980s. Within the framework of its performances, the Group built large-scale wooden sculptures and created ritualistic activities around them, combining a variety of artistic techniques. When the performance ended, they set fire to the sculpture in a public burning ceremony. In the 1990s, in addition to destruction, the group also took began to focus on the transformation of materials and did away with the public burning ceremonies.

=== Postmodern trends ===
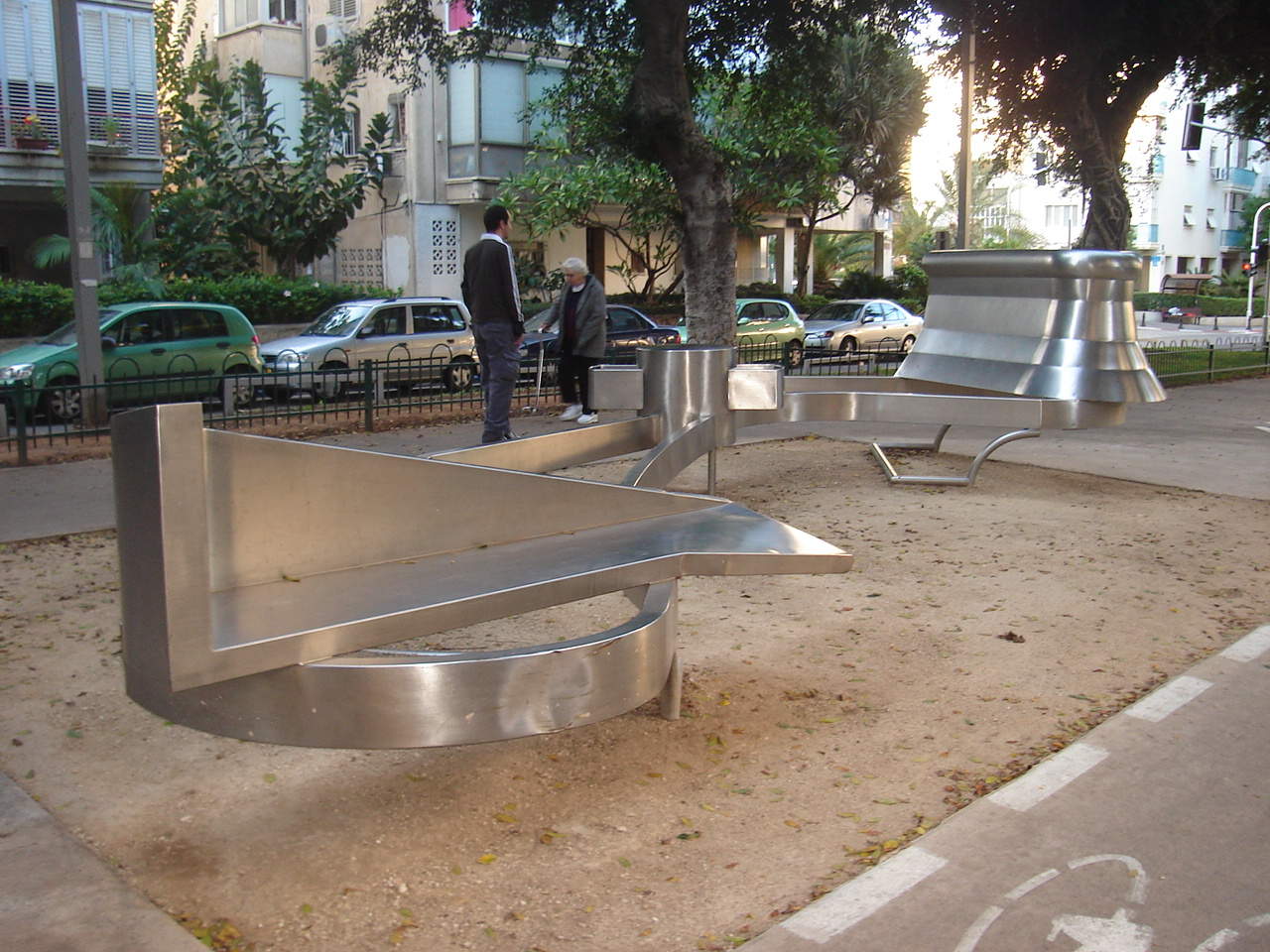
Sigal Primor Untitled, 1989 Stainless steel

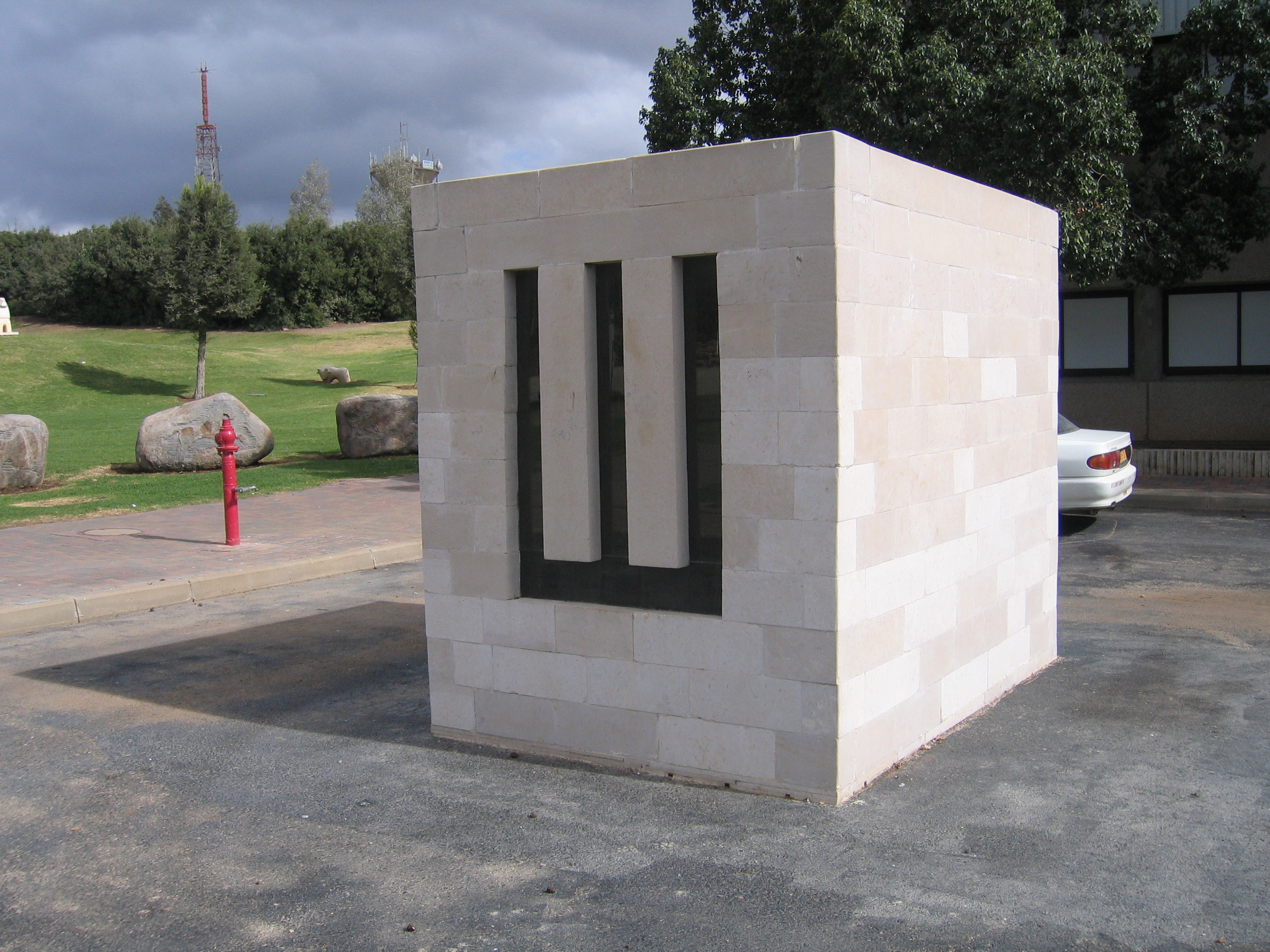
Belu-Simion Fainaru Sham (There), 1996 stone

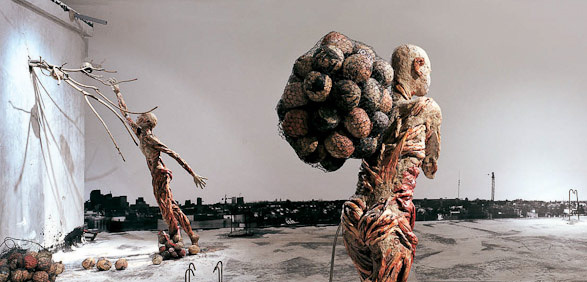
Sigalit Landau The Country (Installation view), 2002 Mixed Media

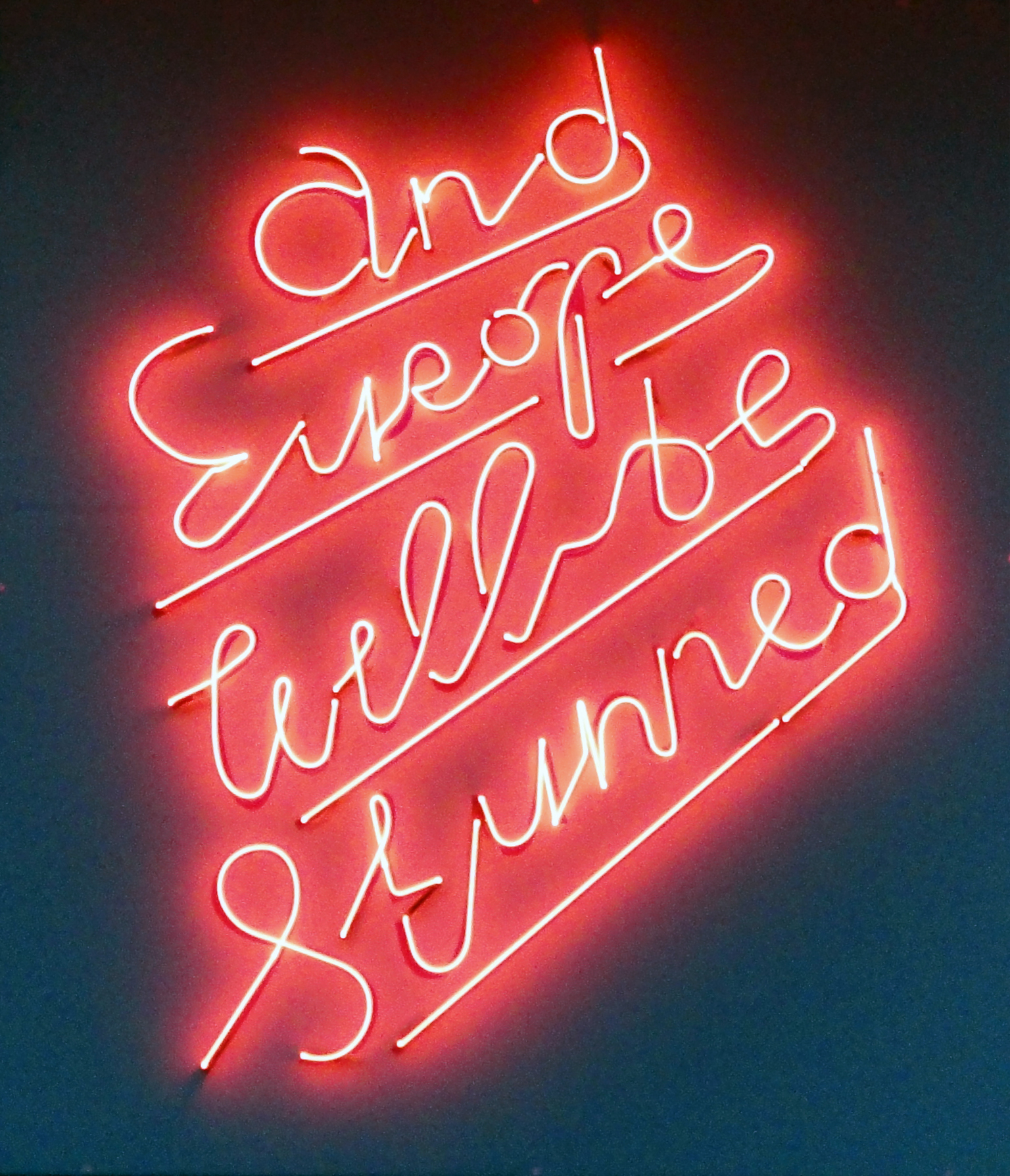
Yael Bartana...And Europe Will Be Stunned, 2012 Neon Light

Another effect of the postmodern approach was the protest against historical and cultural narratives. Art was not yet perceived as ideology, supporting or opposing the discourse on Israeli hegemony, but rather as the basis for a more open and pluralistic discussion of reality. In the era following the "political revolution" which resulted from the 1977 election, this was expressed in the establishment of the "identity discussion," in which parts of society that up to now had not usually been represented in the main Israeli discourse were included.

In the beginning of the 1980s expressions of the trauma of the Holocaust began to appear in Israeli society. In the works of the "second generation" there began to appear figures taken from World War II, combined with an attempt to establish a personal identity as an Israeli and as a Jew. Among the pioneering works were Moshe Gershuni's installation "Red Sealing/Theatre" (1980) and the works of Haim Maor. These expressions became more and more explicit in the 1990s. A large group of works was created by Igael Tumarkin, who combined in his monumental creations dialectical images representing the horrors of the Holocaust with the world of European culture in which it occurred. The artist Penny Yassour, for example, represented the Holocaust in a series of structures and models in which hints and quotes referring to the war appear. In the work "Screens" (1996), which was displayed at the "Documenta" exhibition, Yassour created a map of German trains in 1938 in the form of a table made out of rubber, as part of an experiment to present the memory and describe the relationship between private and public memory. The other materials Yassour used – metal and wood that created different architectonic spaces – produced an atmosphere of isolation and horror.

Another aspect of raising the memory of the Holocaust to the public consciousness was the focus on the immigrants who came to Israel during the first decades after the founding of the State. These attempts were accompanied by a protest against the image of the Israeli "Sabra" and an emphasis on the feeling of detachment of the immigrants. The sculptor Philip Rentzer presented, in a number of works and installations, the image of the immigrant and the refugee in Israel. His works, constructed from an assemblage of various ready-made materials, show the contrast between the permanence of the domestic and the feeling of impermanence of the immigrant. In his installation "The Box from Nes Ziona" (1998), Rentzer created an Orientalist camel carrying on its back the immigrants' shack of Rentzer's family, represented by skeletons carrying ladders.

In addition to expressions of the Holocaust, a growing expression of the motifs of Jewish art can be seen in Israeli art of the 1990s. In spite of the fact that motifs of this kind could be seen in the past in art of such artists as Arie Aroch, Moshe Castel, and Mordechai Ardon, the works of Israeli artists of the 1990s displayed a more direct relationship to the world of Jewish symbols. One of the most visible of the artists who used these motifs, Belu Simion Fainaru used Hebrew letters and other symbols as the basis for the creation of objects with metaphysical-religious significance. In his work "Sham" ("There" in Hebrew) (1996), for example, Fainaru created a closed structure, with windows in the form of the Hebrew letter Shin (ש). In another work, he made a model of a synagogue (1997), with windows in the shape of the letters, Aleph (א) to Zayin (ז) - one to seven - representing the seven days of the creation of the world.

During the 1990s we also begin to see various representations of Gender and sexual motifs. Sigal Primor exhibited works that dealt with the image of women in Western culture. In an environmental sculpture she placed on Sderot Chen in Tel Aviv-Yafo, Primor created a replica of furniture made of stainless steel. In this way, the structure points out the gap between personal, private space and public space. In many of Primor's works there is an ironic relationship to the motif of the "bride", as seen Marcel Duchamp's work, "The Glass Door". In her work "The Bride", materials such as cast iron, combined with images using other techniques such as photography, become objects of desire.

In her installation "Dinner Dress (Tales About Dora)" (1997), Tamar Raban turned a dining room table four meters in diameter into a huge crinoline and she organized an installation that took place both on top of and under the dining room table. The public was invited to participate in the meal prepared by chef Tsachi Bukshester and watch what was going on under the table on monitors placed under the transparent glass dinner plates. The installation raises questions about the perceptions of memory and personal identity in a variety of ways. During the performance, Raban would tell stories about "Dora," Raban's mother 's name, with reference to the figure "Dora" – a nickname for Ida Bauer, one of the historic patients of Sigmund Freud. In the corner of the room was the artist Pnina Reichman, embroidering words and letters in English, such as "all those lost words" and "contaminated memory," and counting in Yiddish.

The centrality of the gender discussion in the international cultural and art scene had an influence on Israeli artists. In the video art works of Hila Lulu Lin, the protest against the traditional concepts of women's sexuality stood out. In her work "No More Tears" (1994), Lulu Lin appeared passing an egg yolk back and forth between her hand and her mouth. Other artists sought not only to express in their art homoeroticism and feelings of horror and death, but also to test the social legitimacy of homosexuality and lesbianism in Israel. Among these artists the creative team of Nir Nader and Erez Harodi, and the performance artist Dan Zakheim stand out.

As the world of Israeli art was exposed to the art of the rest of the world, especially from the 1990s, a striving toward the "total visual experience," expressed in large-scale installations and in the use of theatrical technologies, particularly of video art, can be seen in the works of many Israeli artists. The subject of many of these installations is a critical test of space. Among these artists can be found Ohad Meromi and Michal Rovner, who creates video installations in which human activities are converted into ornamental designs of texts. In the works of Uri Tzaig the use of video to test the activity of the viewer as a critical activity stands out. In "Universal Square" (2006), for example, Tzaig created a video art film in which two football teams compete on a field with two balls. The change in the regular rules created a variety of opportunities for the players to come up with new plays on the space of the football field.

Another well-known artist who creates large-scale installations is Sigalit Landau. Landau creates expressive environments with multiple sculptures laden with political and social allegorical significance. The apocalyptic exhibitions Landau mounted, such as "The Country" (2002) or "Endless Solution" (2005), succeeded in reaching large and varied segments of the population.

== Commemorative sculpture ==
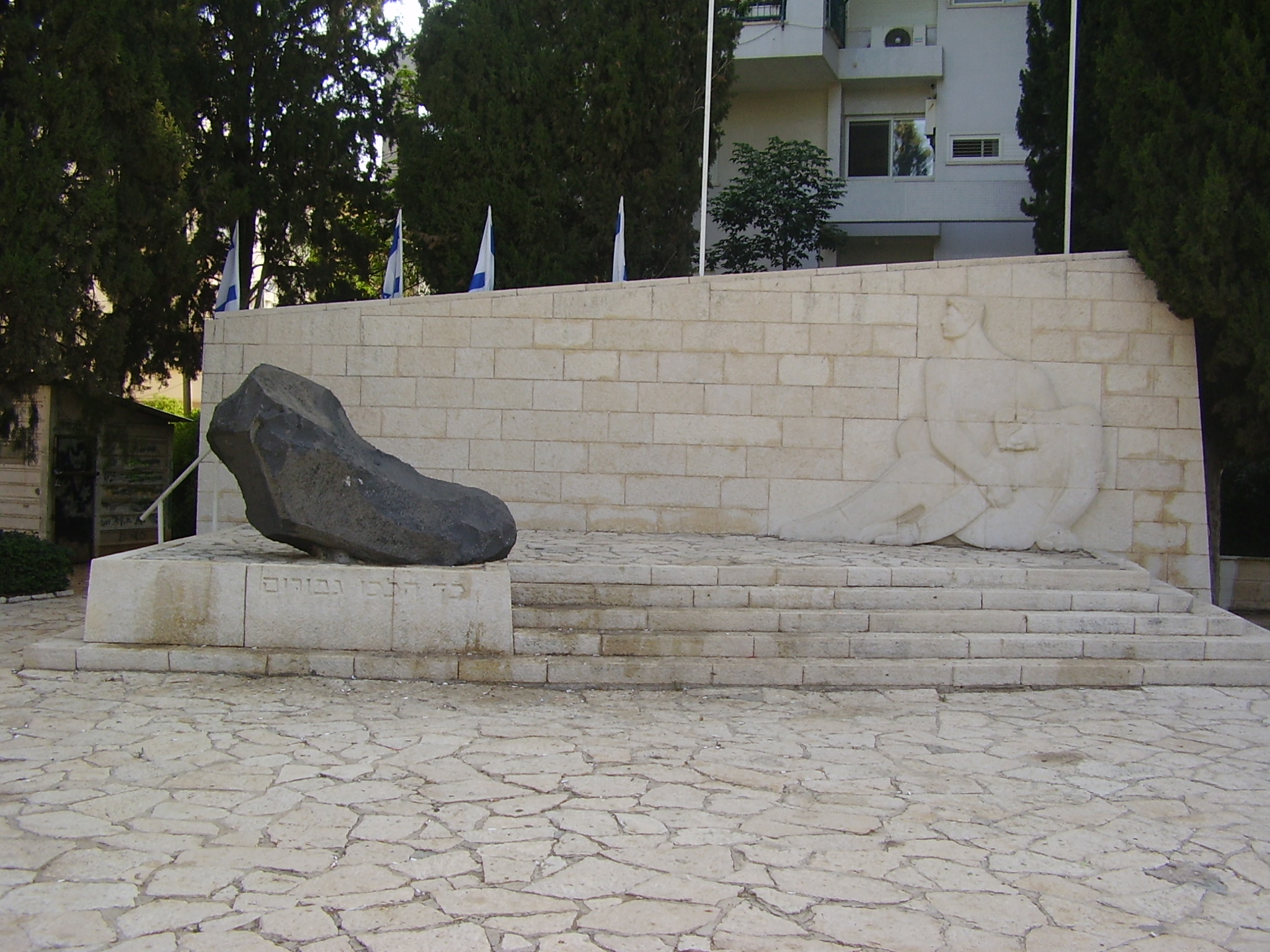
Monument for the Fallen in the War of Independence (1949) by Dov Feigin at Rehovot

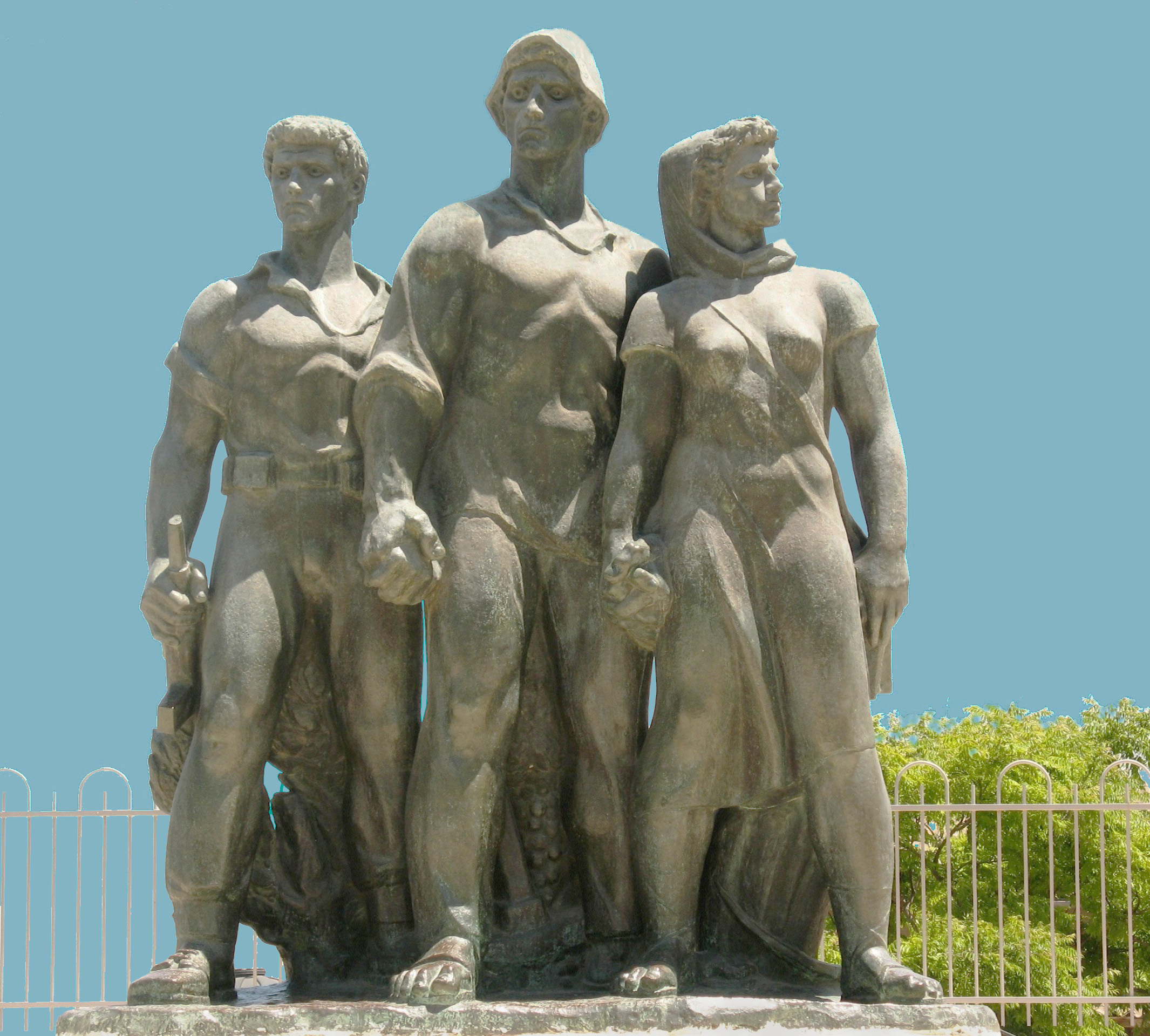
Monument at Kibbuz Negba (1953) by Natan Rapoport

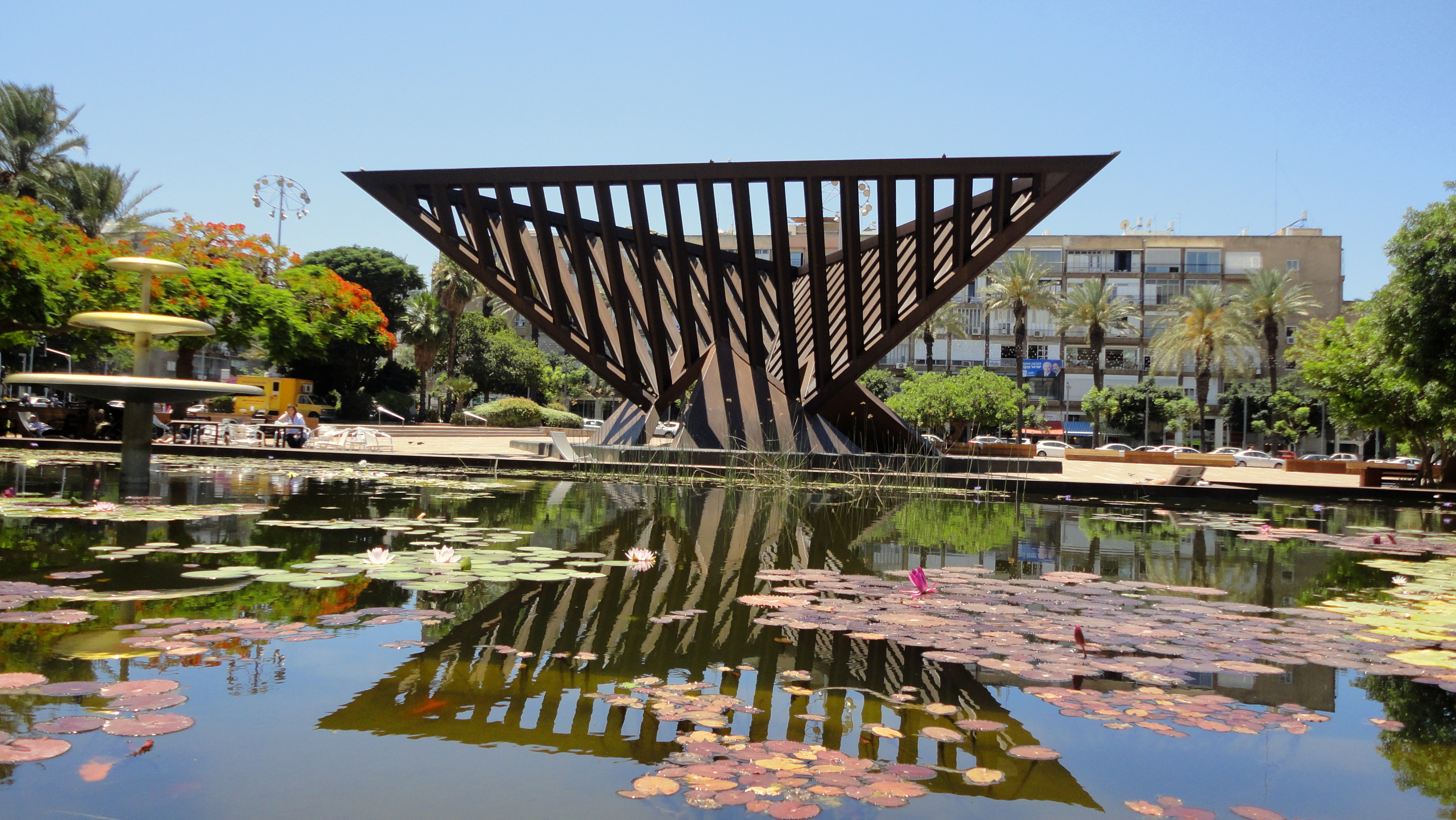
Monument to the Holocaust (1975) by Igael Tumarkin. Rabin Square, Tel Aviv-Yafo

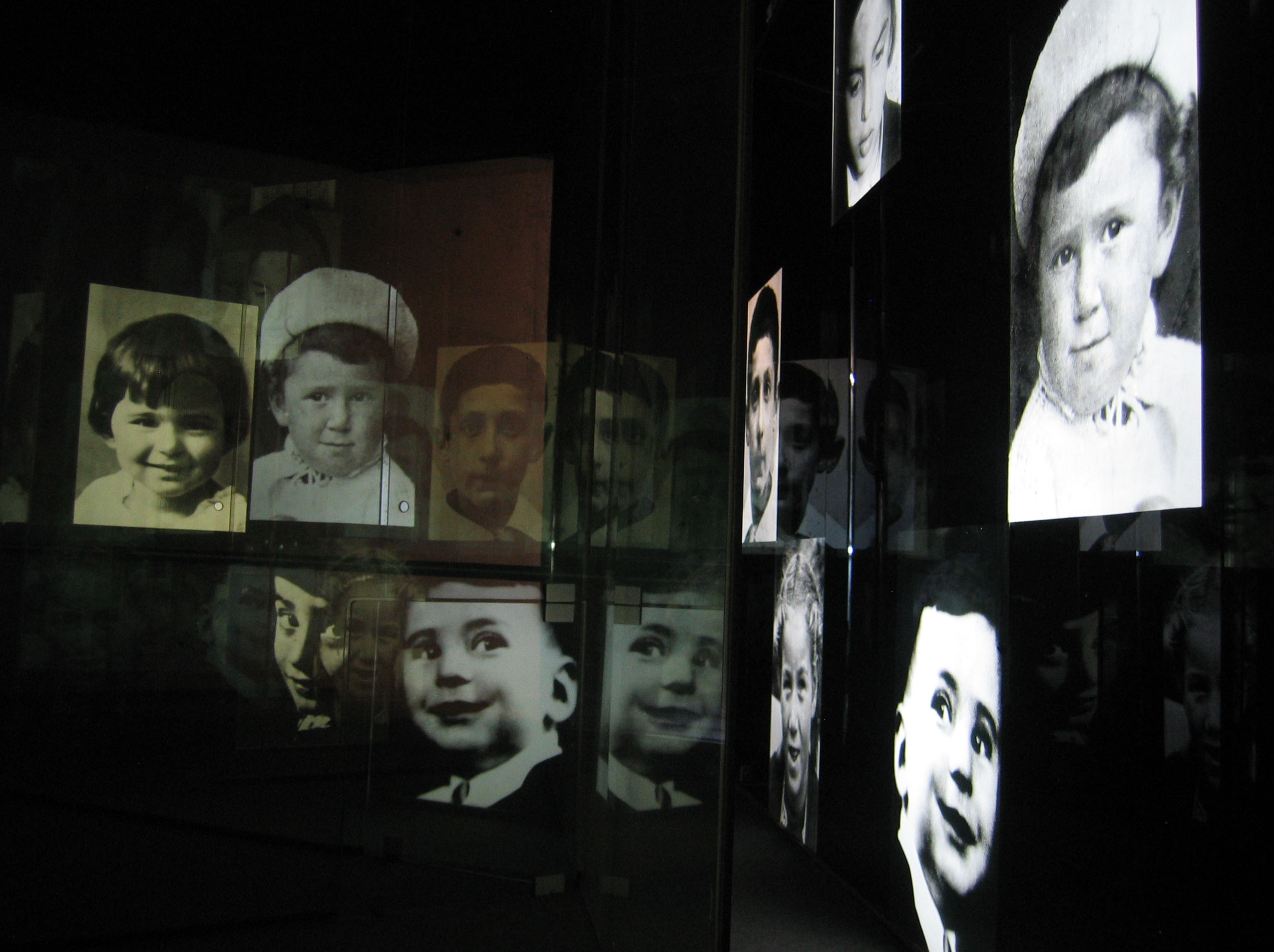
Children's Memorial (1987) by Moshe Safdie at Yad Vashem, Jerusalem

In Israel there are many memorial sculptures whose purpose is to perpetuate the memory of various events in the history of the Jewish people and the State of Israel. Since the memorial sculptures are displayed in public spaces, they tend to serve as an expression of popular art of the period. The first memorial sculpture erected in the Land of Israel was “The Roaring Lion”, which Abraham Melnikoff sculpted in Tel Hai. The large proportions of the statue and the public funding that Melnikoff recruited towards its construction, was an innovation for the small Israeli art scene. From a sculptural standpoint, the statue was connected to the beginnings of the “Caananite” movement in art.

The memorial sculptures erected in Israel up to the beginning of the 1950s, most of which were memorials for the fallen soldiers of the War of Independence, were characterized for the most part by their figurative subjects and elegiac overtones, which were aimed at the emotions of the Zionist Israeli public. The structure of the memorials was designed as spatial theater. The accepted model for the memorial included a wall with a wall covered in stone or marble, the back of which remained unused. On it, the names of the fallen soldiers were engraved. Alongside this was a relief of a wounded soldier or an allegorical description, such as descriptions of lions. A number of memorial sculptures were erected as the central structure on a ceremonial surface meant to be viewed from all sides.

In the design of these memorial sculptures we can see significant differences among the accepted patterns of memory of that period. Hashomer Hatzair (The Youth Guard) kibbutzim, for example, erected heroic memorial sculptures, such as the sculptures erected on Kibbutz Yad Mordechai (1951) or Kibbutz Negba (1953), which were expressionist attempts to emphasize the ideological and social connections between art and the presence of public expression. Within the framework of HaKibbutz Ha’Artzi intimate memorial sculptures were erected, such as the memorial sculpture “Mother and Child”, which Chana Orloff erected at Kibbutz Ein Gev (1954) or Yechiel Shemi's sculpture on Kibbutz Hasolelim (1954). These sculptures emphasized the private world of the individual and tended toward the abstract.

One of the most famous memorial sculptors during the first decades after the founding of the State of Israel was Nathan Rapoport, who immigrated to Israel in 1950, after he had already erected a memorial sculpture in the Warsaw Ghetto to the fighters of the Ghetto (1946–1948). Rapoport's many memorial sculptures, erected as memorials on government sites and on sites connected to the War of Independence, were representatives of sculptural expressionism, which took its inspiration from Neoclassicism as well. At Warsaw Ghetto Square at Yad Vashem (1971), Rapoport created a relief entitled “The Last March”, which depicts a group of Jews holding a Torah scroll. To the left of this, Rapoport erected a copy of the sculpture he created for the Warsaw Ghetto. In this way, a “Zionist narrative” of the Holocaust was created, emphasizing the heroism of the victims alongside the mourning.

In contrast to the figurative art which had characterized it earlier, from the 1950s on a growing tendency towards abstraction began to appear in memorial sculpture. At the center of the “Pilots’ Memorial" (1950s), erected by Benjamin Tammuz and Aba Elhanani in the Independence Park in Tel Aviv-Yafo, stands an image of a bird flying above a Tel Aviv seaside cliff. The tendency toward the abstract can also be seen the work by David Palombo, who created reliefs and memorial sculptures for government institutions like the Knesset and Yad Vashem, and in many other works, such as the memorial to Shlomo Ben-Yosef that Itzhak Danziger erected in Rosh Pina. However, the epitome of this trend toward avoidance of figurative images stands our starkly in the “Monument to the Negev Brigade” (1963–1968) which Dani Karavan created on the outskirts of the city of Beersheva. The monument was planned as a structure made of exposed concrete occasionally adorned with elements of metaphorical significance. The structure was an attempt to create a physical connection between itself and the desert landscape in which it stands, a connection conceptualized in the way the visitor wanders and views the landscape from within the structure. A mixture of symbolism and abstraction can be found in the “Monument to the Holocaust and National Revival”, erected in Tel Aviv's Rabin Square (then “Kings of Israel Square”). Igael Tumarkin, creator of the sculpture, used elements that created the symbolic form of an inverted pyramid made of metal, concrete, and glass. In spite of the fact that the glass is supposed to reflect what is happening in this urban space, the monument didn't express the desire for the creation of a new space which would carry on a dialogue with the landscape of the “Land of Israel”. The pyramid sits on a triangular base, painted yellow, reminiscent of the “Mark of Cain”. The two structures together form a Magen David. Tumarkin saw in this form “a prison cell that has been opened and breached. An overturned pyramid, which contains within itself, imprisoned in its base, the confined and the burdensome.” The form of the pyramid shows up in another work of the artists as well. In a late interview with him, Tumarkin confided that the pyramid can be perceived also as the gap between ideology and its enslaved results: “What have we learned since the great pyramids were built 4200 years ago?[...] Do works of forced labor and death liberate?”

In the 1990s memorial sculptures began to be built in a theatrical style, abandoning the abstract. In the “Children's Memorial” (1987), or the “Yad Vashem Train Car” (1990) by Moshe Safdie, or in the Memorial to the victims of “The Israeli Helicopter Disaster” (2008), alongside the use of symbolic forms, we see the trend towards the use of various techniques to intensify the emotional experience of the viewer.

== Characteristics ==
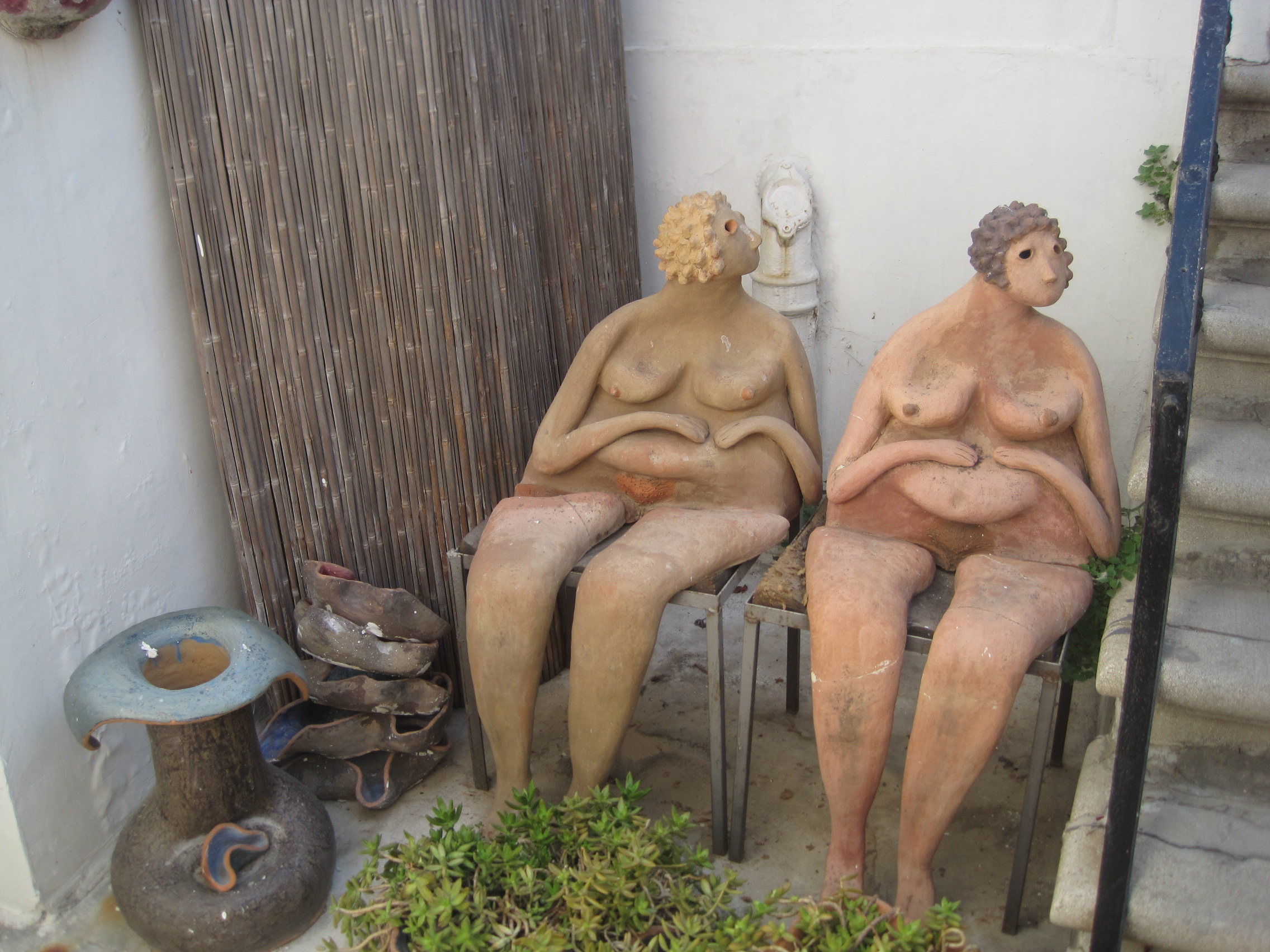
Women sculptures of Lea Majaro-Mintz

Attitudes toward the realistic depiction of the human body are complex. The birth of Israeli sculpture took place concurrently with the flowering of avantgarde and modernist European art, whose influence on sculpture from the 1930s to the present day is significant. In the 1940s the trend toward primitivism among local artists was dominant. With the appearance of “Canaanite” art we see an expression of the opposite concept of the human body, as part of the image of the landscape of “The Land of Israel.” That same desolate desert landscape became a central motif in many works of art until the 1980s. With regard to materials, we see a small amount of use of stone and marble in traditional techniques of excavation and carving, and a preference for casting and welding. This phenomenon was dominant primarily in the 1950s, as a result of the popularity of the abstract sculpture of the “New Horizons” group. In addition, this sculpture enabled artists to create art on a monumental scale, which was not common in Israeli art until then.

== See also ==
- Visual arts in Israel
- List of public art in Israel
