= Yechiel Shemi =

Israeli sculptor (1922–2003)

Yechiel Shemi יחיאל שמי
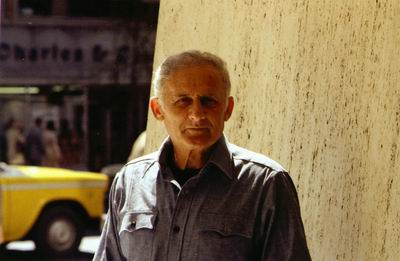
- Yechiel Shemi
- Born: 1922
- Died: October 31, 2003 (aged 80–81)
- Awards: Sandberg Award; Israel Prize for sculpture

Yechiel Shemi (Hebrew: יחיאל שמי; 1922-2003) was an Israeli sculptor. His environmental sculptures are displayed in open spaces around the country.

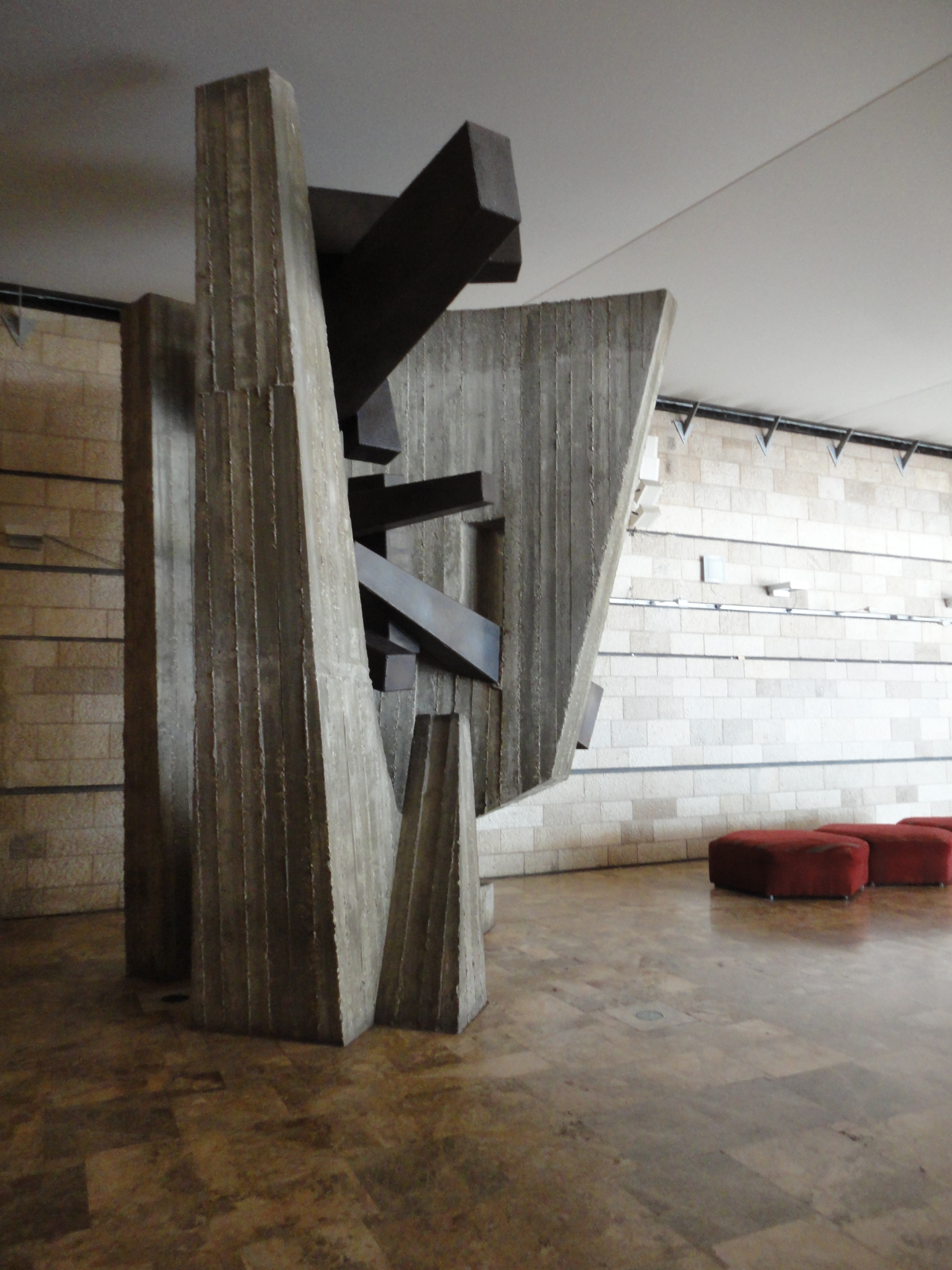
Yechiel Shemi, Jerusalem Theater

== Biography ==
Yechiel Stizberg (later Shemi), was born to Moshe and Esther Stizberg. When he was two months old the family immigrated to Mandate Palestine and settled in Haifa. At the age of 14 he joined the Mahane Avoda youth movement and began to study art with Paul Henich. In 1938, he was one of the founders of Kibbutz Beit HaArava, located north of the Dead Sea. Alongside his agricultural work, Stizberg created landscape drawings and paintings, but then moved to sculpting.

In 1942, he joined his friend Yitzhak Danziger's studio, where he painted for 3 months. In 1945, he changed his last name to Shemi and joined the HeHalutz Movement as a courier, carrying out missions in Italy, France, and Egypt. While on assignment in New York, he studied with Chaim Gross, who exposed him to modern art and art history.

During the War of Independence, Kibbutz Bet Haarava was abandoned, and all the artwork he left in the kibbutz was lost. Upon his return to Israel in 1949, he joined Kibbutz Kabri in the Galilee. In 1950-52, Shemi served as the kibbutz secretary. Influenced by Avigdor Stematsky and Joseph Zaritsky, he became a member of the New Horizons Group in 1952. In 1966, Shemi moved to Kibbutz Gadot for half a year.

== Art career ==
In 1959-1961, Shemi studied art in Paris. In 1977-1979, he taught sculpting and lectured on environmental sculpture at Oranim Teachers College. He also taught at the Technion in Haifa and the Ein Hod artist's colony. Shemi was a member of New Horizons group. In the mid-1950s, Shemi's artwork changed drastically; one of the changes he made was changing his material for his sculptures from wood and stone to metal materials. His first metal bird sculpture was made in 1955. During the years 1955-1957, Shemi created a series of sculptures of abstract figures of animals and humans. A few of these sculptures were exhibited in the seventh exhibition of New Horizons that opened in 1957 at the Independence Hall (Israel). Exhibiting some 30 sculptures by Shemi. During 1957-1956, Shemi created the sculpture group "Nest".

In 1962, Shemi began to create expressive works from scrap metal. During the 1960s, he showed his assemblage sculpture in solo exhibitions at Centre for Fine Arts, Brussels in 1964. Shemi had additional solo exhibitions at the Tel Aviv Museum of Art in 1966 and at the Israel Museum in 1967. He also created two large public sculptures.

In the late 1960s and throughout the 1970s, Shemi changed his technique. Instead of using ready-made objects, he reduced his art to geometric shapes. In 1995, a retrospective exhibit was held at the Tefen Sculpture Garden.

In 198,1 Shemi was awarded the Sandberg Prize from the Israel Museum. In 1986, the Israel Prize for sculpture, together with Batia Lishansky. In 1988 Adam Baruch published the book "Yehiel Shemi: Sculptures" and a solo exhibit was help in the Ramat Gan Museum of Art.

== Awards and recognition ==
After a show in the United States in the 1960s, the Museum of Modern Art acquired his work. Shemi was the first Israeli artist to have his work purchased by the MoMA.

Shemi won the Sandberg Prize in 1981 and the Israel Prize for sculpture in 1986. In 1966 and 1997, the Tel Aviv Museum of Art mounted exhibitions of his work.

In 1997 a retrospective exhibit of his works was held at the Tel Aviv Museum of Art with a biographical catalog by Michael Sgan-Cohen. In 1998 the "Yehiel Shemi Papers" was published by the author Agassi, based on a series of conversations with Shemi.

- 1954 Dizengoff Prize for Painting and Sculpture, Municipality of Tel Aviv-Yafo
- 1966 Milo Club Prize
- 1981 Sandberg Prize for Israeli Art, Israel Museum, Jerusalem
- 1986 Israel Prize for Lifetime Achievement in Sculpture
- 2000 The Mendel and Eva Pundik Foundation Prize for an Israeli Artist, Tel Aviv Museum of Art, Tel Aviv

== Education ==
- 1937-38 Reali High School, Haifa
- 1959-1961 advanced studies, Paris, France
- 1941 Advanced studies in sculpture with Itzhak Danziger, Tel Aviv
- 1940s Studied sculpture with Chaim Gross, New York

== Teaching ==
- 1977-79 Oranim Art Institute, Tivon, sculpture and environmental sculpture
- 1977-78 Art School, Ein Hod, sculpture
- 1977-79 Technion, Haifa, Lecturer on environmental design

== See also ==
- Visual arts in Israel
- Israeli sculpture
- List of public art in Israel
- Culture of Israel
- Shemi Sabag (born 1959), Israeli Olympic marathon runner
