= Jacob Brandenburg =

Israeli sculptor

Jacob Brandenburg יעקב ברנדנבורג
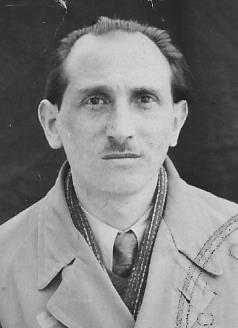
- Born: 1899; Stawiski, Poland
- Died: 1981 (aged 81–82); Jerusalem, Israel
- Known for: Sculpture

Jacob Brandenburg (Hebrew: יעקב ברנדנבורג; 1899- December 2, 1981) was a Polish-born Israeli sculptor.

== Biography ==
Jacob Brandenburg was born in Stawiski, Poland. He and his sister Rachel were orphaned in early childhood. He was sent to study at Łomża Yeshiva. He planned to seek rabbinical ordination, but was forced to leave due to ill health. In 1920, Brandenburg moved to Germany and enrolled at the Berlin School of Art in Charlottenburg. He studied under Hugo Lederer and Hermann Struck. In 1934, he immigrated to Palestine. He settled in Jerusalem, where he worked as a stonemason and taught art.

Brandenburg was married to Tehila, a children's nurse. They had no children of their own.

== Art career ==
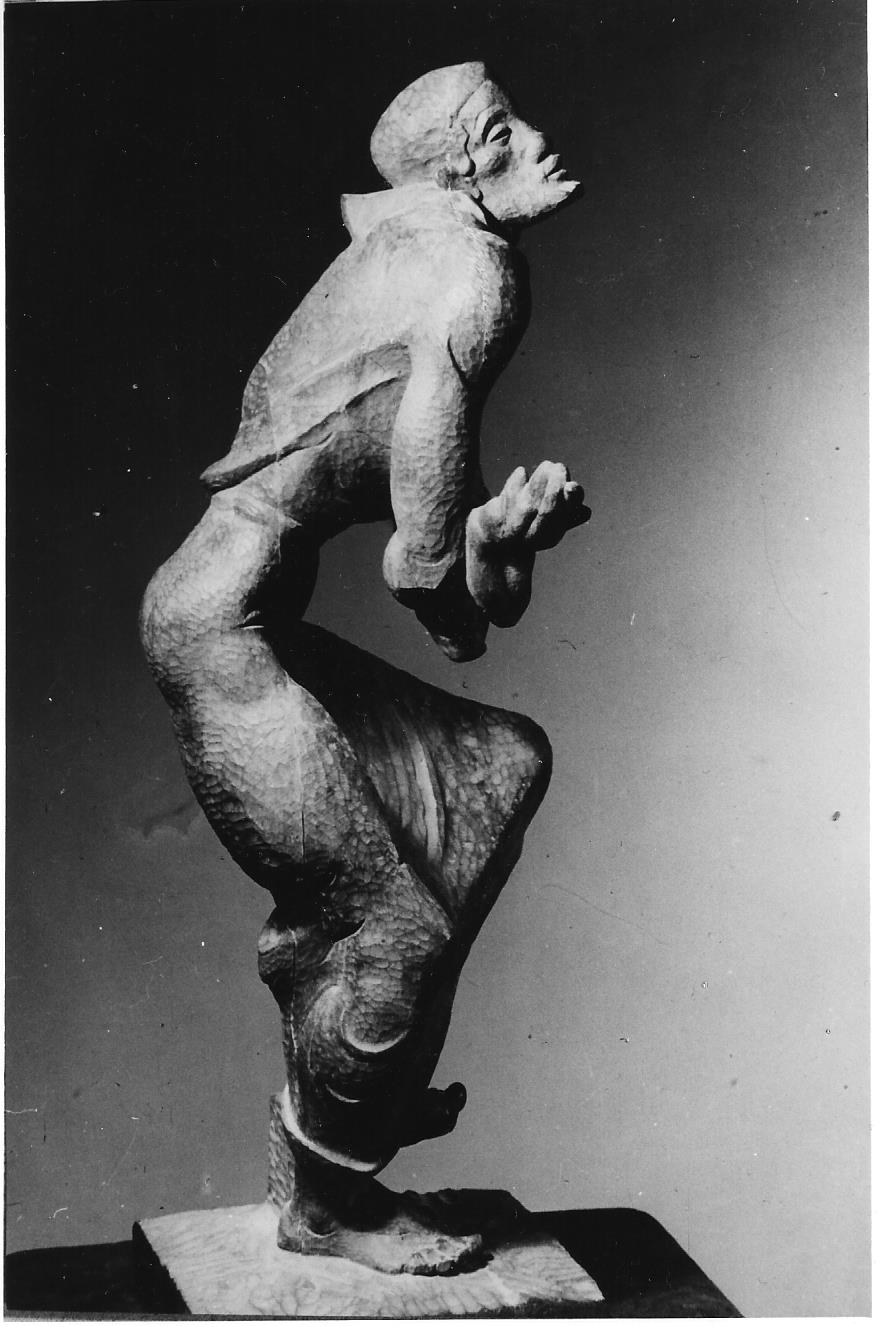
Ecstasy by Jacob Brandenburg, wood

Brandenburg sculpted in wood, stone, clay and plaster, and was inspired by German expressionism. Biblical themes and animals were major motifs in his work.

His first major work in Berlin was a life-sized head of the Biblical prophet Jeremiah.

Israeli art critic Gideon Ofrat wrote about Brandenburg's wooden lion in the collection of Haifa University, describing it “old and tired,” compared to Melnikov’s roaring lion at Tel Hai. Brandenburg’s lion is “more spiritual and more human, but stooped and melancholy. It is the Lion of Judah lamenting two thousand years of suffering and exile, and above all, the Holocaust.

Brandenburg's sculpture "Thinker" was described by Palestine Post art critic Thomas Meysels as "an accomplished work combining a Barlach ceniure of body with a Michelangelesque head."

A review of Brandenburg's "Ecstasy," carved from wood, describes it as a mature work that moves between expressionism and realism, with the sculptor freeing the figure from the weight of corporeal being and allowing it to soar to emotional heights.

== Awards and recognition ==
In 1940, Brandenburg won the Dizengoff Prize. In 1966, he published a book about his biblical-themed art, The Bible in Sculpture and Painting.

== See also ==
- Israeli sculpture
- Visual arts in Israel
