= Belu-Simion Fainaru =

Israeli sculptor

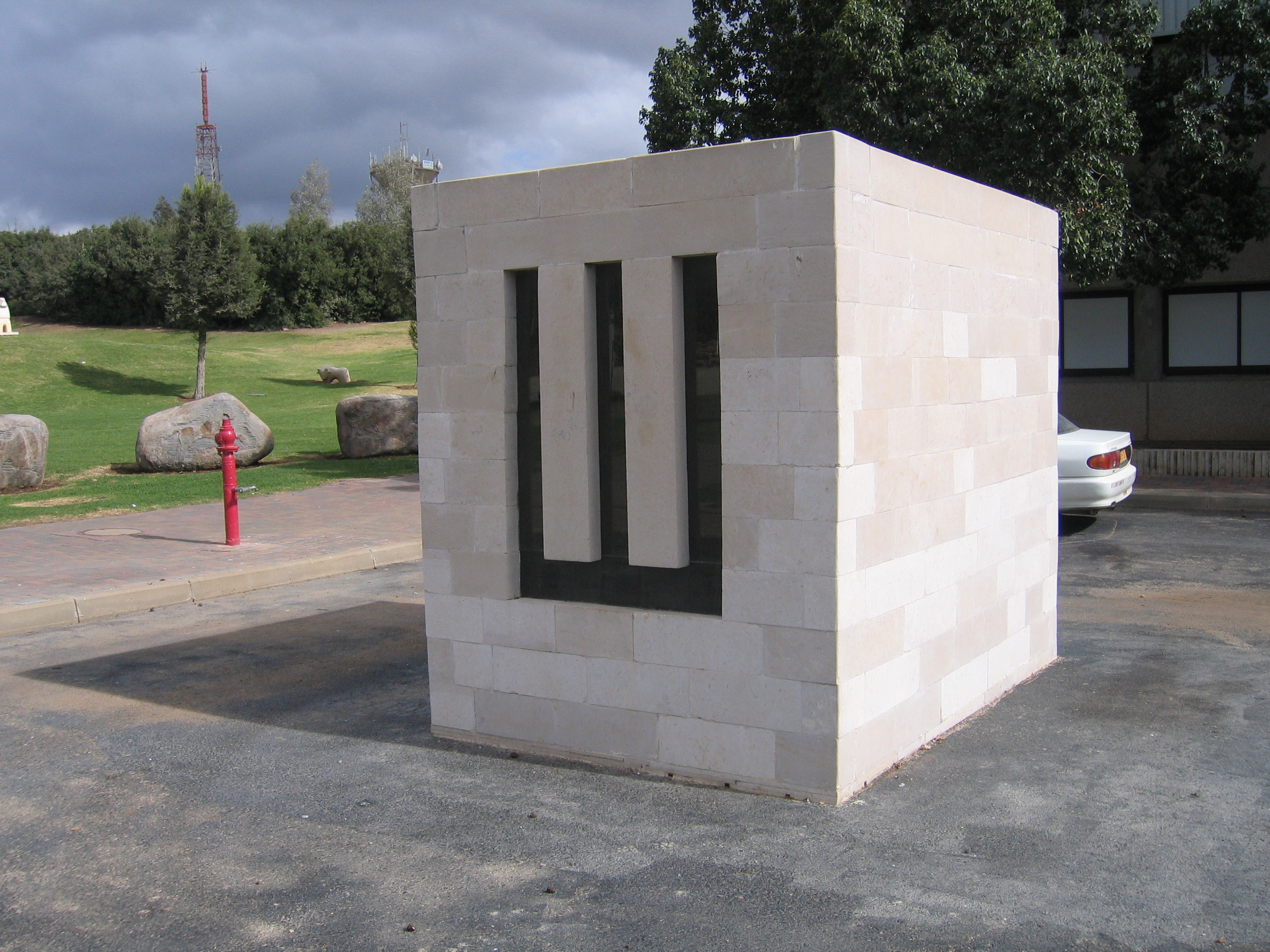
Sham ("There"), 1996, stone, glass, iron, earth. Tefen Open Museum, Tefen Industrial Park. Hebrew wordplay of Sham/Shem (There/Name)

Belu-Simion Fainaru (Hebrew: בלו-סימיון פאינארו; born 1959) is an Israeli sculptor who was born in Bucharest, Romania and immigrated to Israel in 1973. He studied at the University of Haifa from 1980 to 1983 and earned an MA from the University of Chicago in 1984. He continued his art education at the Domus Academy, Postgraduate School of Design in Milan, Italy and at The Royal Academies for Science and the Arts of Belgium in Brussels. Fainaru lives and works in Haifa, Israel and in Antwerp, Belgium.

Much of Fainaru's work deals with Jewish history, Jewish rituals, and Jewish literature.

Fainaru was chosen as the recipient of the Israel Prize for interdisciplinary design and art for the year 2025.

== Biography ==
Belu Simion Fainaru, an Israeli sculptor and installation artist, was born in Bucharest, Romania in 1959 and in 1973 moved to Israel. During the 1980s, his work used motifs taken from Jewish culture, through which he raised questions of identity and historical memory. In his works, Fainaru created concretization of metaphysical concepts such as "light" or "name", into artistic objects that make use of the text.

Detachment, social issues and characters from the margins of Israeli society, are typical in many of Fainaru works. In the exhibit "The homeless" (1999), for example, Fainaru created a temporary living environment for the homeless in the art exhibition space. Fainaru also works as a curator. In 1993 he was the co-founder of the Pyramid organization in Haifa and in 2010 was one of the initiators and curators of "The Mediterranean Biennale".

Belu Simion Fainaru lives and works in Haifa.

== Education ==
He attended Haifa University from 1980 to 1983 and obtained his MA in art from the University of Chicago in 1984. He also attended the Domus Academy in Milan and the Royal Academy of the Arts in Brussels.

== Awards ==
- 1985 Young Artist Award, Haifa Art Foundation, Haifa
- 1987 Study scholarship from the Italian Government, Italy
- 1989 Training Fellowship of the Belgian government, Belgium
- 1991 Prize for a Young Artist, Ministry of Education
- 1992 Sculpture Competition, Levi and Fortuna Askenazi Sculpture Garden, Tel Aviv University, First prize
- 1994 The Nahum Gutman Prize for Painting and Sculpture, The Histadrut Labor Federation
- 1997 George and Janet Jaffin Prize for Excellence in Plastic Arts, America-Israel Cultural Foundation
- 2000 Aptowitzer Foundation Award for Distinguished Achievement in Contemporary Creative Arts, Haifa Museum of Art

== See also ==
- List of public art in Israel for more of his publicly displayed works

== Other sources ==
- Brockhaus, Christoph, Kulturräume, Skulptur seit 1970, Joseph Beuys, Belu-Simion Fainaru, Lutz Fritsch, Palle Seiersen Frost, Dani Karavan, Köln, DuMont, 1999, ISBN 3-7701-5048-1.
- "Belu-Simion Fainaru". Information Center for Israeli Art. Israel Museum.
- Website Belu-Simion Fainaru
- The Mediterranean Biennale, "Belu-Simion Fainaru"
