= List of public art in Israel =

This is a list of public art in Israel.

This list applies only to works of public art accessible in an outdoor public space. For example, this does not include artwork visible inside a museum.

== Jerusalem District ==
=== Jerusalem ===
Artist	Title, Year	Description	Address	Coordinates	ID	Image
Ze'ev Raban	Brass Doors of Bezalel, 1922	זאב רבן, 1922 בית האמנים, רחוב שמואל הנגיד 12, ירושלים	Jerusalem	coordinates missing	480783	
Ze'ev Raban	Picture Frame, 1928	זאב רבן, 1928 בית האמנים, רחוב שמואל הנגיד 12, ירושלים	Artist House, Shmuel Hanagid St, Jerusalem	coordinates missing	480344	
Ze'ev Raban	Doors of Bikur Holim Hospital, Jerusalem, 1922	זאב רבן, 1922 בית החולים ביקור חולים, רחוב הנביאים 74, ירושלים	Bikur Holim Hospital, 74 Haneviim St., Jerusalem, Jerusalem	31.78384, 35.21783	480345	
Avraham Ofek	Mural, 1973	אברהם אופק ציור קיר, 1973 בית ספר אגרון, זנגוויל 29, קריית היובל, ירושלים	Agron School, Jerusalem	31.762900, 35.177349	465281	
Avigdor Arikha	Mosaic	אביגדור אריכא ללא כותרת, בית החייל, רחוב שאלתיאל דוד 3, ירושלים	Beit Hahayal, Jerusalem	coordinates missing	464401	
Micha Ullman	Ben Hinnom Valley, 1984	מיכה אולמן גיא בן הינום, 1984 ירושלים	Ben Hinnom Valley, Jerusalem	coordinates missing	464667	
Batia Lishansky	Silver Platter, 1960	בתיה לישנסקי מגש הכסף, ברונזה, 1960 מכון בן צבי, אברבנאל 12, רחביה, ירושלים הכניסה דרך אבן גבירול 14	Ben Zvi Institute, Jerusalem	coordinates missing	465091	
Yechiel Shemi	Sculpture, 1958	יחיאל שמי, 1958 ירושלים, בנייני האומה	Binyanei Hauma, Jerusalem	31.78652, 35.2026	467724	
Moshe Castel	And the Peoples Shall Stream Towards It	משה קסטל ונהרו עליו עמים, שני ציורי קיר, ירושלים, טרקלין קסטל, מלון היאט רג'נסי	Castel Lounge, Hyatt Regency Hotel, Jerusalem	31.8026, 35.23693	470696	
Moshe Castel	Kings of Jerusalem	משה קסטל מלכי ירושלים, ירושלים, טרקלין קסטל, מלון היאט רג'נסי	Castel Lounge, Hyatt Regency Hotel, Jerusalem	31.8026, 35.23693	470698	
Avraham Ofek	Mural, 1972	אברהם אופק ציור קיר, 1972 בניין הדואר המרכזי, רחוב יפו 23, ירושלים	Central Post Office, Jerusalem	31.78027, 35.22229	465278	Show more images of this artwork
Ruth Horam	בחזרה לריבוע הרביעי	רות הורם בחזרה לריבוע הרביעי, קיר הכניסה, התיכון לאמנויות ע"ש צ'ארלס א. סמית, רח' יצחק אלחנן 4, ירושלים	Entrance Wall High School of the Arts, Jerusalem	coordinates missing	464989	
Micha Ullman	Water, 1997	מיכה אולמן מים (מכסה ביוב עם הטבעת יד האמן), 1997 רחוב האחים, מזרח ירושלים, ירושלים	Freres Street, East Jerusalem, Jerusalem	coordinates missing	464669	
Micha Ullman	Water	מיכה אולמן מים (מכסה ביוב עם הטבעת יד האמן), 1997	Zion Square, Jerusalem	31.77913, 35.22678	464659	
Dina Recanati	Environmental Sculpture, 1972	דינה רקאנטי פיסול סביבתי, 1972 בית הנשיא, ירושלים	Garden Collection, Presidential Mansion, Jerusalem	31.769737, 35.214426	467586	
Dorit Feldman	Wing to Wing, 2008	פלדמן, דורית; Wing to Wing, 2008	Givat Shaul, Jerusalem	coordinates missing	464850	
Zvi Aldouby	Statue, 1976	צבי אלדובי פסל, 1976 גן הזכרון, בית החולים הדסה הר הצופים, ירושלים	Hadassah Hospital Memorial Garden, Mt. Scopus, Jerusalem	coordinates missing	464347	
Zvi Aldouby	Wall Relief	צבי אלדבי תבליט קיר היכל השמות, יד ושם, ירושלים	Hall of Names, Yad Vashem, Jerusalem	31.774544, 35.174875	464350	
Dalia Meiri	Reliefs	דליה מאירי תבליטים בית ספר שדה, הר גילה	Har Gilo Field School, Jerusalem	coordinates missing	465177	
Dudu Gerstein	Head Within a Head, 1996	דוד גרשטיין; Head Within a Head, 1996 ירושלים, האוניברסיטה העברית	Hebrew University, Jerusalem	coordinates missing	464878	
Dudu Gerstein	A Whole World, 1999	דוד גרשטיין; A Whole World, 1999 ירושלים, האוניברסיטה העברית	Hebrew University, Jerusalem	coordinates missing	464880	
Dudu Gerstein	The Bus, 1999	דוד גרשטיין; The Bus, 1999 ירושלים, האוניברסיטה העברית	Hebrew University, Jerusalem	coordinates missing	464881	
Dudu Gerstein	Rush Hour, 2003	דוד גרשטיין; Rush Hour, 2003 ירושלים, האוניברסיטה העברית	Hebrew University, Jerusalem	coordinates missing	464884	
Dudu Gerstein	Peace Unto Israel, 2002	דוד גרשטיין; Peace Unto Israel, 2002 ירושלים, האוניברסיטה העברית	Hebrew University, Jerusalem	coordinates missing	464885	
Dudu Gerstein	Armillary	דוד גרשטיין; Armillary, ירושלים, האוניברסיטה העברית	Hebrew University, Jerusalem	coordinates missing	464886	
Dudu Gerstein	Above the Head, 1997	דוד גרשטיין; Above the Head, 1997 האוניברסיטה העברית בירושלים, גבעת רם	Hebrew University, Givat Ram, Jerusalem	coordinates missing	464879	
Itzhak Danziger	Wall Relief, 1958	he:יצחק דנציגר תבליט קיר, 1958 דרך בלפור, הכניסה לקמפוס האוניברסיטה העברית, גבעת רם, ירושלים	Hebrew University, Givat Ram, Jerusalem	coordinates missing	470791	
Igael Tumarkin	Peace Memorial, 1966	יגאל תומרקין אנדרטת השלום, 1966 דרך חברון (בסמוך לגשר המוביל לסנימטק), ירושלים	Hebron Road, Jerusalem	31.76991, 35.22605	465240	
Ezra Orion	Staircase, 1980	עזרא אוריון מעלות, 1980 רחוב הרצוג, ירושלים	Herzog St., Jerusalem	31.7611664, 35.200017	472948	
Dudu Gerstein	Audience, 2000	דוד גרשטיין; Audience, 2000 תיאטרון ירושלים	Jerusalem Theater, Jerusalem	31.769007, 35.215626	464882	
Yechiel Shemi	Wall Relief, 1968-71	יחיאל שמי, 1970תאטרון ירושלים (חזית המבנה), רחוב מרכוס 20, ירושלים	Jerusalem Theatre, Jerusalem	31.76908, 35.21552	467725	
Yechiel Shemi	Concrete Sculpture, 1985	יחיאל שמי פסל בטון, 1986 תאטרון ירושלים (בתוך המבנה), רחוב מרכוס 20, ירושלים	Jerusalem Theatre, Jerusalem	31.76908, 35.21552	467728	Show more images of this artwork
Yechiel Shemi	Genesis, 1982	יחיאל שמי בראשית, 1982 תאטרון ירושלים (מול החזית), רחוב מרכוס 20, ירושלים	Jerusalem Theatre plaza, Jerusalem	31.76908, 35.21552	467726	Show more images of this artwork
Igael Tumarkin	Chichen Itzma, 1986	יגאל תומרקין צ'יצן איטדה, 1986 קרית מנחם, ירושלים	Kiryat Menachem, Jerusalem	coordinates missing	465110	
Moshe Castel	Glory to Jerusalem, 1966	משה קסטל "שיר תהילה לירושלים" ציור קיר גדול מבזלת, 1966	Knesset, Jerusalem	31.776789, 35.205491	464721	
Dalia Meiri	Water Basins, 1983	דליה מאירי שקתות, 1983 ירושלים, גן הפעמון	Liberty Bell Garden, Jerusalem	31.770418, 35.223075	465179	
Yaacov Agam	Beating Heart	he:יעקב אגם לב פועם, מרכז שלום מאיר, רחוב דיסקין מס' 9, ירושלים	Mercaz Shalom Meir, Jerusalem	31.776725, 35.209990	480347	
Micha Ullman	Last Descendant monument, 2004	מיכה אולמן, 2004 הר הרצל, ירושלים	Mount Herzl, Jerusalem	coordinates missing	480349	Show more images of this artwork
Igael Tumarkin	Jerusalem - Three Faiths, 1992	יגאל תומרקין ירושלים-שלוש הדתות, 1992 הר הצופים, ירושלים	Mount Scopus, Jerusalem	coordinates missing	465107	
Avigdor Arikha	Five Stained Glass Windows	he:אביגדור אריכא חמישה חלונות ויטראז', אולם מועצת העיר, ירושלים	Municipal Council Hall, Jerusalem	31.780774, 35.223879	464400	
Gabi Klasmer	Car in the Sun	he:גבי קלזמר; Car in the Sun, ירושלים, ליד תחנת הרכבת הישנה ליד תיאטרון חאן	Near the old train station near Khan Theater, Jerusalem	31.767334, 35.224546	465067	
Drora Dominey	Environmental Sculpture, 1989	דרורה דומיני פיסול סביבתי, 1989 ירושלים, נווה יעקב	Neveh Yaacov, Jerusalem	coordinates missing	464761	
Igael Tumarkin	Chichen Itzma, 1986	יגאל תומרקין צ'יצן איטדה, 1986 פסגת זאב, ירושלים	Pisgat Ze'ev, Jerusalem	coordinates missing	465105	
Naftali Bezem	Ceiling Mural	נפתלי בזם ציור תקרה בבית הנשיא, משכן הנשיא, רחוב הנשיא 3, שכונת קוממיות (טלביה), ירושלים	President's House, Jerusalem	31.76972, 35.21417	464685	
Moshe Castel	Wall of Glory to Jerusalem, 1970	משה קסטל כותל תהילה לירושלים, 1970 קוממיות (טלביה), ירושלים	Presidential Mansion, Jerusalem	31.769722, 35.214167	464725	
Moshe Castel	Golden Scroll, 1970	he:משה קסטל מגילת זהב, 1970 משכן הנשיא, רחוב הנשיא 3, שכונת קוממיות (טלביה), ירושלים	Presidential Mansion, Jerusalem	31.769722, 35.214167	464728	
Dov Heller	Environmental Sculpture	he:דב הלר פיסול סביבתי, יער הנשיא, ירושלים	President's Forest, Jerusalem	coordinates missing	464981	
Dudu Gerstein	Shalom On Israel, 2002	דוד גרשטיין; Shalom On Israel, 2002	Rabin Building, Judaism Center, Jerusalem	coordinates missing	464883	
Israel Rabinovitz	Environmental Sculpture, 1992	ישראל רבינוביץ פיסול סביבתי (פסל מרבץ), 1992 ירושלים, רחוב רחל אימנו	Rachel Imenu Street, Jerusalem	coordinates missing	467545	
Dov Heller	The Frog, 1911	דב הלר הצפרדע, 1911 רחוב רמב"ם, ירושלים	Ramban Street, Jerusalem	coordinates missing	464983	
Igael Tumarkin	Challenge to the Sun, 1973	יגאל תומרקין אתגר לשמש, 1973 רמות אלון, ירושלים	Ramot Alon, Jerusalem	coordinates missing	465254	
Menashe Kadishman	Trees, 1990	מנשה קדישמן עצים, 1990 ירושלים, רחביה	Rehavia, Jerusalem	31.774816, 35.210365	465011	
Yechiel Shemi	Untitled, 1982	יחיאל שמי ללא כותרת, 1982 גן גוזף וסיל מייזר, שדרות רופין, ירושלים	Joseph and Ceil Mazer Park, Ruppin Boulevard, Jerusalem	coordinates missing	467727	
Avraham Ofek	Binding of Isaac, 1986	אברהם אופק עקדת יצחק, 1986 גן דניאל, ירושלים	Daniel garden, next to Safra Square, Jerusalem	31.77976, 35.22426	465285	Show more images of this artwork
Dov Heller	Environmental Sculpture	דב הלר פיסול סביבתי,	San Simon Grove, Jerusalem	31.761577, 35.206507	464982	
Noam Rabinowitz	Environmental Sculpture, 1992	נועם רבינוביץ פיסול סביבתי, 1992	Simon Bolivar Garden, Jerusalem	31.768469, 35.171755	467553	
Michael Gross	Environmental Sculpture, 1974	מיכאל רכסים תפילה לרכסים, 1974 גן סימון בוליבר, רחוב ברזיל, קרית היובל, ירושלים	Simon Bolivar Park, Kiryat Hayovel, Jerusalem	31.768469, 35.171755	464925	
Avraham Ofek	Mountains Round About Jerusalem, 1974	אברהם אופק ירושלים הרים סביב לה, 1974 בית ספר סטון, רחוב וולטה העלית 12, ירושלים	Stone School, Jerusalem	coordinates missing	465283	
Dudu Gerstein	Bicycle Rider, 1985	דוד גרשטיין; Bicycle Rider, 1985 ירושלים,האוניברסיטה העברית, הר הצופים	The Hebrew University, Mt. Scopus, Jerusalem	coordinates missing	464873	
Menashe Kadishman	Circles, 1977	מנשה קדישמן מעגלים, 1977 ירושלים, האוניברסיטה העברית, הר הצופים	The Hebrew University, Mt. Scopus, Jerusalem	coordinates missing	465012	
Menashe Kadishman	The Family Plaza, 1995	מנשה קדישמן משפחת פלאזה, 1995	The International School for Holocaust Studies, Yad Vashem, Jerusalem	31.774200, 35.175301	465014	
Dudu Gerstein	Tree of Donors, 1995	דוד גרשטיין; Tree of Donors, 1995	The Science Museum, Jerusalem	31.778187, 35.200527	464877	
Dudu Gerstein	Sculptural Children's Playground, 1988	דוד גרשטיין פסל-משחק, גילה, ירושלים, 1988	Weiller Park, Jerusalem	coordinates missing	464874	
Yaacov Agam	Wheels, 2002	יעקב אגם גלגלים, 2002 בית יד שרה, שדרות הרצל 124, ירושלים	Yad Sarah, Jerusalem	31.77726, 35.18503	464325	

=== Givat Ram, Jerusalem ===
Artist	Title, Year	Description	Address	Coordinates	ID	Image
Aharon Kahana	Sacrifice of Isaac	אהרן כהנא עקידת יצחק, האוניברסיטה העברית, קמפוס אדמונד י' ספרא, גבעת רם, ירושלים	Hebrew University, Jerusalem	coordinates missing	465037	
Mordechai Ardon	Stained Glass Window, 1984	מרדכי ארדון חלונות ארדון, 1984 הספרייה הלאומית, גבעת רם	National Library of Israel, Givat Ram, Jerusalem	31.77584, 35.19683	464399	Show more images of this artwork
Dani Karavan	Sundial, 1980	דני קרוון שעון שמש, 1980 בניין הג'וינט, גבעת רם	Hebrew University, Givat Ram, Jerusalem	coordinates missing	465044	

=== Israel Museum ===
Artist	Title, Year	Description	Address	Coordinates	ID	Image
Israel Hadany	Sky-Pool, 1987	Description from the Israel Museum site	Billy Rose Art Garden, Israel Museum, Jerusalem	31.77198, 35.20227	290654	
James Turrell	Space That Sees, 1992	Description from the Israel Museum site	Billy Rose Art Garden, Israel Museum, Jerusalem	31.7719, 35.20231	199801	
Richard Serra	Outdoor Circuit, 1986	Description from the Israel Museum site	Billy Rose Art Garden, Israel Museum, Jerusalem	31.7716, 35.203	194009	
Chana Orloff	Pipe Smoker (Mr. D.O. Widhopff), 1924	Description from the Israel Museum site	The Ruth Youth Wing, Israel Museum, Jerusalem	31.773417328510366, 35.20428414632154	193950	
Magdalena Abakanowicz	Negev, 1987	Description from the Israel Museum site	Billy Rose Art Garden, Israel Museum,	31.77146, 35.20255	202028	
Michael Gross	Cry, Pray, 1992	Description from the Israel Museum site	Billy Rose Art Garden, Israel Museum, Jerusalem	31.772, 35.2036	290652	
Arman	Homage to the Garment District, 1974	Description from the Israel Museum site	Billy Rose Art Garden, Israel Museum, Jerusalem	31.77212, 35.20262	194797	
Ofer Lellouche	Two, 2006	Description from the Israel Museum site	Billy Rose Art Garden, Israel Museum, Jerusalem	31.77199, 35.20263	379898	
Lynn Chadwick	Roaring Lion, 1960	Description from the Israel Museum site	Billy Rose Art Garden, Israel Museum,	31.77182, 35.20274	192230	
Henry Moore	Three-piece Sculpture: Vertebrae, 1969–1968	Description from the Israel Museum site	Billy Rose Art Garden, Israel Museum, Jerusalem	31.77219, 35.2028	204911	
Pablo Picasso	Profile, 1967	Description from the Israel Museum site	Billy Rose Art Garden, Israel Museum, Jerusalem	31.77253, 35.20287	192037	
Jean Tinguely	Eos XK³, 1965	Description from the Israel Museum site	Billy Rose Art Garden, Israel Museum, Jerusalem	31.77276, 35.20296	191966	
Micha Ullman	Equinox, 200-2009	Description from the Israel Museum site	Billy Rose Art Garden, Israel Museum, Jerusalem	31.77228, 35.20301	354028	
Ezra Orion	Sculpture, 1966	Description from the Israel Museum site	Billy Rose Art Garden, Israel Museum, Jerusalem	31.77264, 35.20309	290773	
Menashe Kadishman	Trees, 1985-1975	Description from the Israel Museum site	Billy Rose Art Garden, Israel Museum,	31.77299, 35.20317	290655	
Aristide Maillol	Action Enchained: Monument to Blanqui, 1907	Description from the Israel Museum site	Billy Rose Art Garden, Israel Museum,	31.77148, 35.20322	290658	
Emile-Antoine Bourdelle	Penelope, 1912	Description from the Israel Museum site	Billy Rose Art Garden, Israel Museum,	31.77137, 35.20324	192219	
Isamu Noguchi	Khmer, 1962	Description from the Israel Museum site	Billy Rose Art Garden, Israel Museum,	31.77124, 35.20328	191983	
Otto Freundlich	Ascension, 1929	Description from the Israel Museum site	Billy Rose Art Garden, Israel Museum,	31.7714, 35.2033	191629	
Marino Marini	An Idea in Space, 1970-1969	Description from the Israel Museum site	Billy Rose Art Garden, Israel Museum,	31.77178, 35.20334	193912	
Reginald (Reg) Butler	Young Girl with Chemise, 1958-1957	Description from the Israel Museum site	Billy Rose Art Garden, Israel Museum,	31.77121, 35.20335	192104	
Michael Gross	Queen, 1970-1969	Description from the Israel Museum site	Billy Rose Art Garden, Israel Museum,	31.77243, 35.20335	293509	
Lynn Chadwick	Two Figures (Conjunction XV), 1970	Description from the Israel Museum site	Billy Rose Art Garden, Israel Museum,	31.77118, 35.20337	194745	
Isamu Noguchi	Water Source Sculpture, 1965	Description from the Israel Museum site	Billy Rose Art Garden, Israel Museum,	31.77195, 35.2034	290659	
Elie Nadelman	Man in the Open Air, 1915	Description from the Israel Museum site	Billy Rose Art Garden, Israel Museum,	31.77151, 35.20342	192216	
Jacques Lipchitz	Mother and Child II, 1945-1941	Description from the Israel Museum site	Billy Rose Art Garden, Israel Museum,	31.77239, 35.20343	192215	
José de Creeft	Woman in the Sun, 1938	Description from the Israel Museum site	Billy Rose Art Garden, Israel Museum,	31.77145, 35.20344	192070	
Germaine Richier	The Diabolo Player, 1950	Description from the Israel Museum site	Billy Rose Art Garden, Israel Museum,	31.77136, 35.20344	191960	
Auguste Rodin	Adam, 1880	Description from the Israel Museum site	Billy Rose Art Garden, Israel Museum,	31.77333, 35.20366	192210	
David Smith	Cubi VI, 1963	Description from the Israel Museum site	Billy Rose Art Garden, Israel Museum,	31.77294, 35.20373	191659	
Alexander Archipenko	Woman Combing Her Hair, 1914	Description from the Israel Museum site	Billy Rose Art Garden, Israel Museum,	31.77277, 35.20376	192218	
Emile-Antoine Bourdelle	The Warrior of Montauban, 1898	Description from the Israel Museum site	Billy Rose Art Garden, Israel Museum,	31.77249, 35.20389	192220	
Claes Oldenburg and Coosje van Bruggen	Apple Core, 1992	Description from the Israel Museum site	Billy Rose Art Garden, Israel Museum,	31.77249, 35.203893	202040	
Jacob Epstein	Visitation, 1926	Description from the Israel Museum site	Billy Rose Art Garden, Israel Museum,	31.7715, 35.203	193780	
Alexander Calder	The Sun at Croton, 1960	Description from the Israel Museum site	Billy Rose Art Garden, Israel Museum,	31.7735, 35.2036	194222	
Menashe Kadishman	Suspense, 1966	Description from the Israel Museum site	Billy Rose Art Garden, Israel Museum,	31.774, 35.2036	202018	

=== Yad Vashem ===
Artist	Title, Year	Description	Address	Coordinates	ID	Image
Zvi Aldouby	Torn Curtain, 1977	צבי אלדבי "יריעה קרועה", היכל השמות, יד ושם, 1977 יד ושם, ירושלים	Yad Vashem, Jerusalem	31.774187, 35.175302	464348	
Naftali Bezem	Wall Relief	נפתלי בזם תבליט קיר, יד ושם, ירושלים	Yad Vashem, Jerusalem	31.774187, 35.175302	464681	
Arieh El hanani	Ohel Yizkor	אריה אל חנני אוהל יזכור, יד ושם, ירושלים	Yad Vashem, Jerusalem	31.774187, 35.175302	464781	Show more images of this artwork
Eli Ilan	Ultima	אלי אילן; Ultima, יד ושם, ירושלים	Yad Vashem, Jerusalem	31.774187, 35.175302	464993	
Buky Schwartz	Pillar of Heroism, 1967	בוקי שוורץ עמוד הגבורה, 1967 יד ושם, ירושלים	Yad Vashem, Jerusalem	31.774187, 35.175302	467674	
Buky Schwartz	Goals, 1969	בוקי שוורץ שערים, 1969 יד ושם, ירושלים	Yad Vashem, Jerusalem	31.774187, 35.175302	467675	

=== Mevaseret Zion ===
Artist	Title, Year	Description	Address	Coordinates	ID	Image
Dudu Gerstein	Butterflies, 2005	דוד גרשטיין פרפרים, 2005 תיכון הראל, רח' החוצבים 6, מבשרת ציון	Harel High School, Mevaseret Zion	coordinates missing	464890	
Menahem Shemi	Memorial to the Fallen of Harel Brigade, 1951	מנחם שמי אנדרטת זיכרון לנופלים של חטיבת הראל, 1951	Military Cemetery, Kiryat Anavim	31.81239, 35.12443	467722	

== Tel Aviv District ==
=== Tel Aviv-Yafo ===
Artist	Title, Year	Description	Address	Coordinates	ID	Image
Dov Feigin	Military Industry Memorial, 1989	דב פייגין ללא כותרת, 1989 גן התע"ש, רחוב השומר 7, גבעתיים	Water Institute at the Yosef Weissman Municipal Gallery, Rechov Hasomer 7, Tel Aviv-Yafo	32.068360, 34.769722	464842	Show more images of this artwork
Dina Kahana Gueler	Three Pillars, 1989	דינה כהנא גלר; 3 עמודים , אבן, 1989 רמת אביב	Tel Aviv-Yafo	coordinates missing	465034	
Menashe Kadishman	Birds(?), 2013	מנשה קדישמן ציפורים (?), 2013 רחוב אסתר המלכה 4, תל אביב-יפו	4 Esther Hamalka St, Tel Aviv-Yafo	32.079104, 34.774432	480514	
Menashe Kadishman	Horse, 2000	מנשה קדישמן סוס, 2000 מגדלי זיו, רח' ראול ולנברג 24, תל אביב-יפו	Ziv Towers, 24 Raoul Wallenberg st., Tel Aviv-Yafo	32.111526, 34.838852	480515	
Menashe Kadishman	Cut-Out Forest (Trees in Negative), 1975	מנשה קדישמן עצים בתשליל, 1975 ת 77, תל אביב-יפו (מתחת למוזיאון הפלמ"ח	Yitzak Rabin Center, 77 Rokach Boulevard, Tel Aviv-Yaff, Tel Aviv-Yafo	32.103138, 34.799570	465019	
Motti Mizrachi	Fall of the Muses, 1993	מוטי מזרחי נפילת המוזות, 1993 מגדל האופרה, רח' אלנבי 1, תל-אביב	1 Allenby St., Tel Aviv-Yafo, Tel Aviv-Yafo	32.07389, 34.76556	465231	
Motti Mizrachi	Oriental Kiss, 1992	מוטי מזרחי נשיקה מזרחית, 1992 מגדל האופרה, רח' אלנבי 1 (לובי), תל אביב	Allenby Street 1 (Lobby), Tel Aviv-Yafo	32.07389, 34.76556	282932	
Dorit Feldman	The Third Eye, 1983	דורית פלדמן העין השלישית, 1983 רחוב תוצרת הארץ, תל אביב-יפו	1 Tozeret Haarez, Tel Aviv-Yafo	32.073601, 34.795311	464856	
Dudu Gerstein	Homage to Alterman, 1998	דוד גרשטיין מחווה לאלתרמן, 1998	133 Dizengoff St., Tel Aviv-Yafo	32.082010, 34.773668	464910	
Aharon Adani	Avoth, 1994	אהרן אדני אבות, 1994 רחוב ז'בוטינסקי מס' 139, תל אביב-יפו	139 Jabotinsky at Hatzionut, Tel Aviv-Yafo	32.086320, 34.792475	464322	
Gideon Gechtman	Vase, 1992	גדעון גכטמן כד, 1992 רחוב אבן גבירול מס' 155, תל אביב-יפו	155 Ibn Gabirol Street, Tel Aviv-Yafo	32.091173, 34.782844	284808	
Israel Hadany	Blue Sculpture	ישראל הדני פסל כחול, 1988 רחוב ארלוזורוב 161, תל אביב-יפו	161 Arlosorof Street, Tel Aviv-Yafo	32.082704, 34.794421	464957	
Eli Ilan	War Between the Sons of Light and the Sons of Darkness, 1973	אלי אילן מלחמת בני אור בבני חושך, 1973 תל אביב, רחוב ויצמן 18, כיכר הי"א	18 Weizmann Street, Tel Aviv-Yafo	coordinates missing	464998	
Motti Mizrachi	Lamentation of the Angels, 1986	מוטי מזרחי קינת המלאכים, 1986 רח' אבא אחימאיר 23	23 AchiMeir St, Tel Aviv-Yafo	32.124715, 34.803113	282933	
Yechiel Shemi	Torn Steel, 1963	יחיאל שמי, 1963 תל אביב, רחוב דיזינגוף 253	253 Dizengoff St., Tel Aviv-Yafo	32.093270, 34.776490	467730	
Dov Or Ner	Sites of Ra, 1989	דב אור נר אתרים של רע, 1989 רח' דניאל פריש 3, תל אביב-יפו	3 Parrish St., Tel Aviv-Yafo	32.074344, 34.782474	282907	
Michael Gross	Crown and Robe, 1969	מיכאל גרוס כתר וגלימה, 1969 תל אביב-יפו, רחוב פנקס 30	30 Pinkas Street, Tel Aviv-Yafo	32.090856, 34.786766	282919	
Isaac Golombek	Untitled, 1990	יצחק גולמבק ללא כותרת, 1990 תל אביב, יפו, ירושלים 50	50 Jerusalem St., Jaffa, Tel Aviv-Yafo	32.031577, 34.799988	464917	
Israel Hadany	Blue Sculpture, 1988	he:ישראל הדני פסל כחול, 1988 רחוב ארלוזורוב 161, תל אביב-יפו	Arlosoroff Street 161, Tel Aviv-Yafo	32.082743, 34.794341	282925	
Ezra Orion	Diagonal Force-field, 1990-1991	עזרא אוריון שדה-כח נטוי, 1990-1991 רח' בן-יוסף, רמת אביב ג', תל אביב-יפו	Ben Yosef St., Tel Aviv-Yafo	coordinates missing	282906	
Dorit Feldman	Mark the Four Points of the Compass, 2001	דורית פלדמן בסימן ארבע רוחות השמיים, 2001 רחוב ארנון 8, תל אביב-יפו	Armon 8, next to the Hirsch Early Childhood Center, Tel Aviv-Yafo	32.083694, 34.770115	464857	
Gad Ullman	Science and Handicrafts, 1978	גד אולמן מדע ועבודות יד, נושאים שונים כמו מדע, תעשייה, חקלאות, ועוד, צרובים בלוחות נחושת, 1978 בית אסיה, רחוב ויצמן מס 4, תל אביב-יפו	Asia House, Tel Aviv-Yafo	32.078168, 34.788502	464680	
Dudu Gerstein	Two Wall Pieces, 1995	דוד גרשטיין; Two Wall Pieces, 1995	Bank Leumi, Tel Aviv-Yafo	coordinates missing	464902	
Gad Ullman	Hadassah Shield for City Garden, 1986	גד אולמן מגן (לוגו-סמל) הדסה לפארק עירוני, 1986 תל אביב, בנק הלאומי, גן העיר	Bank Leumi, City Garden, Tel Aviv-Yafo	32.082761, 34.781046	464702	
Yaacov Dorchin	A Well and Four Dogs, 1991	יעקב דורצ'ין באר וארבעה כלבים, 1991 רחוב קינג ג'ורג פינת שדרות בן ציון, תל אביב-יפו	Ben Zion Blvd. the Corner of King George St., Tel Aviv-Yafo	32.074076, 34.775529	464778	
Yaacov Agam	Roots - Menora, 1985	יעקב אגם שורשים - מנורה, 1985 גן ברנדר, רח' יהושע בן נון 71, תל אביב-יפו	Bernard Garden, Tel Aviv-Yafo	32.093753, 34.781913	464329	
Dina Recanati	Parchment, 1984	דינה רקאנטי גווילים, 1984 רחוב שאול המלך מס' 27, תל אביב-יפו	Bet Ariela Plaza, Tel-Aviv Museum of Art, Tel Aviv-Yafo	32.077634, 34.786825	467592	
Dudu Gerstein	Day and Night, 2001	דוד גרשטיין יום ולילה, 2001 לובי חברת בזק, מגדלי עזריאלי, תל אביב-יפו	Bezeq Lobby, Azrieli Centre, Tel Aviv-Yafo	coordinates missing	464906	
Gabi Klasmer	Mandate-era Sculpture No. 1, 1991	גבי קלזמר פסל מנדטורי מס' 1, 1991 שדרות בן גוריון, תל אביב-יפו	Boulevard Ben Gurion, Tel Aviv-Yafo	coordinates missing	282941	
Dina Kahana Gueler	Untitled	דינה כהנא גלר בלי כותרת,	Carlebach Street 1, Tel Aviv-Yafo	coordinates missing	282929	
Dudu Gerstein	City Square, 1997	דוד גרשטיין; City Square, 1997	Center of Performing Arts, Tel Aviv-Yafo	coordinates missing	464903	
Gad Ullman	Silver Screen, 1989	גד אולמן מסך הכסף, תחריט על מראה, 1989 סינמטק תל אביב, רחוב שפרינצק 2, תל אביב-יפו	Cinemateque, Tel Aviv-Yafo	32.070766, 34.783289	464689	
Zvi Aldouby	In the Hideouts, 1975	צבי אלדבי "במסתרים" (ברונזה), 1975	Courtyard of the Artists' Pavilion, Tel Aviv-Yafo	coordinates missing	464354	
Yaacov Agam	Fire and Water Fountain, 1986	יעקב אגם פסל אש ומים, 1986 כיכר צינה דיזנגוף, תל אביב-יפו	Dizengoff Square, Tel Aviv-Yafo	32.078018, 34.774203	282901	Show more images of this artwork
Dudu Gerstein	Pupils, 1997	דוד גרשטיין; Pupils, 1997	Dizengoff Street, Tel Aviv-Yafo	coordinates missing	464904	
Dani Karavan	Kikar Levana, 1988	דני קרוון כיכר לבנה, 1988 פארק אידית וולפסון, דרך הטייסים 20, תל אביב-יפו	Edith Wolfson Park, Tel Aviv-Yafo	coordinates missing	465041	
Emanuel Sela (Blaustein)	Wall Painting	עמנואל סלע (בלוישטיין) ציור קיר, בניין הטלוויזיה החינוכית הישראלית, רחוב קלאוזנר 14, רמת אביב, תל אביב	Educational Television Building, Tel Aviv-Yafo	32.115571, 34.807927	467698	
Gad Ullman	Birds-eye view (from an airplane) of a Chinese Landscape, 1978	גד אולמן נוף סיני ממעוף-מטוס הוא נושאו של קיר המצוייר בצבעי אקריליק על בד, 1978 מלון בזל, רחוב הירקון 156, תל אביב-יפו	Entrance Hall of Hotel Basel, Tel Aviv-Yafo	coordinates missing	464682	
Gad Ullman	Yediot Aharonot, 1976	גד אולמן ידיעות אחרונות - האות העברית המודפסת מאל"ף ועד ת"ו - בציור קיר עשוי באלומיניום, 1976 בית ידיעות אחרונות, דרך בגין פינת רחוב מוזס, תל אביב-יפו	Entrance hall of the newspaper, Tel Aviv-Yafo	32.076034, 34.792362	464683	
Gad Ullman	In Movement, 1997	גד אולמן בתנועה, פלדת אל חלד, 1997	French House, Tel Aviv-Yafo	coordinates missing	464687	
Avraham Ofek	Hailek Ben Shachar, 1982	אברהם אופק הלל בן שחר, 1982 גן הרכבת, רחוב ארלוזורוב, תל אביב-יפו	Gan Hrakevet, Arlozorof street, Tel Aviv-Yafo	coordinates missing	452098	
Menashe Kadishman	Uprise, 1967-1976	מנשה קדישמן התרוממות, 1976-1967 כיכר הבימה, תל אביב-יפו	Habima square, Tel Aviv-Yafo	32.07232, 34.77914	282940	Show more images of this artwork
Batia Lishansky	The Silver Platter, 1960	he:בתיה לישנסקי מגש הכסף, 1960 מוזיאון הגנה, שד' רוטשילד 23, תל אביב-יפו	Haganah Museum, Tel Aviv-Yafo	32.063558, 34.772088	465100	
Motti Mizrachi	angel of peace, 1992	מוטי מזרחי מלאך השלום, 1992 בית דני ואודיטוריום דוהל, רחוב התקוה 76, שכונת תקווה, תל אביב-יפו	Beit Dani, Hatikvah neighborhood, Tel Aviv-Yafo	coordinates missing	465228	
Igael Tumarkin	Installation of Iron and Stone	יגאל תומרקין; Installation of Iron and Stone, פרק הירקון, תל אביב	Yarkon Park, Tel Aviv-Yafo	coordinates missing	464738	
Igael Tumarkin	Assembly of Geometric Features Along a Path	יגאל תומרקין; Assembly of Geometric Features Along a Path, פרק הירקון, תל אביב	Yarkon Park, Tel Aviv-Yafo	coordinates missing	464740	
Nachum Gutman	Mosaic Wall, 1961	נחום גוטמן קיר פסיפס, 1961 תל אביב, בית הרבנות הראשית	House of the Chief Rabbinate, Tel Aviv-Yafo	coordinates missing	464949	
Igael Tumarkin	Holocaust and Resurrection, 1975	יגאל תומרקין השואה והתקומה, 1975 כיכר רבין, רחוב אבן גבירול, תל אביב-יפול 69	Ibn Gabirol 69, Tel Aviv-Yafo	32.080186, 34.780677	282951	
Gideon Gechtman	The Vase, 1992	גדעון גכטמן אגרטל, 1992 תל אביב, רחוב אבן גבירול 155	Ibn Gabirol Street 155, Tel Aviv-Yafo	32.091183, 34.782855	464859	
Dov Feigin	Sculpture in the Garden, 1982	דב פייגין ללא כותרת, 1982 גן העצמאות, תל אביב-יפו	Independence Park, Tel Aviv-Yafo	coordinates missing	464841	
Buky Schwartz	Pinball Machine	בוקי שוורץ מכונת פינבול, בית ישרכארט, רח' המסגר 40, תל אביב-יפו	Isracard Building, Tel Aviv-Yafo	32.064702, 34.786778	467680	
Buky Schwartz	Capital	בוקי שוורץ כותרת, בית ישרכארט, רח' המסגר 40, תל אביב-יפו	Isracard Building, Tel Aviv-Yafo	32.064702, 34.786778	467681	
Itzhak Golombek	Untitled, 1990	יצחק גולומבק בלי כותרת, 1990 שד' ירושלים, ת"א	Jerusalem Boulevard, Tel Aviv-Yafo	coordinates missing	282916	
Igael Tumarkin	Last train from Jaffa to Jerusalem	יגאל תומרקין הרכבת האחרונה מיפו לירושלים, שדרות ירושלים פינת רחוב אילת, תל אביב-יפו	Jerusalem Boulevard, Tel Aviv-Yafo	coordinates missing	471118	
Buky Schwartz	Obelisk, 1996	בוקי שוורץ אובליסק, 1996 רחוב קיבוץ גלויות 34, תל אביב-יפו	Kibbutz Galuyot St. 34, Tel Aviv-Yafo	32.051773, 34.768339	467686	
Dudu Gerstein	Field of Butterflies, 2008	דוד גרשטיין; Field of Butterflies, 2008	Lobby of "Beit Reich", Tel Aviv-Yafo	32.084822, 34.782527	464907	
Motti Mizrachi	Column, Screw and Ducks, 1989	מוטי מזרחי עמוד, בורג וברווזים, 1989 כיכר מסריק, תל אביב-יפו	Masaryk Square, Tel Aviv-Yafo	32.07833, 34.77833	465229	
Nachum Gutman	Memorial Mosaic for the Herzliya Hebrew Gymnasium, 1966	נחום גוטמן פסיפס לזכר גימנסיה "הרצליה", 1966 מגדל שלום, תל אביב, תל אביב-יפו	Migdal Shalom, Tel Aviv-Yafo	32.064665, 34.769235	464950	
Eli Ilan	Enrivonmental Sculpture, 1973	אלי אילן פיסול סביבתי, 1973	Opposite Municipality, Tel Aviv-Yafo	coordinates missing	464995	
Zvi Aldouby	Sculpture in the Garden, 1961	צבי אלדבי "פסל בגן", 1961	Oriental Fair, Tel Aviv-Yafo	32.100979, 34.775685	464353	
Aryeh Elhanani	The Hebrew Worker, 1934	אריה אל חנני הפועל העברי, 1934 נמל תל אביב, תל אביב-יפו	Palmer Square (today Arieh el-Hanani plaza, Tel Aviv Port), Tel Aviv-Yafo	coordinates missing	464784	
Eran Shakine	Kikar Ha'ir, 2003	ערן שאקין; Kikar Ha'ir, 2003	Plaza at Museum Towers, Tel Aviv-Yafo	coordinates missing	467712	
Menashe Kadishman	Suspense, 1968	מנשה קדישמן מתח, 1968 תל אביב, רחבת מוזיאון תל אביב	Plaza in front of the Tel Aviv Museum of Art, Tel Aviv-Yafo	32.077654, 34.786751	465025	
Ezra Orion	Tilted Power Field	עזרא אוריון,	Ramat Aviv Gimmel, Tel Aviv-Yafo	coordinates missing	465304	
Dina Kahana Gueler	Three pillars, 1989	דינה כהנא גלר; 3 עמודים, 1989	Ramat Aviv old commercial center, Tel Aviv-Yafo	coordinates missing	282928	
Eli Ilan	The War of the Children of Light Upon the Children of Darkness, 1973	אלי אילן מלחמת בני אור בבני חושך, 1973 כיכר הי"א, רחוב ויצמן פינת רחוב בארי, תל אביב-יפו	Rehavat ha-yud aleph, Weizmann St., Tel Aviv-Yafo	32.082465, 34.789143	282908	
Yadid Rubin	Painted Metal	ידיד רובין מתכת צבועה,	Rehov Dubnov, Tel Aviv-Yafo	coordinates missing	467623	
Avi Setton	Aeropassivics 3, 1993	אבי סיטון אווירופסיביקה 3, 1993 מחלף רוקח, נתיבי איילון לכיוון צפון, תל אביב-יפו	Rokach Interchange, Northbound Ayalon Highway, Tel Aviv-Yafo	32.101954, 34.803608	467708	
Buky Schwartz	Window to the Avenue	בוקי שורץ חלון לשדרה, שדרות רוטשילד מס' 41, תל אביב-יפו	Rothschild Blvd, Tel Aviv-Yafo	32.064076, 34.774486	282944	
Drora Dominey	Spring, 1989	דרורה דומיני אביב, 1989 שד' רוטשילד 113, תל אביב	Rothschild Blvd 113, Tel Aviv-Yafo	32.069409, 34.778285	282921	
Buky Schwartz	Painted Steel Sculpture, 1995	בוקי שוורץ פסלי פלדה צבועה, 1995 שד' רוטשילד, תל אביב	Rothschild Blvd., Tel Aviv-Yafo	coordinates missing	467682	
Nachum Gutman	Little Tel Aviv, 1972	נחום גוטמן תל אביב הקטנה, 1972 תל אביב, שדרות רוטשילד 1	Rothschild Boulevard 1, Tel Aviv-Yafo	32.062978, 34.769205	464952	
Israel Hadany	Environmental Sculpture	ישראל הדני פיסול סביבתי,	Shenkin Garden, Tel Aviv-Yafo	coordinates missing	464956	
Amnon (Zigi) Ben Haim	Note The Grass, 1994	אמנון (זיגי) בן חיים הערה בדשא, 1994 רחוב שלונסקי 6, תל אביב-יפו	Shlonsky 6, Tel Aviv-Yafo	32.117793, 34.819485	464549	
Eli Ilan	The Victim, 1972	אלי אילן הקורבן, 1972 פארק צ'ארלס קלור, תל אביב-יפו	Sir Charles Clore Park, Tel Aviv-Yafo	coordinates missing	464994	
Eli Ilan	Sacrifice, 1972	אלי אילן הקורבן, 1972 פארק צ'ארלס קלור, תל אביב-יפו	Sir Charles Clore Park, Tel Aviv-Yafo	coordinates missing	464997	
Ilan Averbuch	Harp the Sea and the Quiet Wind, 1989	אילן אורבוך נבל, ים והרוח השרטה, 1989 תל אביב, טיילת סר צ'ארלס קלור	Sir Charles Clore Park Boardwalk, Tel Aviv-Yafo	coordinates missing	464444	
Yaacov Chefetz	First Attempts of Flight No. 3, 1989	יעקב חפץ נסיונות התעופה הראשונים מס' 3, 1989 רח' אינשטיין (שכון ל') , ת"א	St. Einstein (housing L), Tel Aviv-Yafo	coordinates missing	282926	
Yaacov Chefetz	Galilee Landscape, 1989	יעקב חפץ נוף גלילי, 1989 רח' גרונר מול מס' 7 , ת"א	St. Gruner against No. 7, Tel Aviv-Yafo	coordinates missing	282927	
Dov Feigin	Sukkah Theme II	דב פייגין סוכה, שדרות קק"ל מס' 35, רמת אביב, תל אביב-יפו	Tel Aviv Jaffa Street JNF 35, Tel Aviv-Yafo	coordinates missing	282939	
Buky Schwartz	Mosquito, 2007	בוקי שוורץ מוסקיטו, 2007 מוזיאון תל אביב לאמנות, תל אביב-יפו	Tel Aviv Museum of Art, Tel Aviv-Yafo	coordinates missing	467683	
Shraga Weil	Ceramic Relief (detail), 1970	שרגא וייל תבליט קיר (פרט), 1970 בית הכנסת הגדול, רחוב אלנבי 110, תל אביב-יפו	Tel Aviv's Great Synagogue, 110 Alenbi st., Tel Aviv-Yafo	32.064391, 34.772334	471930	
Itzhak Danziger	Monument Portrait of Ze'ev Jabotinsky, 1967	יצחק דנציגר דיוקן זאב זבוטינסקי, 1967 תל אביב יפו, מכון ז'בוטינסקי	The Jabotinsky Institute, Tel Aviv-Yafo	32.072896, 34.774952	464759	
Ilan Averbuch	Dial, 1995	אילן אורבוך; Dial, 1995 רחוב העבודה 8, תל אביב-יפו	The Works 8, Tel Aviv-Yafo	32.070722, 34.772531	464450	
Pinchas Eshet	Street Sculpture, 1981	פנחס עשת פסל רחוב, 1981 גן וולובלסקי- קרני	Wolovsski-Karni Garden, Tel Aviv-Yafo	coordinates missing	282937	
Dalia Meiri	Environmental Sculpture, 1981	דליה מאירי פיסול סביבתי, 1981 גן וולבולסקי קרני, תל-אביב	Wolovsski-Karni Garden, Tel Aviv-Yafo	coordinates missing	465188	
Itzhak Danziger	Serpentine, 1975	יצחק דנציגר עקלתון, 1975 תל אביב, פארק הירקון	Yarkon Park, Tel Aviv-Yafo	coordinates missing	464758	Show more images of this artwork
Dani Karavan	Land is My Land, 1995	דני קרוון אדמה אדמתי, 1995	Yehuda Halevy 63, Tel Aviv-Yafo	32.063262, 34.775633	465043	
Nahum Tevet	Ursa Major (with chairs and boats), 2009	נחום טבת, 2009 בניין הבנק הבינלאומי, שדרות רוטשילד, תל אביב-יפו	Tel Aviv-Yafo	coordinates missing	480334	
Eli Ilan	Eternal Youth, 1979	אלי אילן נעורים נצחיים, 1979 רחוב מפרץ שלמה 1, תל אביב-יפו	Mifratz Shlomo, Jaffa	coordinates missing	464991	

=== Tel Aviv Museum of Art ===
Artist	Title, Year	Description	Address	Coordinates	ID	Image
Menashe Kadishman	Suspense / Big Floating, 1975	מנשה קדישמן רחיפה גדולה, 1975 מוזיאון תל אביב לאמנות, תל אביב-יפו	Tel Aviv Museum of Art, Tel Aviv-Yafo	coordinates missing	480513	Show more images of this artwork
Michael Gross	Trio, 1993	מיכאל גרוס טריו, 1993 רחבת בית אריאלה, מוזיאון תל-אביב לאמנות, תל אביב-יפו	Bet Ariela Plaza, Tel-Aviv Museum of Art, Tel Aviv-Yafo	coordinates missing	282920	
Dina Recanati	Parchment, 1984	דינה רקאנטי גווילים, 1984 רחוב שאול המלך מס' 27, תל אביב-יפו	Bet Ariela Plaza, Tel-Aviv Museum of Art, Tel Aviv-Yafo	coordinates missing	467592	
Micha Ullman	Gate, 1995	מיכה אולמן שער, 1995	King Shaul Blvd 19, Tel Aviv-Yafo	coordinates missing	464657	
Micha Ullman	Stage, 2011	מיכה אולמן, 2011	Performing Arts Center Plaza, King Saul Blvd 19, Tel Aviv-Yafo	coordinates missing	464658	
Menashe Kadishman	Sacrifice of Isaac	מנשה קדישמן עקידת יצחק, תל אביב, רחבת מוזיאון תל אביב	Plaza in front of the Tel Aviv Museum of Art, Tel Aviv-Yafo	coordinates missing	465022	
Menashe Kadishman	Suspense, 1968	מנשה קדישמן מתח, 1968 תל אביב, רחבת מוזיאון תל אביב	Plaza in front of the Tel Aviv Museum of Art, Tel Aviv-Yafo	coordinates missing	465025	
Avraham Ofek	Stone Sculpture, 1987	אברהם אופק פסל אבן, 1987 גן הפסלים ע"ש לולה בר אבנר, מוזיאון תל אביב לאמנות, תל אביב-יפו	Sculpture Garden at the Tel Aviv Museum of Art, Tel Aviv-Yafo	coordinates missing	452102	
Yaacov Dorchin	Angel, 1995	יעקב דורצ'ין מלאך, 1995	Sculpture Garden, Tel Aviv Museum of Art, Tel Aviv-Yafo	coordinates missing	464779	
Buky Schwartz	Mosquito, 2007	בוקי שוורץ מוסקיטו, 2007 מוזיאון תל אביב לאמנות, תל אביב-יפו	Tel Aviv Museum of Art, Tel Aviv-Yafo	coordinates missing	467683	
Erez Israeli	Wreaths, 2011	ארז ישראלי זרים, 2011 גן נתה, מוזיאון תל אביב-לאמנות, תל אביב-יפו	Tel Aviv-Yafo	coordinates missing	442957	
Gad Ullman	Science and Handicrafts, 1978	גד אולמן מדע ועבודות יד, נושאים שונים כמו מדע, תעשייה, חקלאות, ועוד, צרובים בלוחות נחושת, 1978 בית אסיה, רחוב ויצמן מס 4, תל אביב-יפו	Asia House, Tel Aviv-Yafo	coordinates missing	464680	

=== Tel Aviv University ===
Artist	Title, Year	Description	Address	Coordinates	ID	Image
Michael Gross	To the Victims of the Sea, 1969	מיכאל גרוס אנדרטה לזכר יורדי הים, 1969 קמפוס אוניברסיטת תל אביב, תל אביב-יפו	Campus of Tel Aviv University, Tel Aviv-Yafo	coordinates missing	451852	
Eli Ilan	Dolmic Arch I, 1981	אלי אילן קשת דולמנית, 1981 כיכר אלברט איינשטיין, אוניברסיטת תל אביב, תל אביב-יפו	Albert Einstein Square, Tel Aviv University, Tel Aviv-Yafo	coordinates missing	464996	Show more images of this artwork
Buky Schwartz	Metropolis, 1990	בוקי שוורץ מטרופוליס, 1990 אוניברסיטת תל אביב, תל אביב-יפו	Tel Aviv University, Tel Aviv-Yafo	coordinates missing	464303	
Micha Ullman	Chair	מיכה אולמן; Chair, הגלריה האוניברסיטאית, אוניברסיטת תל אביב	Tel Aviv University, Tel Aviv-Yafo	coordinates missing	464661	Show more images of this artwork
Igael Tumarkin	Happenings, 1972	יגאל תומרקין התרחשויות, 1972 אוניברסיטת תל אביב	Tel Aviv University, Tel Aviv-Yafo	coordinates missing	464745	Show more images of this artwork
Igael Tumarkin	Homage to Johann Kepler, 1972	יגאל תומרקין מחווה ליוהן קפלר, 1972 אוניברסיטת תל אביב	Tel Aviv University, Tel Aviv-Yafo	coordinates missing	464746	
Dov Feigin	Ladders, 1957 / 1994	דב פייגין סולמות, 1957/1994 אוניברסיטת תל אביב, תל אביב-יפו	Tel Aviv University, Tel Aviv-Yafo	coordinates missing	464839	
Dov Feigin	Spiral, 1980	דב פייגין ספירלה, 1980 אוניברסיטת תל אביב, תל אביב-יפו	Tel Aviv University, Tel Aviv-Yafo	coordinates missing	464840	
Dudu Gerstein	Spirit of Freedom, 2009	דוד גרשטיין רוח החופש, 2009 אוניברסיטת תל אביב	Tel Aviv University, Tel Aviv-Yafo	coordinates missing	464908	
Michael Gross	Memorial for the Fallen Soldiers, 1985	מיכאל גרוס אנדרטה לזכר חללינו במערכות ישראל, 1985 אוניברסיטת תל אביב	Tel Aviv University, Tel Aviv-Yafo	coordinates missing	464930	
Michael Gross	Stool No. 2, 1982	מיכאל גרוס שרפרף מס' 2, 1982 אוניברסיטת תל אביב	Tel Aviv University, Tel Aviv-Yafo	coordinates missing	464931	
Israel Hadany	Vertical Construction, 1990	ישראל הדני; Vertical Construction, 1990 אוניברסיטת תל אביב	Tel Aviv University, Tel Aviv-Yafo	coordinates missing	464958	
Menashe Kadishman	Sacrifice of Isaac, 1985	מנשה קדישמן עקדת יצחק, 1985 אוניברסיטת תל אביב	Tel Aviv University, Tel Aviv-Yafo	coordinates missing	465023	
Menashe Kadishman	Suspense, 1968	מנשה קדישמן מתח, 1968 אוניברסיטת תל אביב	Tel Aviv University, Tel Aviv-Yafo	coordinates missing	465024	
Dina Recanati	Environmental Sculpture, 1985	דינה רקאנטי פיסול סביבתי, 1985 אוניברסיטת תל אביב, תל אביב-יפו	Tel Aviv University, Tel Aviv-Yafo	coordinates missing	467593	
Belu Simion Fainaru	If The World A., 1992	בלו סימיון פיינרו, 1992 הגלריה האוניברסיטאית, אוניברסיטת תל אביב, תל אביב-יפו	Tel Aviv University Gallery, Tel Aviv-Yafo	coordinates missing	480339	
Avraham Ofek	"Return to Zion" (mural), 1976	אברהם אופק "שיבת ציון", ציור קיר, 1976 ספריית אוניברסיטת תל אביב	Tel Aviv University Library, Tel Aviv-Yafo	coordinates missing	465291	

=== Abu Nabut Park, Tel Aviv-Yafo ===
Artist	Title, Year	Description	Address	Coordinates	ID	Image
Igael Tumarkin	Himeji	יגאל תומרקין הימג'י, פארק אבו נבוט , דרך בן צבי 51, יפו	Abu Nabut Park, Derech Ben-Zvi 51, Jaffa	32.04744, 34.76604	464729	
Igael Tumarkin	Samurai Dialogue	יגאל תומרקין דיאלוג הסמוראים, פארק אבו נבוט , דרך בן צבי 51, יפו	Abu Nabut Park, Derech Ben-Zvi 51, Jaffa	32.04744, 34.76604	464736	
Igael Tumarkin	Witches Sabbath	יגאל תומרקין שבת של מכשפות, פארק אבו נבוט , דרך בן צבי 51, יפו	Abu Nabut Park, Derech Ben-Zvi 51, Jaffa	32.04744, 34.76604	465257	
Igael Tumarkin	Totem and Taboo, 1992	יגאל תומרקין טוטם וטאבו, 1992 פארק אבו נבוט , דרך בן צבי 51, יפו	Abu Nabut Park, Derech Ben-Zvi 51, Jaffa	32.04744, 34.76604	465259	
Igael Tumarkin	Stabile Mobile	יגאל תומרקין סטביל מוביל, פארק אבו נבוט , דרך בן צבי 51, יפו	Abu Nabut Park, Derech Ben-Zvi 51, Jaffa	32.04744, 34.76604	465261	
Igael Tumarkin	Pax, 1992	יגאל תומרקין; Pax, 1992 פארק אבו נבוט , דרך בן צבי 51, יפו	Abu Nabut Park, Derech Ben-Zvi 51, Jaffa	32.04744, 34.76604	465262	
Igael Tumarkin	Memory of the Future, 1989	יגאל תומרקין זכרון העתיד, 1989 פארק אבו נבוט , דרך בן צבי 51, יפו	Abu Nabut Park, Derech Ben-Zvi 51, Jaffa	32.04744, 34.76604	465264	
Igael Tumarkin	Macht Arbeit Frei?, 1999	יגאל תומרקין; Macht Arbeit Frei?, 1999 פארק אבו נבוט , דרך בן צבי 51, יפו	Abu Nabut Park, Derech Ben-Zvi 51, Jaffa	32.04744, 34.76604	465265	Show more images of this artwork
Igael Tumarkin	Locked, 1994	יגאל תומרקין נעול, 1994 פארק אבו נבוט , דרך בן צבי 51, יפו	Abu Nabut Park, Derech Ben-Zvi 51, Jaffa	32.04744, 34.76604	465266	
Igael Tumarkin	Last Supper with Broken Obelisk	יגאל תומרקין סעודה אחרונה ואובליסק שבור, פארק אבו נבוט , דרך בן צבי 51, יפו	Abu Nabut Park, Derech Ben-Zvi 51, Jaffa	32.04744, 34.76604	465269	
Igael Tumarkin	Kafka Machine, 1997	יגאל תומרקין מכונת קפקא מס' 7, 1997 פארק אבו נבוט , דרך בן צבי 51, יפו	Abu Nabut Park, Derech Ben-Zvi 51, Jaffa	32.04744, 34.76604	465272	
Igael Tumarkin	Jerusalem, 1992	יגאל תומרקין ירושלים, 1992 פארק אבו נבוט , דרך בן צבי 51, יפו	Abu Nabut Park, Derech Ben-Zvi 51, Jaffa	32.04744, 34.76604	465273	
Igael Tumarkin	For Yitzhak Rabin, 1996	יגאל תומרקין ליצחק רבין, 1996 פארק אבו נבוט , דרך בן צבי 51, יפו	Abu Nabut Park, Derech Ben-Zvi 51, Jaffa	32.04744, 34.76604	465275	
Igael Tumarkin	Filippo Brunelleschi, 1996	יגאל תומרקין פיליפו ברונלסקי, 1996 פארק אבו נבוט , דרך בן צבי 51, יפו	Abu Nabut Park, Derech Ben-Zvi 51, Jaffa	32.04744, 34.76604	465279	
Igael Tumarkin	Ding, 2000	יגאל תומרקין דינג, 2000 פארק אבו נבוט , דרך בן צבי 51, יפו	Abu Nabut Park, Derech Ben-Zvi 51, Jaffa	32.04744, 34.76604	465280	
Igael Tumarkin	Coreolane, 1997	יגאל תומרקין קוראולנוס, 1997 פארק אבו נבוט , דרך בן צבי 51, יפו	Abu Nabut Park, Derech Ben-Zvi 51, Jaffa	32.04744, 34.76604	465284	
Igael Tumarkin	Blue	יגאל תומרקין כחול, פארק אבו נבוט , דרך בן צבי 51, יפו	Abu Nabut Park, Derech Ben-Zvi 51, Jaffa	32.04744, 34.76604	465287	

=== Bat Yam ===
Artist	Title, Year	Description	Address	Coordinates	ID	Image
Israel Hadany		ישראל הדני פסל מים,	Bat-Yam	coordinates missing	480788	

=== Givatayim ===
Artist	Title, Year	Description	Address	Coordinates	ID	Image
Buky Schwartz	Aviron	בוקי שוורץ אווירון, תיאטרון גבעתיים, רחוב רמז 40, גבעתיים	Givatayim Theatre, 40 Remez St., Givatayim	coordinates missing	467672	
Batia Lishansky	Commemorating the Ukraine Pogroms in the Borochov Quarter, 1955	בתיה לישנסקי פרעות אוקראינה, בשכונת בורוכוב, 1955 בית ספר בורוכוב, רחוב יפה נוף 2, גבעתיים	Borochov School, 2 Yefe Nof St., Givatayim	coordinates missing	465090	
Shalom Sebba	To the Memory of the Fallen, 1955	שלום סבה לזכר הנופלים (הנה אני מביא לכם רוח וחייתם), 1955 בית יד לבנים, רחוב גורדון 26, גבעתיים	Givatayim	coordinates missing	467692	

=== Mikveh Israel ===
Artist	Title, Year	Description	Address	Coordinates	ID	Image
Motti Mizrachi	Theodor Herzl Meeting with the German Emperor, 2012	מוטי מזרחי פגישת הרצל עם קיסר גרמניה, ברונזה, 2012	Mikveh Israel	32.03246, 34.78392	465225	

=== Misgav ===
Artist	Title, Year	Description	Address	Coordinates	ID	Image
Dalia Meiri	Memorial site for Terror Victims, 2006	דליה מאירי פסל באתר הזיכרון לזכר נפגעי פעולות איבה, 2006	Australia Park, Misgav	32.04271, 34.77319	465185	

=== Moledet ===
Artist	Title, Year	Description	Address	Coordinates	ID	Image
Dalia Meiri	Environmental Sculpture, 1977	דליה מאירי פיסול סביבתי, 1977 מולדת	Moledet	32.05574, 34.77325	465186	

=== Ramat Gan ===
Artist	Title, Year	Description	Address	Coordinates	ID	Image
Igael Tumarkin	Memorial for Itzhak Rabin, 1997	יגאל תומרקין אנדרטה לזכר יצחק רבין, 1997 בסמוך למוזיאון לאמנות ישראלית, דרך אבא הלל 146, רמת גן	Museum of Israeli Art, Ramat Gan	32.09459, 34.81931	464751	
Gad Ullman	Page Avenue, 2000	גד אולמן שדרת פייג' (שדרת דף), אבן מנוסר, 2000 אוניברסיטת בר אילן, רמת גן	Bar-Ilan University, Ramat-Gan	coordinates missing	464707	
Moshe Castel	Together the Tribes of Israel, 1987	משה קסטל יחד שבטי ישראל (תבליט קיר), 1987 בורסת היהלומים הישראלית, דרך זאב ז'בוטינסקי, רמת גן	Diamond Exchange Center, Ramat-Gan	32.08301, 34.80042	464730	
Dorit Feldman	Two Wall Sculptures, 1993	דורית פלדמן שני פסלי קיר, 1993 בורסת היהלומים הישראלית, דרך זאב ז'בוטינסקי רמת גן	Diamond Exchange Center, Ramat-Gan	coordinates missing	464852	
Menashe Kadishman	Birth, 2000	מנשה קדישמן לידה, 1993 רמת גן, מרכז רפואי שייבא, תל השומר	Sheba Medical Center, Tel Hashomer, Ramat-Gan	coordinates missing	465017	
Dani Karavan	Ohel (The Tent), 1991	דני קרוון; Ohel (The Tent), 1991 רמת גן, מרכז רפואי שייבא, תל השומר	Sheba Medical Center, Tel Hashomer, Ramat-Gan	coordinates missing	465040	
Menashe Kadishman	Trees in Negative, 1993	מנשה קדישמן עצים בתשליל, 1993 רמת גן, מרכז רפואי שייבא, תל השומר	Sheba Medical Center, Tel Hashomer, Ramat-Gan	coordinates missing	465016	
Dudu Gerstein	Bike Rider, 2003	דוד גרשטיין; Bike Rider, 2003	Topor Sculpture Garden, Ramat-Gan	coordinates missing	464897	
Menashe Kadishman	Memorial Monument for the Etzel, Haganah and Lehi Underground Organizations, 2006	he:מנשה קדישמן אנדרטת זיכרון למחתרות האצ"ל, ההגנה והלח"י, 2006 דרך אבא הלל פינת דרך בן גוריון, רמת גן	Ramat-Gan	coordinates missing	465015	

=== Ramat Ef'al ===
Artist	Title, Year	Description	Address	Coordinates	ID	Image
Noam Rabinowitz	Environmental Sculpture, 1989	נועם רבינוביץ פסל, 1989 סמינר רמת אפעל, רמת אפעל	Ramat Ef'al	coordinates missing	467549	

== Haifa District ==
=== Haifa ===
Artist	Title, Year	Description	Address	Coordinates	ID	Image
Mordechai Gumpel	Mosaic	מרדכי גומפל פסיפס,	Dagon Silo, Haifa	32.8234, 34.99527	464933	
Mordechai Gumpel	Farmers Working, 1961	מרדכי גומפל איכרים עובדים, 1961 חברת החשמל, חיפה	Electric Company, Haifa	32.83517, 34.99683	464938	
Itzhak Danziger	Kesher Hadorot ("connection between generations"), Memorial for the Pioneer of the Illegal Immigration, 1969	יצחק דנציגר קשר הדורות, אנדרטה לחלוצי העליה הבלתי חוקית, 1969 חיפה, כניסה למוזיאון חיל הים	Entrance to the Maritime Museum, Haifa	32.83, 34.97139	464748	
Dudu Gerstein	Digital Zabar, 2002	דוד גרשטיין; Digital Zabar, 2002	Waddi Nisnass, Haifa	coordinates missing	464869	
Belu Simion Fainaru	Life, 1997	בלו סימיון פיינרו פסל חיים, לזכרם של 73 הלוחמים שנספו באסון המסוקים, 1997 שדרות הנשיא ויצמן, חיפה	Hanasi Avenue, Haifa	coordinates missing	464836	
Dudu Gerstein	Colors from Nature, 2001	דוד גרשטיין; Colors from Nature, 2001 חיפה, מרכז חורב	Horev Center, Haifa	coordinates missing	464867	
Dudu Gerstein	Things that come from Haifa, 2001	דוד גרשטיין; Things that come from Haifa, 2001	Ramat Alon Park, Haifa	coordinates missing	464868	
Emanuel Sela (Blaustein)	Wall Painting	עמנואל סלע (בלוישטיין) ציור קיר, בית חולים רמב"ם, חיפה	Rambam Hospital, Haifa	32.83338, 34.98584	467697	

==== Avi Ran Sculpture Garden ====
Hebrew: לאורך טיילת מהכניסה הדרומית של חיפה (מת"מ) לכיוון טירת הכרמל (כביש מס' 4).

Artist	Title, Year	Description	Address	Coordinates	ID	Image
Guy Zagursky	Mate, 2008	גיא זגורסקי מט, 2008 גן הפסלים ע"ש אבי רן, חיפה	Avi Ran Sculpture Garden, Haifa	coordinates missing	464635	
Gal Weinstein	White Game, Black Labor, 2008	גל וינשטיין משחק לבן, עבודה שחורה, 2008 גן הפסלים ע"ש אבי רן, חיפה	Avi Ran Sculpture Garden, Haifa	coordinates missing	464649	

==== Technion - Israel Institute of Technology ====
Artist	Title, Year	Description	Address	Coordinates	ID	Image
Zvi Aldouby	The Breastplate (The Chosen), 1975	צבי אלדבי החושן, 1975 הטכניון, חיפה	Technion - Israel Institute of Technology, Haifa	coordinates missing	464345	
Yechiel Shemi	Syllables 6	יחיאל שמי, הברות 6 הטכניון, חיפה	Technion - Israel Institute of Technology, Haifa	coordinates missing	467723	
Moshe Castel	Mural Painting, 1958	משה קסטל ציור קיר, 1958 אודיטוריום צ'רציל, הטכניון, חיפה	Technion - The Churchill Auditoium, Haifa	coordinates missing	464712	

==== University of Haifa ====
Artist	Title, Year	Description	Address	Coordinates	ID	Image
Avraham Ofek	Israel: The Dream and Its End, 2008	אברהם אופק ישראל: החלום ושברו (פרט), 2008	University of Haifa, Haifa	coordinates missing	452106	Show more images of this artwork
Yaacov Dorchin	Three sculptures from the series, "Blocked Well"	יעקב דורצ'ין; 3 פסלים מהסדרה, באר אטומה, אוניברסיטת חיפה, חיפה	University of Haifa, Haifa	coordinates missing	464767	

=== Hadera ===
Artist	Title, Year	Description	Address	Coordinates	ID	Image
Emanuel Sela (Blaustein)	Wall Relief	עמנואל סלע (בלוישטיין) ציור קיר, בית הכנסת של החאן העתיק, חדרה	The synagogue of the ancient Khan, Hadera, Hadera	32.43732, 34.92311	467696	
Doron Bar Adon	Yad LaBonim	דורון בר אדון "יד לבונים", ברכת המים,	Hadera	32.43956, 34.92109	464462	

=== Kiryat Tivon ===
Artist	Title, Year	Description	Address	Coordinates	ID	Image
Yaacov Dorchin	Blocked Well	יעקב דורצ'ין באר אטומה, בית יד לבנים, רח' המגדל, גבעת הבנים,קרית טבעון	Yad Labanim Memorial Center, Kiryat Tivon	coordinates missing	464774	
Dov Feigin	Wall Relife, 1974	דב פייגין תבליט קיר בניין הדואר, קריית טבעון	Post Office building, Kiryat Tivon	coordinates missing	480790	

=== Kiryat Yam ===
Artist	Title, Year	Description	Address	Coordinates	ID	Image
Mina Sisselman	Environmental Sculpture	he:מינה זיסלמן פיסול סביבתי,	Community Centre, Kiryat Yam	coordinates missing	467752	
Dudu Gerstein	Blue Mermaid, 2003	דוד גרשטיין; Blue Mermaid, 2003 קרית ים	Kiryat Yam	coordinates missing	464888	

== Northern District ==
Artist	Title, Year	Description	Address	Coordinates	ID	Image
Dalia Meiri	Environmental Sculpture, 1979	דליה מאירי פיסול סביבתי, 1979 קיבוץ פרוד	Kibbutz Parod	32.933812, 35.43417	465183	
Batia Lishansky	In Memory of the Sons, 1956	בתיה לישנסקי "לזכר הבנים", אבן מלאכותית, 1956 בית קשת	Beit Keshet	32.71939, 35.39495	465087	
Dalia Meiri	Environmental Sculpture, 1988	דליה מאירי פיסול סביבתי, 1988 בית זרח	Beit Zerah	32.69032, 35.57416	465176	
Igael Tumarkin	The Sculpture Garden of Belvoir	יגאל תומרקין גן הפסלים בבלוואר, גן לאומי כוכב הירדן	Belvoir	32.59737, 35.5212	467582	
Noam Rabinowitz	Yochai Grove, 1984	נועם רבינוביץ חורשת יוחי, 1984 בית השיטה	Memorial Corner, Bet Hashita	32.55448, 35.44395	467547	
Noam Rabinowitz	Graduates' Wall	נועם רבינוביץ קיר המחזורים בית השיטה	Bet Hashita	32.55177, 35.43923	467548	
Zvi Aldouby	Breakthrough of the Road to the Negev Memorial, 1971	צבי אלדבי "פריצת הדרך לנגב" אנדרטה בחלץ (בטון), 1971 עין הוד	Ein Hod	32.70126, 34.9827	464343	
Noam Rabinowitz	Environmental Sculpture, 1985	נועם רבינוביץ פיסול סביבתי, 1985 גבעת הפלאחים	Givat Hafalachim	32.59817, 35.5212	467550	

=== Ein Harod ===
Artist	Title, Year	Description	Address	Coordinates	ID	Image
Avraham Ofek	Untitled, 1970s	אברהם אופק אברהם אופק, שנות השבעים המשכן לאמנות על שם חיים אתר, עין חרוד	Ein Harod Museum of Art, Kibbutz Ein Harod Meuchad	32.55774, 35.39306	480338	
Dov Feigin	Growth, 1959	דב פייגין, 1959 משכן לאמנות על שם חיים אתר, עין חרוד	Ein Harod Museum of Art, Kibbutz Ein Harod Meuchad	32.55682, 35.39291	480340	
Dalia Meiri	Environmental Sculpture, 1984	דליה מאירי פיסול סביבתי, 1984 קיבוץ עין חרוד המאוחד	Ein Harod Museum of Art	32.55774, 35.39306	465180	

=== Atlit ===
Artist	Title, Year	Description	Address	Coordinates	ID	Image
Zvi Aldouby	David Playing Before Saul, 1968	צבי אלדבי דוד מנגן לפני שאול, 1968 בית הנוער, עתלית	Youth Club, Atlit	coordinates missing	464342	
Igael Tumarkin	Window to the Sea, 1963	יגאל תומרקין חלון לים, 1963 עתלית	Atlit	coordinates missing	467584	
Yaacov Dorchin	Blocked Well	יעקב דורצ'ין באר אטומה, כביש 2, כביש חיפה-תל אביב החדשת הקילומטר ה-87	Highway 2, The New Haifa - Tel Aviv Highway, Coastal Highway	32.65833, 34.93567	464765	

=== Golan Heights ===
Artist	Title, Year	Description	Address	Coordinates	ID	Image
Ezra Orion	Monument to the fallen during the Six Day War, 1972	עזרא אוריון גלעד הנופלים במלחמת ששת-הימים ובקרבות ההתשה, 1972 מצפה גדות, רמת-הגולן	Mizpe Gadot, Golan Heights	coordinates missing	472954	
Noam Rabinowitz	Environmental Sculpture, 1990	נועם רבינוביץ פיסול סביבתי, 1990 אזור תעשייה קצרין, קצרין	Golan Wineries, Katzrin	coordinates missing	467554	

=== Kfar Uria ===
Artist	Title, Year	Description	Address	Coordinates	ID	Image
Avraham Ofek	Mural, 1970	אברהם אופק ציור קיר, 1970 בית העם, כפר אוריה	Beit Haam, Kfar Uria	coordinates missing	465286	
Dalia Meiri	Environmental Sculpture, 1981	דליה מאירי פיסול סביבתי, 1981 קיבוץ החותרים	Kibbutz Hahotrium	31.792691, 34.946852	465181	
Yaacov Dorchin	Sukkah, 1993	יעקב דורצ'ין סוכה, 1993 קיבוץ נוה אור	Kibbutz Neve Ur	coordinates missing	464773	

=== Kiryat Shmona ===
Artist	Title, Year	Description	Address	Coordinates	ID	Image
Igael Tumarkin	Big Chief, 1968	יגאל תומרקין ביג צ'יף, 1968 קריית שמונה	Kiryat Shmona	coordinates missing	464762	

=== Ma'alot-Tarshiha ===
Artist	Title, Year	Description	Address	Coordinates	ID	Image
Dalia Meiri	Water Gate	דליה מאירי שער המים,	Ma'alot-Tarshiha	coordinates missing	465184	

=== Nazareth Illit ===
Artist	Title, Year	Description	Address	Coordinates	ID	Image
Dalia Meiri	Environmental Sculpture	דליה מאירי פיסול סביבתי, נצרת עילית, גנים ציבוריים	Public Gardens, Nazareth Illit	coordinates missing	465189	
Ben Zion Kadishman	Outside Sculpture	בן ציון קדישמן המפתח לפלטה ולשד, נצרת עילית	Nazareth Illit	coordinates missing	465010	

=== Rosh Pina ===
Artist	Title, Year	Description	Address	Coordinates	ID	Image
Itzhak Danziger	The Shlomo Ben Joseph Monument, 1957	יצחק דנציגר אנדרטה לזכר שלמה בן-יוסף, 1957 ראש-פינה	Rosh Pina	coordinates missing	464757	

=== Lohamei HaGeta'ot ===
Artist	Title, Year	Description	Address	Coordinates	ID	Image
Batia Lishansky	Picture of the Holocaust, 1960	בתיה לישנסקי תמונה מהשואה, ברונזה, 1960 אגף האמנות של מוזאון בית לוחמי הגטאות, לוחמי הגטאות	Lochamei Hagetaot	coordinates missing	465096	

=== Tefen Open Museum ===
Tefen Open Museum at Tefen Industrial Park, Migdal Tefen

Artist	Title, Year	Description	Address	Coordinates	ID	Image
Ilan Averbuch	Deus Ex Machina	אילן אורבוך דאוס אקס מכינה, המוזיאון הפתוח, גן התעשייה תפן	Tefen Open Museum, Tefen Industrial Park	coordinates missing	464447	
Ilan Averbuch	Promises Promises	אילן אורבוך הבטחות הבטחות, הגליל המערבי, גן תעשיית תפן, המוזיאון הפתוח	Tefen Open Museum, Tefen Industrial Park	coordinates missing	464448	
Igael Tumarkin	Tefen, 1988	יגאל תומרקין תפן, 1988 הגליל המערבי, גן תעשיית תפן, המוזיאון הפתוח	Tefen Open Museum, Tefen Industrial Park	coordinates missing	464737	
Yaacov Dorchin	Tuba Merum, 1994	יעקב דורצ'ין טובה מרומם, 1994 הגליל המערבי, גן תעשיית תפן, המוזיאון הפתוח	Tefen Open Museum, Tefen Industrial Park	coordinates missing	464776	
Dov Feigin	Animal, 1958	דב פייגין חיה, 1958 המוזיאון הפתוח, גן התעשייה תפן	Tefen Open Museum, Tefen Industrial Park	coordinates missing	464843	
Dudu Gerstein	Ladder of Motives, 1994	דוד גרשטיין סולם מוטיבים, 1994 הגליל המערבי, גן תעשיית תפן, המוזיאון הפתוח	Tefen Open Museum, Tefen Industrial Park	coordinates missing	464901	
Dov Heller	Bougainvillea	דב הלר בוגנוויליה, המוזיאון הפתוח, גן התעשייה תפן	Tefen Open Museum, Tefen Industrial Park	coordinates missing	464987	
Eli Ilan	Sacrifice, 1972	אלי אילן; Sacrifice, 1972 המוזיאון הפתוח, גן התעשייה תפן	Tefen Open Museum, Tefen Industrial Park	coordinates missing	464999	
Menashe Kadishman	Birth, 1989	מנשה קדישמן לידה, 1989 הגליל המערבי, גן תעשיית תפן, המוזיאון הפתוח	Tefen Open Museum, Tefen Industrial Park	coordinates missing	465027	
Avraham Ofek	Homage to Asher, 1966	אברהם אופק מחווה לאשר, 1966 הגליל המערבי, גן תעשיית תפן, המוזיאון הפתוח	Tefen Open Museum, Tefen Industrial Park	coordinates missing	465293	
Noam Rabinowitz	Environmental Sculpture, 1985	נועם רבינוביץ פיסול סביבתי, 1985 הגליל המערבי, גן תעשיית תפן, המוזיאון הפתוח	Tefen Open Museum, Tefen Industrial Park	coordinates missing	467559	
Eran Shakine	Three Large Goats	ערן שאקין שלושה עיזים גדולות, הגליל המערבי, גן תעשיית תפן, המוזיאון הפתוח	Tefen Open Museum, Tefen Industrial Park	coordinates missing	467713	
Belu Simion Fainaru	Sham/There, 1996	בלו סימיון פיינרו שם, 1996 המוזיאון הפתוח, גן התעשייה תפן	Tefen Open Museum, Tefen Industrial Park	coordinates missing	473688	

=== Tel Hai ===
Artist	Title, Year	Description	Address	Coordinates	ID	Image
Micha Ullman	Sky, 1983	מיכה אולמן שמים, 1983 תל חי	Tel Hai	coordinates missing	464660	
Yaacov Dorchin	Pool with Four Fish, 1987	יעקב דורצ'ין בריכה עם 4 דגים, 1987 תל חי	Tel Hai	coordinates missing	464780	
Teicher Yekutiel	Environmental Sculpture, 1987	יקותיאל טייכר פיסול סביבתי, 1987 תל חי	Tel hai	coordinates missing	469992	
Zvi Aldouby	Yizkor (Remembrance), 1975	צבי אלדבי יזכור, 1975	Lohamei HaGetaot House, Western Galilee	32.96327, 35.09681	464356	
Doron Bar Adon	Sculpture Symposium, 1989	דורון בר אדון פסל, 1989 פארק קצרין	Park Katzrin, Ramat Hagolan	32.99276, 35.68969	464466	
Michael Gross	Memorial Site, 1980	מיכאל גרוס אתר הנצחה, 1980 עמק בית שאן, קיבוץ מסילות	Kibbutz Messilot, Beit Shean Valley	32.49912, 35.47451	464924	

== Central District ==
=== Hadera ===
Artist	Title, Year	Description	Address	Coordinates	ID	Image
Emanuel Sela (Blaustein)	Wall Relief	עמנואל סלע (בלוישטיין) ציור קיר, בית הכנסת של החאן העתיק, חדרה	The synagogue of the ancient Khan, Hadera, Hadera	32.43775, 34.92315	467696	
Doron Bar Adon	Yad Lebanim	דורון בר אדון "יד לבונים", ברכת המים,	Hadera	32.43956, 34.92109	464462	

=== Kfar Saba ===
Artist	Title, Year	Description	Address	Coordinates	ID	Image
Batia Lishansky	Hora, 1946	בתיה לישנסקי הורה, 1946 כפר הנוער אונים, רח' סולד 1, כפר סבא	Onim Institute, Kfar Saba	coordinates missing	465093	
Mina Sisselman	Environmental Sculpture	מינה זיסלמן פיסול סביבתי, קריית ספיר, רחוב ירושלים 30, כפר סבא	Sapir Centre, 30 Jerusalem St., Kfar Saba	coordinates missing	467751	
Yoel Gilinsky	Environmental Sculpture, 1994	יואל גילינסקי פיסול סביבתי, 1994	Kfar Saba	coordinates missing	464913	
Dov Feigin	Relif, 1967	דב פייגין, 1967 בית הספר אורט, רחוב אלקלעי 1, כפר-סבא	ORT School, 1 Alkalay St., Kfar Saba	coordinates missing	480342	

=== Petah Tikva ===
Artist	Title, Year	Description	Address	Coordinates	ID	Image
Dov Feigin	Growth, 1987	דב פייגין, 1987 מוזיאון פתח תקוה לאמנות, רחוב ארלוזורוב 30, פתח תקוה	Petach Tikva Museum, Petach Tikva, Petach Tikva	32.085330, 34.872690	480341	
Zvi Aldouby	Artistic Partition (wood), 1979	צבי אלדבי מחיצה אמנותית עץ, 16 מ', 1979	Ramat Chen Synagogue, Petach Tikva	coordinates missing	464352	

=== Raanana ===
Artist	Title, Year	Description	Address	Coordinates	ID	Image
Gad Ullman	Memorial Wall - Balistraria, 1993	גד אולמן קיר זכרון, "בליסטראריה" ,ברונזה ושחם, 1993 בית יד לבנים, רחוב אחוזה 147, רעננה	Beit Yad Lebanim, Raanana	coordinates missing	464709	Show more images of this artwork
Amnon (Zigi) Ben Haim	Environmental Sculpture, 1998	אמנון (זיגי) בן חיים פיסול סביבתי, 1998 פארק רעננה, רעננה	Sculpture Park, Raanana	32.1885, 34.8523	464545	Show more images of this artwork
Dudu Gerstein	Cow, 1998	דוד גרשטיין פרה, 1998 פארק רעננה, רעננה	Sculpture Park, Raanana	coordinates missing	464895	Show more images of this artwork
Motti Mizrachi	Sculpture, 1998	מוטי מזרחי פסל, 1998 פארק רעננה, רעננה	Sculpture Park, Raanana	coordinates missing	465226	Show more images of this artwork
Buky Schwartz	Zig-Zag, 1998	בוקי שוורץ זיג זג, פסל נוף מנקודת מבט, 1998 פארק רעננה, רעננה	Sculpture Park, Raanana	coordinates missing	467678	Show more images of this artwork
Yechiel Shemi	Environmental Sculpture, 1998	יחיאל שמי, 1998 פארק רעננה, רעננה	Sculpture Park, Raanana	coordinates missing	467729	Show more images of this artwork
Dalia Meiri	Dialogue with Tree Trunks	דליה מאירי שלושה פסלי "דו שיח עם גזעי עצים", רעננה	Raanana	coordinates missing	465187	Show more images of this artwork

=== Ramat Hasharon ===
Artist	Title, Year	Description	Address	Coordinates	ID	Image
Dudu Gerstein	Great Tree, 1993	דוד גרשטיין; Great Tree, 1993 רמת השרון	Ramat Hasharon	coordinates missing	464896	
Yoel Gilinsky	Environmental Sculpture, 1993	יואל גילינסקי פיסול סביבתי, 1993 רמת השרון	Ramat Hasharon	coordinates missing	464914	

=== Herzliya ===
Artist	Title, Year	Description	Address	Coordinates	ID	Image
Yaacov Dorchin	Marine Angel, 1995	יעקב דורצ'ין מלאך ימי, 1995 שדרות אבא אבן, הרצליה	Abba Eban Blvd., Herzliya	32.16428, 34.80541	464770	
Gad Ullman	The Water's Edge, 1999	גד אולמן; The Water's Edge, 1999	Assisted Living Residence Seven Stars, Herzliya	coordinates missing	464718	
Dudu Gerstein	Island of Flowers, 1996	דוד גרשטיין; Island of Flowers, 1996	Brigada Street, Herzliya	coordinates missing	464870	
Yaacov Dorchin	A Ship of Fools, 1994	יעקב דורצ'ין ספינת שוטים, פסל משותף עם יגאל תומרקין, 1994	Coastal Highway near the Scitex Bridge, Herzliya	coordinates missing	464771	
Yaacov Dorchin	Pool with Ark of Fish, 1989	יעקב דורצ'ין בריכה עם קשת דגים, 1989	Herzliya Museum, Herzliya	coordinates missing	464768	
Moshe Castel	Mural Painting, 1955	משה קסטל ציור קיר, 1955	Hotel Accadia, Herzliya	coordinates missing	464715	
Dudu Gerstein	Cats Hill, 1998	דוד גרשטיין; Cats Hill, 1998	Neve Amal, Herzliya	coordinates missing	464871	
Gad Ullman	Sea and Sun, 1989	גד אולמן "ים ושמש", ברונזה, 1989 הרצליה	Herzliya	coordinates missing	464720	
Motti Mizrachi	Mordoch, 1991	מוטי מזרחי "מורדוך", 1991 הרצליה	Herzliya	coordinates missing	465223	
Noam Rabinowitz	Environmental Sculpture, 1986	נועם רבינוביץ פיסול סביבתי, 1986 הרצליה	Herzliya	32.17184, 34.84652	467551	

=== Netanya ===
Artist	Title, Year	Description	Address	Coordinates	ID	Image
Buky Schwartz	Leonardo, 2001	בוקי שוורץ ליאונרדו, 2001 רמת פולג, נתניה	Ramat Poleg, Netanya	coordinates missing	467677	
Eran Shakine	Environmental Sculpture, 1998	ערן שאקין פיסול סביבתי, 1998	Sculpture Garden, Netanya	coordinates missing	467710	
Mina Sisselman	Environmental Sculpture	מינה זיסמלן פיסול סביבתי,	Wingate Institute, Netanya	coordinates missing	467754	
Dudu Gerstein	Sport Island, 2008	דוד גרשטיין; Sport Island, 2008	Netanya	coordinates missing	464893	

=== Netzer Sereni ===
Artist	Title, Year	Description	Address	Coordinates	ID	Image
Batia Lishansky	The Holocaust and the Revival, 1965	בתיה לישנסקי השואה והתקומה, 1965 נצר סרני	Netzer Sereni	31.92375, 34.82344	465098	
Batia Lishansky	Commemorating the Holocaust, 1967	בתיה לישנסקי השואה והתקומה, ברונזה, 1967 נצר סירני	Nezer Sereni	31.92375, 34.82344	465099	

=== Ashdod ===
Artist	Title, Year	Description	Address	Coordinates	ID	Image
Israel Hadany	Sails, 1997	ישראל הדני מפרשים, 1997	Hamarina square, Ashdod	coordinates missing	473149	
Motti Mizrachi	The Eye of The Sun, 2012	מוטי מזרחי עין השמש, 2012	HaYovel roundabout, Ashdod	31.77173, 34.62227		Show more images of this artwork

=== Holon ===
Artist	Title, Year	Description	Address	Coordinates	ID	Image
Igael Tumarkin	Sculpture Garden, 1971	יגאל תומרקין גן פסלים, 1971 רחוב ויצמן 61, חולון	61 Weizman Street, Holon	32.01601, 34.77022	467552	
Dudu Gerstein	Soul Bird, 2002	דוד גרשטיין ציפור הנפש, 2002 רחוב המעפילים פינת הלוחמים, חולון	Halochmim Street at Hama, Holon	coordinates missing	464872	
Buky Schwartz	The Giving Tree, 2002	בוקי שוורץ "העץ הנדיב", 2002 רחוב הופיין - אהרונוביץ, חולון	Lavon Park, Holon	coordinates missing	467673	
Dorit Feldman	The Fish That Did Not Wish to be a Fish, 2006	דורית פלדמן הדג שלא רצה להיות דג, 2006 רחוב מוטה גור פינת רפאל איתן, חולון	Story Gardens, Holon	coordinates missing	464849	
Itzhak Danziger	For the Fallen, 1962	יצחק דנציגר לנופלים, 1962 תאטרון חולון - בית יד לבנים, שדרות קוגל 11, חולון	Yad Lebanim Memorial, Holon	coordinates missing	464753	
Zvi Aldouby	Confrontation, 1974	צבי אלדבי עימות, 1974 גן הרצל, רחוב חומה ומגדל פינת וייצמן, חולון	Holon	coordinates missing	464346	
Jacques Jano	To Here	ז'אק ז'אנו מסע – משא גן הבנים, שדרות בן-גוריון, חולון	Holon	coordinates missing	465008	

=== Lod ===
Artist	Title, Year	Description	Address	Coordinates	ID	Image
Gad Ullman	Flight, 1980	גד אולמן "טיסה", אלומיניום., 1980	Israel Aerospace Industries, Lod	coordinates missing	464713	
Igael Tumarkin	Airport Monument	יגאל תומרקין אנדרטת התעופה, לוד	Lod	coordinates missing	464756	
Dudu Gerstein	The White Rider, 1989	דוד גרשטיין; The White Rider, 1989 לוד	Lod	coordinates missing	464889	
Dina Recanati	Environmental Sculpture, 1976	דינה רקאנטי פיסול סביבתי, 1976	Ben Gurion Airport, Lod	coordinates missing	467587	

=== Moshav Sitria ===
Artist	Title, Year	Description	Address	Coordinates	ID	Image
Chava Samuel	Ceramic Wall, 1965	חוה סמואל קיר קרמי, 1965 בית העם, מושב סתריה	Bet Haam, Moshav Satria	coordinates missing	467653	

=== Rehovot ===
Artist	Title, Year	Description	Address	Coordinates	ID	Image
Dudu Gerstein	The Flower Vase, 1995	דוד גרשטיין; The Flower Vase, 1995 רחובות, בנק לאומי	Bank Leumi, Rehovot	coordinates missing	464898	
Chava Samuel	Ceramic Wall, 1956	חוה סמואל קיר קרמי, 1956 רחובות, בנק לאומי	Bank Leumi, Rehovot	coordinates missing	467654	
Chava Samuel	קיר קרמי, 1954	חוה סמואל קיר קרמי, 1954 בית תרבות ע"ש גורדון, רחובות	Gordon Cultural Centre, Rehovot	coordinates missing	467660	
Dudu Gerstein	Scientific Orange, 1996	דוד גרשטיין; Scientific Orange, 1996	Rehovot Shopping & Central Bus Station, Rehovot	coordinates missing	464899	
Igael Tumarkin	Semaphore, 1993	יגאל תומרקין סמפור, 1993 רחובות, מכון ויצמן למדע	Weizmann Institute of Science, Rehovot	31.90977, 34.81111	464747	
Menashe Kadishman	In Suspense, 1967	מנשה קדישמן מתח, 1967 רחובות, מכון ויצמן למדע	Weizmann Institute of Science, Rehovot	coordinates missing	465020	
Menashe Kadishman	Continuum, 1979	מנשה קדישמן; Continuum, 1997 רחובות, מכון ויצמן למדע	Weizmann Institute of Science, Rehovot	coordinates missing	465021	
Dani Karavan	Memorial to Victims of the Holocaust, 1972	דני קרוון אנדרטה לזכר קורבנות השואה, 1972 רחובות, מכון ויצמן למדע	Weizmann Institute of Science, Rehovot	31.908266666667, 34.81856	465042	
Dina Recanati	Ascent, 1985	דינה רקאנטי; Ascent, 1985 רחובות, מכון ויצמן למדע	Weizmann Institute of Science, Rehovot	31.90977, 34.81111	467591	
Buky Schwartz	Altars and Water Channels	בוקי שוורץ מזבחות ומובילי מים, מכון ויצמן למדע, רחובות	Weizmann Institute of Science, Rehovot	31.90977, 34.81111	467679	
Dov Feigin	Memorial to Fallen of War of Independence, 1949	דב פייגין זיכרון לחללי מלחמת העצמאות, 1949 רחוב הבנים, רחובות	Rehovot	coordinates missing	464838	

=== Rishon LeZion ===
Artist	Title, Year	Description	Address	Coordinates	ID	Image
Chava Samuel	Ceramic Wall, 1964	חוה סמואל ללא כותרת, 1964 בית יד לבנים, ראשון לציון	Beit Yad Labanim, Rishon LeZion	coordinates missing	467655	
Chava Samuel	Ceramic Wall, 1973	חוה סמואל קיר קרמי, 1973 ראשון לציון, כניסה ליקב	Entrance to Winery, Rishon LeZion	coordinates missing	467656	
Chava Samuel	Sculptures for Fish Pond	חוה סמואל פסלים לבריכת דגים,	German Immigrants Club, Rishon LeZion	coordinates missing	467657	
Gad Ullman	Images Openings, 1994	גד אולמן דימויים פתחים, רעף חרסינה, 1994	Meromei Village, Rishon LeZion	coordinates missing	464705	
Nahum Tevet	Silent water, 2008	נחום טבת מים שקטים, 2008 גן פסלים, רח' המתנחלים מס' 14, סביון	Savyon	coordinates missing	453422	
Batia Lishansky	Lord Melchett, 1931	בתיה לישנסקי לורד מלצ'ט, 1931 תל מונד	Tel Mond	coordinates missing	465101	
Gad Ullman	Donors Wall, 1997	גד אולמן קיר התורמים, נחושת עם פטינה, 1997 בית החולים אסף הרופא, צריפין	Assaf Harofeh, Tzrifin	coordinates missing	464678	
Batia Lishansky	In Memory of the Sons, 1948	בתיה לישנסקי לזכר הבנים, 1948 כפר יהושע	Kfar Yehoshua	32.68591, 35.15144	465094	
Batia Lishansky	Work and Protection, 1930	בתיה לישנסקי עבודה והגנה, 1930 קיבוץ חולדה	Kibbutz Hulda	31.83287, 34.88155	465095	
Ilan Averbuch	Harp, Sea and Whispering Wind, 1989	אילן אורבוך נבל, ים, והרוח החרישית, 1989 פארק צ'ארלס קלור, תל אביב-יפו	Charles Clore Park	32.06303, 34.76049	282902	
Siona Shimshi	Orchard of Houses	ציונה שמשי בוסתן בתים,	Chen regional neighborhood	32.1266, 34.7922	282947	
Israel Zvika Kantor	The Ambition Sculpture, 1989	צביקה קנטור פסל האמביציה, 1989 פארק דרום	Darom Park	32.04206, 34.80306	282942	
Batia Lishansky	In Memory of the Three, 1957	בתיה לישנסקי "לזכר השלושה" אבן מלאכותית, 1957 עינת	Einat	32.08367, 34.9373	465088	
Igael Tumarkin	Homage to Jerusalem, 1971	יגאל תומרקין מחווה לירושלים, 1971 גבעת שפירא	Israel, Givat Shapira	32.35807, 34.87584	467571	

== Southern District ==
=== Arad ===
Artist	Title, Year	Description	Address	Coordinates	ID	Image
Mina Sisselman	Environmental Sculpture	מינה זיסלמן פיסול סביבתי, ערד	Community Centre, Arad	coordinates missing	467749	
Igael Tumarkin	Mitzpe Moav	יגאל תומרקין מצפור ערד, ערד	Mitzpe Mo'av, Arad	31.26065, 35.24227	469994	
Israel Hadany	Gate to the Desert, 1991	ישראל הדני השער למדבר, 1991 טיילת הפסלים, ערד	Sculpture Promenade, Arad	coordinates missing	473152	
Israel Hadany	Frame of Mind, 1991	ישראל הדני; Frame of Mind, 1991 ערד	Arad	coordinates missing	464954	
Igael Tumarkin	Panorama	יגאל תומרקין פנורמה, ערד	Arad	coordinates missing	469993	

=== Ashkelon ===
Artist	Title, Year	Description	Address	Coordinates	ID	Image
Dudu Gerstein	Surnise, 2005	דוד גרשטיין; Surnise, 2005 אשקלון	High School, Ashkelon	coordinates missing	464866	
Igael Tumarkin	Sundial Garden, 1972	יגאל תומרקין שעון שמש, 1972 אשקלון	Ashkelon	coordinates missing	467589	

=== Beersheba ===
Artist	Title, Year	Description	Address	Coordinates	ID	Image
Mina Sisselman	Environmental Sculpture	מינה זיסלמן פיסול סביבתי, באר שבע	Kindergarten, Beersheba	coordinates missing	467750	
Dani Karavan	Ha Negev Brigade Monument, 1968	דני קרוון אנדרטת חטיבת הנגב, 1968 באר שבע	Beersheba	31.26666, 34.8206	465038	Show more images of this artwork

=== Dimona ===
Artist	Title, Year	Description	Address	Coordinates	ID	Image
Emanuel Sela (Blaustein)	Wall Relief	עמנואל סלע (בלוישטיין) יציקת בטון,	Comprehensive School, Dimona	coordinates missing	467695	
Igael Tumarkin	Age of Science	יגאל תומרקין עידן המדע, דימונה	Dimona	coordinates missing	467572	

=== Eilat ===
Artist	Title, Year	Description	Address	Coordinates	ID	Image
Gad Ullman	King Shlomo Hotel, 1982	גד אולמן, 1982	King Shlomo Hotel, Eilat	29.55334, 34.96235	464726	
Gad Ullman	Neptune God and the Water, 1981	גד אולמן "נפטון, אלוהי המים", 1981 מלון רימונים (לשעבר מלון נפטון), אילת	Neptune Hotel, Eilat	29.55315, 34.96526	464724	
Gad Ullman	Climbing Birds, 2000	גד אולמן "טיפוס ציפורים", נחושת, פליז, ואלפאקה, 2000 מלון רויאל גרדן, אילת	Royal Garden Hotel, Eilat	29.5514, 34.96253	464723	

=== Ein Bokek ===
Artist	Title, Year	Description	Address	Coordinates	ID	Image
Buky Schwartz	Dead Sea Sculpture, 1986	בוקי שוורץ "פסל ים המלח", 1986 עין בוקק	Ein Bokek	coordinates missing	467671	

=== Ein Gedi ===
Artist	Title, Year	Description	Address	Coordinates	ID	Image
Doron Bar Adon	Road Sculpture, 1971	דורון בר אדון "פסל דרך" מצפון לעין גדי, 1971	North of Ein Gedi, Ein Gedi	coordinates missing	464461	
Doron Bar Adon	Concrete Reliefs	דורון בר אדון; 7 תבליטי בטון, בנין המועצה ואולם המופעים,	Cultural Centre, Eshkol	coordinates missing	464463	
Igael Tumarkin	For the Fallen	יגאל תומרקין לנופלים, בקעת הירדן	Jordan Valley	coordinates missing	281891	
Igael Tumarkin	Angel of History	יגאל תומרקין מלאך ההיסטוריה, בקעת הירדן	Jordan Valley	coordinates missing	281899	
Zvi Aldouby	Separated Parchment Scrolls, 1970	צבי אלדבי "גוילים פרושים", (ברונזה)., 1970	Synagogue Courtyard, Kiryat Gat	coordinates missing	464351	

=== Mitzpe Ramon Desert Sculpture Park ===
Artist	Title, Year	Description	Address	Coordinates	ID	Image
Dov Feigin	Stacked Pillar	דב פייגין; Stacked Pillar, מצפה רמון, פרק פסלים מדברי	Desert Sculpture Park, Mitzpe Ramon	30.61178, 34.80789	464837	
Dov Feigin	Desert Megalith	דב פייגין; Desert Megalith, מצפה רמון, פרק פסלים מדברי	Desert Sculpture Park, Mitzpe Ramon	30.61178, 34.80789	464844	
Dov Heller	Flat Stone Grid	דב הלר; Flat Stone Grid, פארק לפיסול מדברי, מצפה רמון	Desert Sculpture Park, Mitzpe Ramon	30.61178, 34.80789	464985	
Ezra Orion	Untitled, 1962	עזרא אוריון ללא כותרת, 1962 מצפה רמון, פרק פסלים מדברי	Desert Sculpture Park, Mitzpe Ramon	30.61178, 34.80789	465302	
Noam Rabinowitz	Cable Tower	נועם רבינוביץ שילוב עמוד מתח עליו בסביבתו, מצפה רמון, פרק פסלים מדברי	Desert Sculpture Park, Mitzpe Ramon	30.61178, 34.80789	467556	
Noam Rabinowitz	Untitled (stone path), 1988	נועם רבינוביץ; Untitled (stone path), 1988 מצפה רמון, פרק פסלים מדברי	Desert Sculpture Park, Mitzpe Ramon	30.61178, 34.80789	467557	
Ezra Orion	Desert Sculpture Park	עזרא אוריון; Desert Sculpture Park, מצפה רמון, פרק פסלים מדברי	Desert Sculpture Park, Mitzpe Ramon	30.61178, 34.80789	470759	

=== Other ===
Artist	Title, Year	Description	Address	Coordinates	ID	Image
Micha Ullman	Lot's Wife, 1984	מיכה אולמן אשת לוט, 1984 הר סדום, ישראל	Mount Sodom	31.12115, 35.40299	464664	
Dov Heller	Environmental Sculpture	דב הלר פיסול סביבתי, הר סדום, ישראל	Mount Sodom	31.12115, 35.40299	464986	
Mina Sisselman	Environmental Sculpture	מינה זיסלמן פיסול סביבתי, נחל צין	Phosphates Plant, Nahal Zin	30.61003, 34.80411	467753	
Dudu Gerstein	Six Sculptures, 1992	דוד גרשטיין; Six Sculptures, 1992 נגב, אתר עבודות ארכאולוגי אבדת	Avdat Archeological Site, Negev	coordinates missing	464891	
Gad Ullman	Transit Camp Darkness of Or Yehuda, 1998	גד אולמן מחנה מעבר- חשכה של אור יהודה, 1998 אודיטוריום, אור יהודה	Auditorium, Or Yehuda	coordinates missing	464711	
Mina Sisselman	Environmental Sculpture	מינה זיסלמן פיסול סביבתי,	Religious School, Yavne	coordinates missing	467755	
Dudu Gerstein	Ohel Moed, 2007	דוד גרשטיין אוהל מועד, 2007	The Sculpture Road, Hatzerim	31.23644, 34.70444	464892	
Teicher Yekutiel	Environmental Sculpture, 1988	יקותיאל טייכר פיסול סביבתי, 1988	Sdot Ravadim	31.77491, 34.81469	469991	
Yemima Ergas	Ceramic Mural	ימימה ארגז קיר קרמיקה,	Cultural Centre, Moshav Aminadav	31.75240, 35.14247	464832	
Yaacov Dorchin	Chariot, 2002	יעקב דורצ'ין מרכבה, 2002	Ness Ziona	31.93789, 34.80297	464775	
Dorit Feldman	Wall Sculpture, 1994	דורית פלדמן פסל קיר עבור בנייני דירות, 1994	Ness Ziona	31.93789, 34.80297	464851	
Noam Rabinowitz	Environmental Sculpture	נועם רבינוביץ פיסול סביבתי,	Border Station, Nitzana	30.88705, 34.4218	467558	

=== The Open Museum, Omer Industrial Park ===
Artist	Title, Year	Description	Address	Coordinates	ID	Image
Ilan Averbuch	Berlin Dome, 1994	אילן אורבוך כיפת ברלין, 1994 עומר, המוזיאון הפתוח, גן תעשיית עומר	The Open Museum, Omer Industrial Park, Omer	31.26955, 34.83626	464441	

== See also ==
- National Register of Historic Places listings in Israel, in Hebrew. Created for "Wiki Loves Monuments 2012" Israeli project link
- A list of Israeli Outdoor Artwork compiled for Wiki Loves Monuments 2012 competition by the Information Center for Israeli Art, (Hebrew).
- Wiki Loves Public Art in Israel 2013 project site
