= Dina Recanati =

Israeli sculptor (1928–2021)

- דינה רקנאטי
- Born: Diane Hettena; 1928; Cairo, Egypt
- Died: 5 June 2021 (aged 93); Herzliya Pituah, Israel
- Occupation: sculptor

Dina Recanati (Hebrew: דינה רקנאטי; born Diane Hettena; 1928 – 5 June 2021) was an Israeli artist, sculptor and painter.

== Biography ==
Diane Hettena was born in Cairo, Egypt. In 1946, she married Raphael Recanati in Tel Aviv, Mandatory Palestine.

Recanati created installations, silkscreen prints, reliefs, and tapestries.

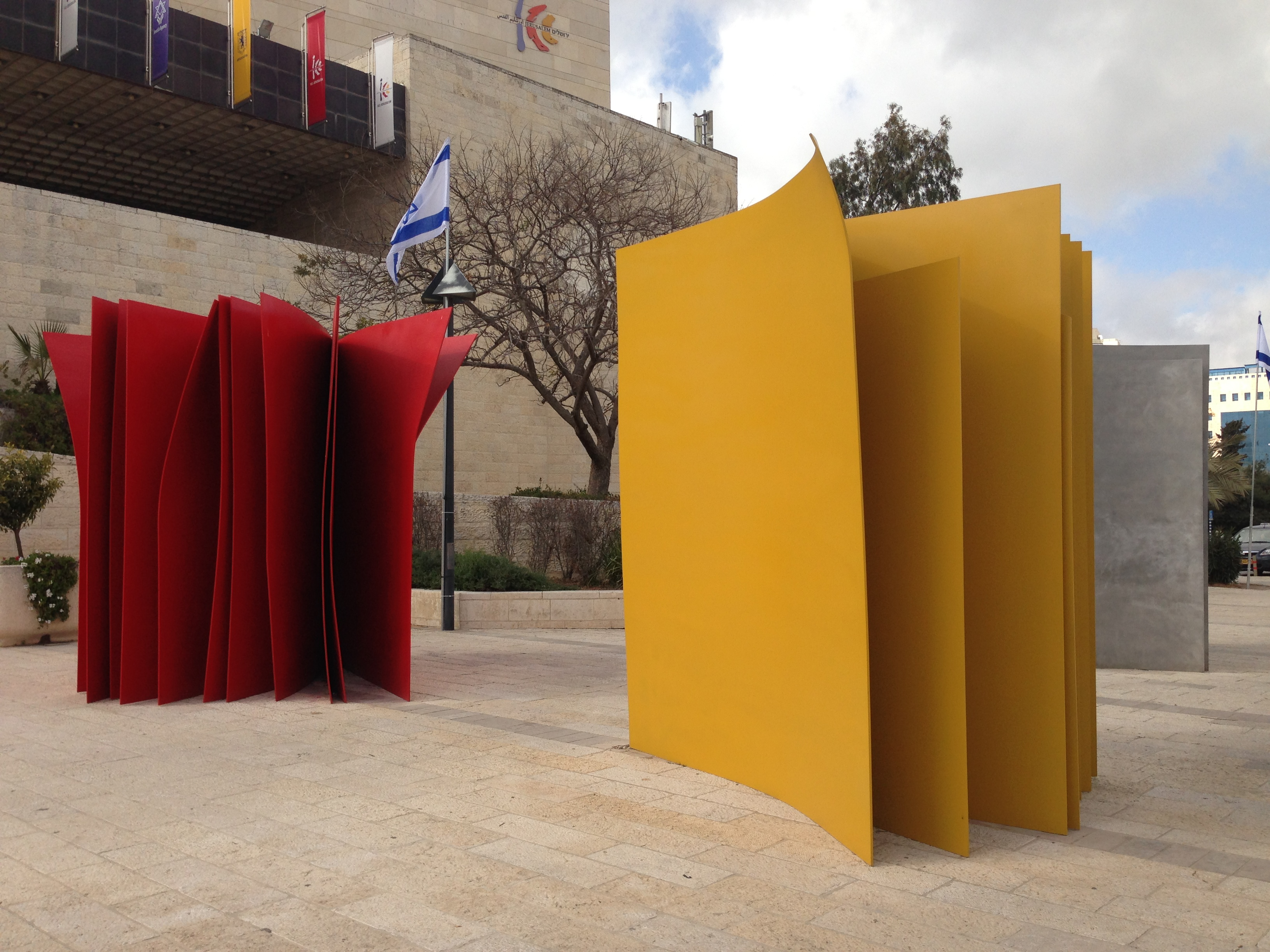
"Things" by Dina Recanati

Recanati died in Herzliya Pituah at the age of 93.

== See also ==
- List of public art in Israel
- Women of Israel
