= Eran Shakine =

Israeli artist and sculptor (born 1962)

- ערן שקין
- Born: 19 February 1962 (age 64); Tel Aviv, Israel
- Education: Tel Aviv University; École des Beaux-Arts, Paris
- Occupations: Artist; painter; illustrator; sculptor
- Notable work: Sunny Side Up; Good Help Is Hard To Find; Graffiti Girl; A Muslim, a Christian and a Jew
- Children: 3
- Parents: Shimon Shakine (father); Esther Shakine (mother)
- Awards: Art Matters Foundation Fellowship (1989–1990)

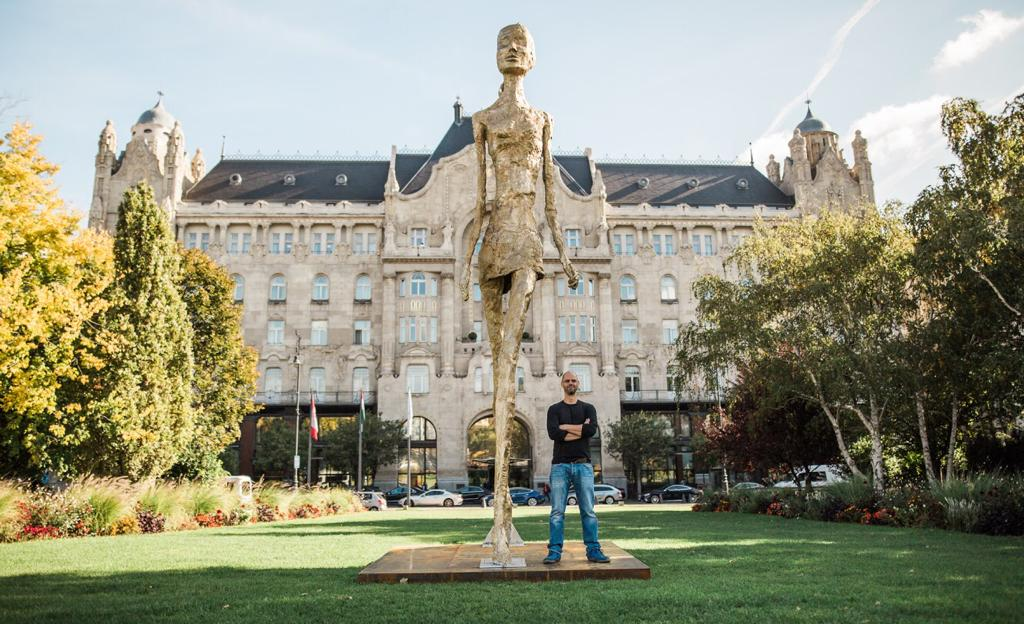
Eran next to his Buda girl

Eran Shakine (Hebrew: ערן שקין; born 19 February 1962) is an Israeli artist, painter, illustrator and sculptor.

== Biography ==
Shakine was born in Tel Aviv to Shimon (writer) and Esther (designer), holocaust survivors who immigrated to Israel after World War II. In 1980, he graduated from WIZO-France High School of Arts, in Tel Aviv. On his recruitment to the IDF in 1980, he joined the Nahal Command and served as a graphic designer. In 1983 he studied Art History at Tel Aviv University and in 1984 began his studies at the art school École des Beaux-Arts in Paris.

Between the years 1986–1993, Shakine lived in New York, where he was granted fellowship of "Art Matters" and was the assistant to CoBrA avant-garde movement artist, Karl Appel. From 1997 to 2001, Shakine lived in London.

In his works, Shakine creates bold portraits which present prominent culture figures in unusual situations and contexts, among them: Freud dozing in his famous armchair, Picasso frying an egg; Pete Mondrian crossing the ocean in dog paddle swimming style.

Shakine's Solo exhibitions were presented in New York, London, Paris, Toronto, the Israel Museum in Jerusalem, Tel Aviv Museum of Art, Museum of Israeli Art in Ramat Gan, Herzliya Museum, the Gallery of New York University, Newton Center in Boston, Corcoran art museum in Washington, D.C., Forum Museum in St. Louis, the Jewish Museum in Berlin, the Jewish Museums in Munich and in Brussels.

His works are displayed in the permanent collection of the "British Museum" in London, the Ludwig Museum in Germany, Tel Aviv Museum of Art, Israel Museum, Tefen Open Museum, Herzliya Museum and Ein Harod Museum.

In 2014, Shakine presented, for the first time at the Haifa Museum, his solo exhibition "Culture Hero" through which he tried to figure out how culture heroes are created. The exhibition: Three Painters, a rock star, a young girl and a psychoanalyst in one room, was presented in early 2016 at MANA Center for Contemporary Art in New Jersey and at Haifa Museum of Art. In 2017, Shakine exhibited a large solo exhibition at the Jewish Museum in Berlin, (Germany).

Shakine's art always engages in the same subject, even though his artworks look different from one another.

== Personal life ==
Shakine is married with three children and lives in Tel Aviv.

== His books ==
- Sunny Side Up, Hirmer publishing house, July 2011
- Good Help Is Hard To Find, self publishing, June 2011
- Graffiti Girl, Hirmer publishing house, May 2014
- A Muslim, a Christian and a Jew, Hirmer publishing house, October 2016

== Awards ==
- 1989–1990 – Art Matters Foundation: a non-profit private foundation supporting original and contemporary artists.
- 2004 – Portraits painting on the facade of the Tel Aviv Municipality building.

== Exhibitions ==
=== Solo exhibitions ===
- 2011 – "Good Help Is Hard To Find…”
- 2012 – "Sunny Side Up
- 2014 – "Graffiti Girl
- 2016 – "Looking at You / Talking To Myself"
- 2016 – "Three Painters, A Rock Star, A Young Girl and a Psychoanalyst in One Room"
- 2016 – "A Muslim A Christian and a Jew

=== Art in the public space ===
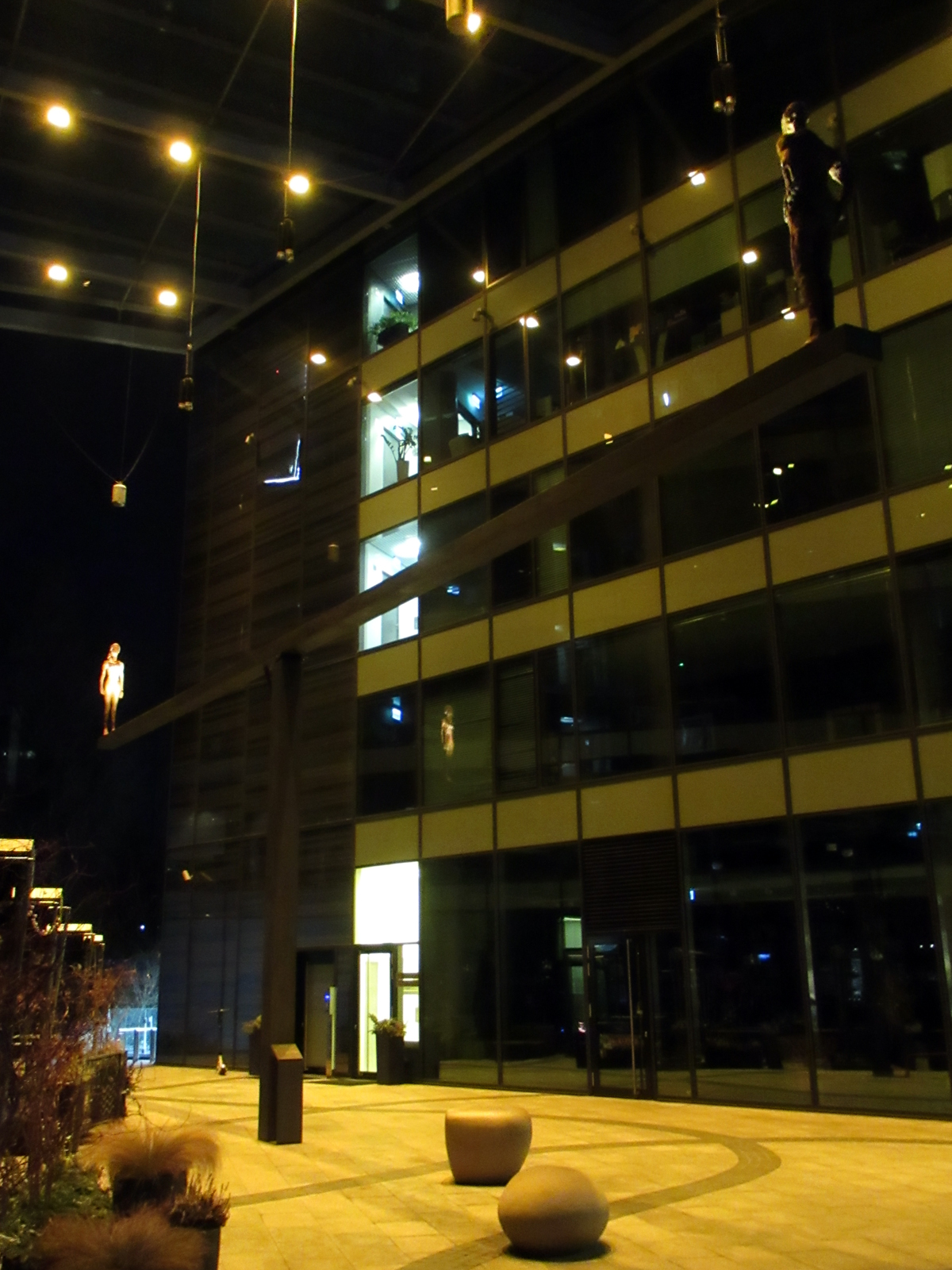
"You and me", 2015

- Gan Kinneret, Kfar Saba
- College of Management, Rishon Lezion
- The Cliff Park, (Gan Hatsuk) Netanya
- Ashdod Park, Ashdod
- Artists' House, Tel Aviv
- Rothschild Boulevard, Tel Aviv
- The Plaza Tower Museum, Tel Aviv
- "You and Me", Cosmopolitan, Warsaw
- Rothschild Tower, Richard Meier
- Girl from buda, Budapest
- Billboard project, Munich

=== Group exhibitions ===
Year	Exhibition
2011	VENICE MÉMOIRE
2012	SUMMER SHOW
2015	CONCRETE FANTASY
2015	SPECIAL PROJECT STUDIOS
2015	SUMMER SHOW
2016	40,30,20
2016	TOPOGRAPHY
2016	SPRING BREAK
2017	HOMECOMING
2017	ALTERNATIVE
2017	SUMMER SHOW
2017	TOP OF THE POP
2017	POP PORN
2017	FRENCH SALON

=== Art fairs ===
Year	Name
2018 2017 2016 2015 2014 2013	ART STAGE SINGAPORE
2017 2016 2015	ART MIAMI
2017 2016 2015 2014 2013 2012	ART TORONTO
2017, 2016 2015	ART NEW YORK
2017 2016 2014 2013	FRESH PAINT
2017 2016 2015	ART CENTRAL HONG KONG
2014	SAATCHI GALLERY
2014 2013 2012	PULSE NEW YORK
2013	ART SOUTHAMPTON
2012	CONTEXT ART MIAMI
2012	ART PLATFORM L. A
2012	SH CONTEMPORARY
2012	ART HAMPTONS
2012	SF FINE ART FAIR
2011	PLUSE LOS ANGELES
