= Ezra Orion =

Israeli sculptor (1934–2015)

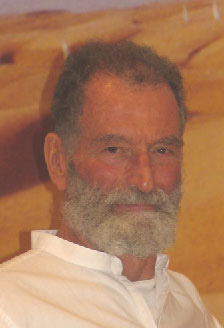
Ezra Orion

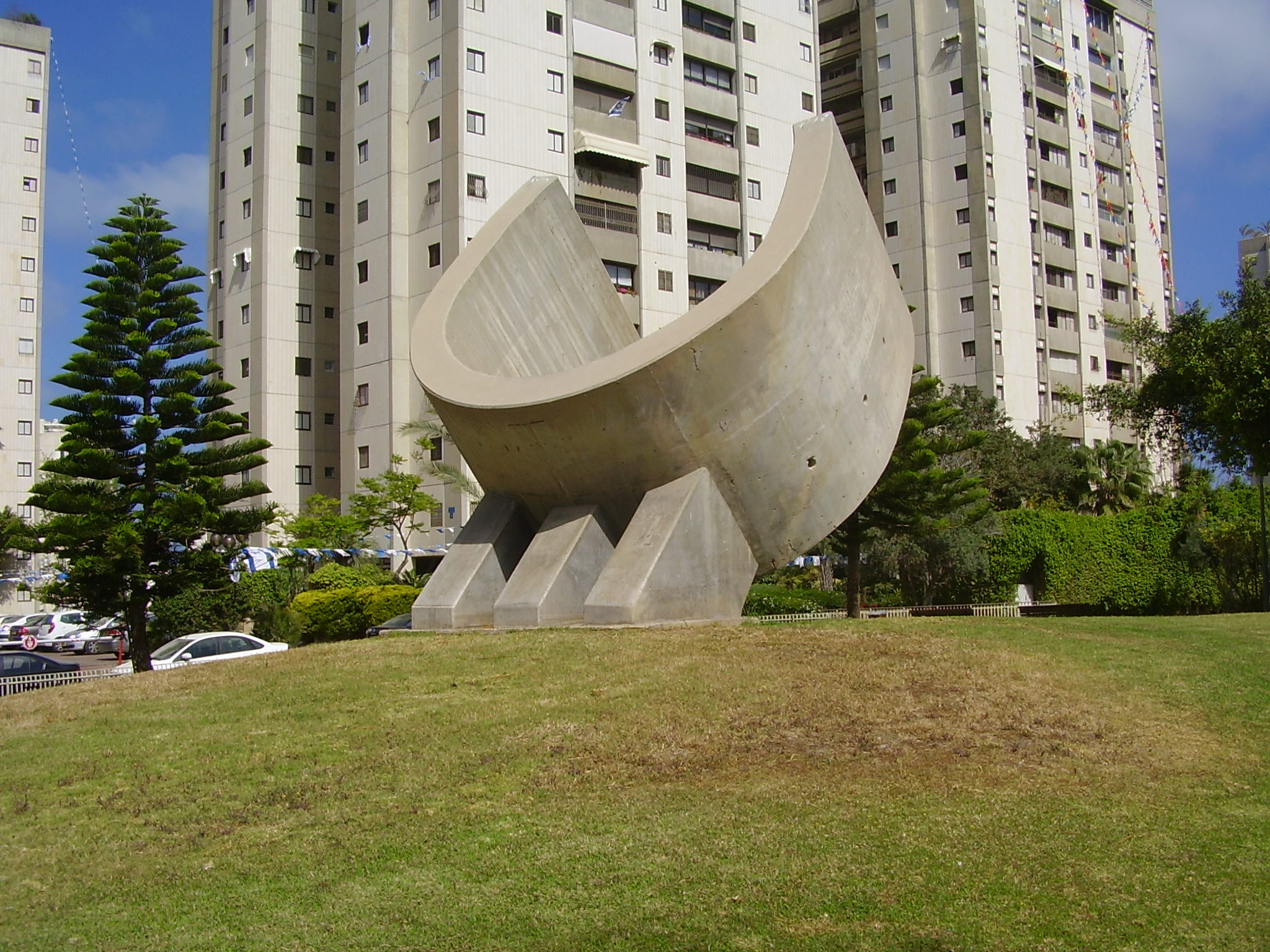
Tilted power field by Ezra Orion, Ramat Aviv

Ezra Orion (Hebrew: עזרא אוריון; 1934–2015) was an Israeli sculptor.

== Biography ==
Ezra Orion was born on Kibbutz Beit Alfa in Mandatory Palestine. The family moved to Kibbutz Ramat Yohanan when he was five. In 1952, he attended the Bezalel Academy of Art and Design in Jerusalem but left after a year of studies to enlist in the Israel Defense Forces. From 1964 to 1967, he attended the Central Saint Martins College of Art and Design and the Royal College of Art in London.

Orion lived and worked at Midreshet Ben-Gurion in Sde Boker. Orion describes his geologic structures as “launching pads” for the mind. In the late 1980s, he executed an "Intergalactic Sculpture" by sending a Laser beam to the Milky Way under the auspices of the Israeli Space Agency and the Israel Museum.
