= Israel Hadany =

Israeli environment artist and sculptor

Israel Hadany (Hebrew: ישראל הדני, Israel ha-Dani; born 1941) is an Israeli environment artist, sculptor and jewelry designer, internationally acknowledged. He is involved with poetry writing as well.

== Biography ==
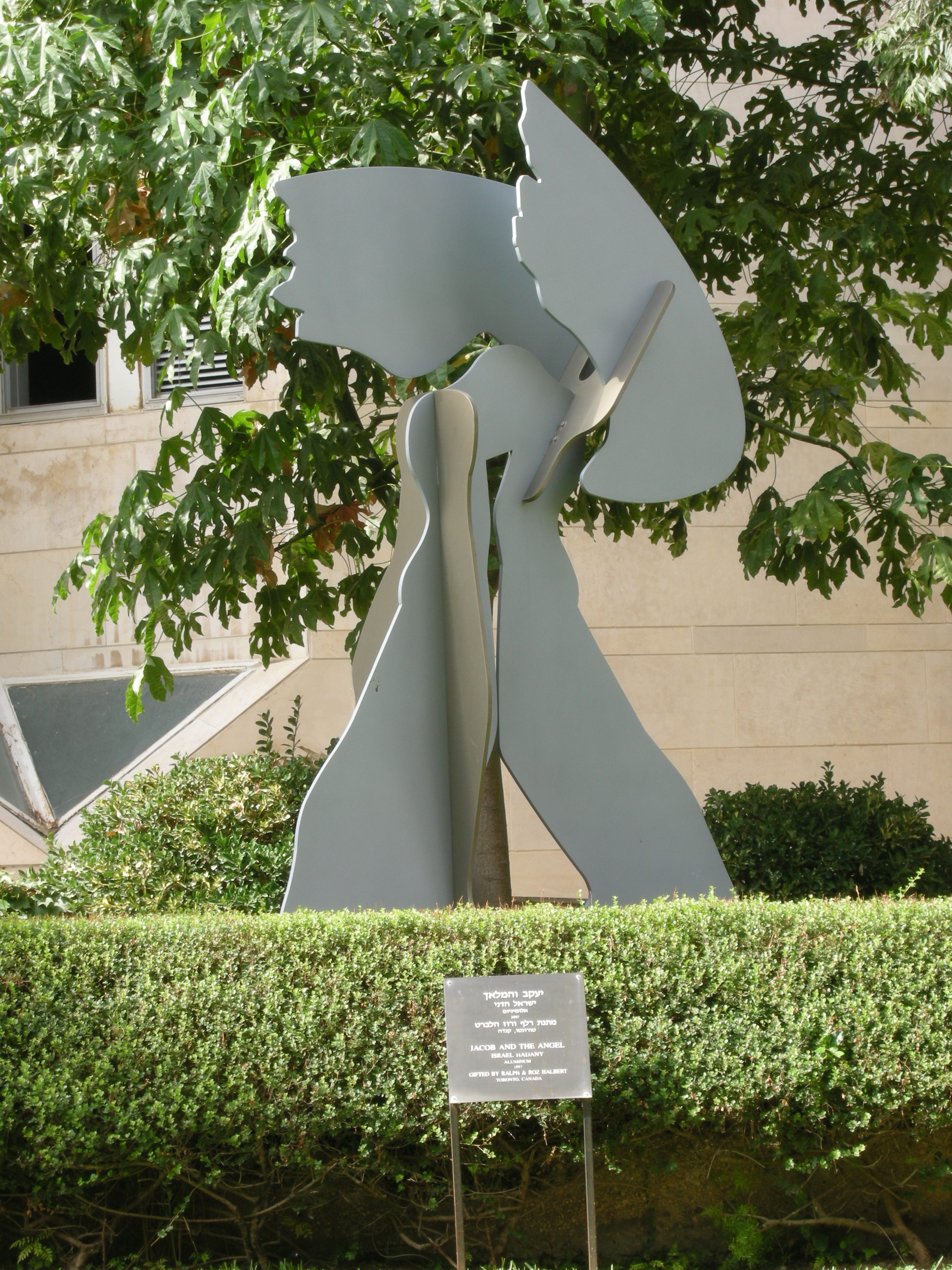
Sculpture by Hadani on Mount Scopus

=== Early life ===
Born in Beit HaShita kibutz. During his childhood, his family moved several times, first to Ayelet Hashahar kibbutz, later to Kfar Ganim (nearby Petah Tikva) and finally to Jerusalem.

In 1955, at the age of 14, he left his family and joined kibbutz Degania alone.

=== Artistic studies and career ===
1956-1957 At the age of 15, he started his art studies at the Avni Institute in Tel Aviv, taking evening courses while continuing his high school learning during the daytime. He was the youngest student in the institute among other mature students. He focused on drawing and painting studies and was deeply involved in his art. Later, he returned there but soon realized that painting wouldn't be enough for his artistic and personal aspirations.

1965 - 1967 He turned to post graduate studies at Hornsey College of Art, London.

The years in London influenced deeply his art. His confrontation with monumental ancient civilization's art in the British Museum was highly influential and left a significant imprint on his art. He often mentions a monumental sculpture from the Easter Islands. At Hornsey College, he focused mainly on sculpture.

Several years after his return to Israel (1971), he was invited to teach sculpture and design at Bezalel Academy of Art and Design.

1972 Hadany Represented Israel at the in hadany "Venice Biennale", Italy.

After this year, he did not return to teaching.

Hadany often collaborates in his art with architects and thinkers and creates environmental works of art.

1975 He works with Taller de Arquitectura of Ricardo Bofill. Barcelona .

1981-1982 created the first artonomic system in sculpture.

1983 Represents Israel at the International Symposium on Outdoor Sculpture in Yorkshire.

2000 Among the five finalists in the international competition of Martin Luther King National Memorial Project Washington.

2001 Guest artist at the International Sculpture Symposium, Carrara.

2005 Awarded an honorary doctoral degree by Monmouth University, New Jersey.

== Public Works ==
1973 Sculpture, Eshkol Park, Dimona.

1975 Glass Sculpture, Beit Yad Lebanim, Jerusalem.

1977 Memorial Sculpture, Ben Gurion Airport .

1978 Hadany Arch, road sculpture. Williamsport, Pennsylvenia.

1984 Arthur Rubinstein Memorial Sculpture, Aminadav Forest, Israel.

1985 Sky Pool, The Open Museum, Tefen, Israel.

1987 Sky Pool, The Israel Museum Sculpture Garden.

1988 Light Tower, Virginia Center for the Creative Arts, Sweet Briar, Virginia.

1990 Gate to Peace, Ben Gurion University, Beersheba, Israel.

1992 Environmental Sculpture, Mitzpe Ramon, Israel.

2005 Oasis, Environmental Sculpture, Northern entrance Beersheba.

You Who Bear Memories of All Times, Outdoor sculpture, Prague

1998 Daniel in the Lions' Den. the Open Museum, Tefen.

1998 The Shrine of Trees, the National Library, Hebrew University, Jerusalem.

2001 Here lies the dove's shadow.Carrara.

2016 The Blue System. Har Hotzvim Jerusalem

Hadany's art is concerned with the sublime and the transcendental, often allusive of ancient monumental Egyptian and Assyrian art. Most of his earlier three-dimensional works were geometrical and minimalistic. But after he visited India in 2005, his art underwent a deep change and was opened to new directions. For instance, his artistic environment in Beersheba, Oasis, is colourful and rich in shapes.

== Individual shows ==
2004 " Visual Memories" The Open Museum Tefen. Israel.

== Grants and awards ==
1970 Kolliner Prize for Young Artist, Israel Museum.

1974 First prize for the design of the memorial site of Paula and David Ben Gurion in Sde Boker

Share grant for further studies in Europe

1978 First prize for the design of the Mediterranean art center Theoulone Sur Mer in southern France.

1980 The Jerusalem Prize of Art.

2000 Among the finalists in the contest for the Martin Luther King Memorial

2012 Dan Sendel Prize by Tel Aviv Museum of Art.

== Sources ==
- Meir Ronen, The building blocks, The Jerusalem Post 5/7/1985
- Meir Ronen, Jewelry of Sculpture, The Jerusalem Post 3/3/1989
- Miriam Yizrael "שמים בקרקעית העולם פסלי ישראל הדני"

"Sky in the bottom of the world", Studio, October 1990

- Gilad Meltzer, "Like an Archeologic site" Yediot Ahronot 12/3/2004
- Israel Hadany "In Search of the Sacred" (exhibition catalogue. article by Gideon Ofrat)
