= Erez Israeli =

Israeli artist (born 1974)

Erez Israeli ארז ישראלי
- Born: 1974 (age 51–52); Beer Sheva, Israel
- Education: Bezalel Academy of Art and Design, Art School Midrasha
- Known for: Sculpture, Installation Art
- Movement: Israeli art, Modern Art

Erez Israeli (Hebrew: ארז ישראלי; born 1974) is an Israeli artist, specializing in Sculpture and Installation Art. Israeli lives and works in Tel Aviv.

== Biography ==
Israeli graduated from Midrasha Art School of Beit Berl College. He received a post-graduate degree from the Bezalel Academy of Art and Design in 2005. In his works, Israeli emphasizes the idea of preserving Israel identity - collective as well as personal. He thinks about war, terror, religious freedom - the main tensions existing in Israeli society and creates a visual concept around them.

== Exhibitions ==
=== Solo ===
- 2019 Black Milk, Künstlerhaus Bethanien, Berlin
- 2017 Die klare Sonne bringt’s an den Tag, Galerie Crone, Vienna
- 2015 The Difference Between OOOOH and AAAAH, Galerie Crone, Berlin
- 2014 Firewall Mural, a wall painting project on the Künstlerhaus Bethanien, Berlin
- 2013 Berlin 2013, Givon Art Gallery, Tel Aviv
- 2012 Lowland, Givon Art Gallery, Tel Aviv
- 2012 Erez Israeli – Prints, Tel Aviv Museum of Art
- 2010 Erez Israeli: Ashpara, Tel Aviv Museum of Art
- 2009 Friday Night, Givon Art Gallery, Tel Aviv
- 2007 Love Song, Emergency Exit New Media Center, Haifa Museum of Art
- 2003 21 Self Exhibitions, Herzliya Museum of Contemporary Art

=== Group ===
- Israel Museum

=== Awards ===
- 2005 Isracard and Tel Aviv Museum of Art Prize for an Israeli Artist
- 2005 The Rich Foundation Award for Education, Culture and Welfare, Bezalel Academy of Art and Design
- 2006 Young Artist Award, Ministry of Science, Culture and Sport
- 2006 The Hadassah and Rafael Klatchkin Prize for Art, America-Israel Cultural Foundation
- 2007 The Legacy Heritage Fund Prize, Tel Aviv Museum of Art
- 2009 The Dan Sandel and Sandel Family Foundation Sculpture Award, Tel Aviv Museum of Art
