= Eli Ilan =

Israeli sculptor

- אלי אילן
- Born: 1928; Winnipeg, Manitoba, Canada
- Died: January 1, 1982 (aged 54); Caesarea, Israel
- Education: University of British Columbia; Hebrew University of Jerusalem; Ontario College of Art & Design
- Known for: Sculpture
- Notable work: Dolmenic Arch I (1981), Tel Aviv University

Eli Ilan (Hebrew: אלי אילן; 1928 – 1982) was an Israeli sculptor.

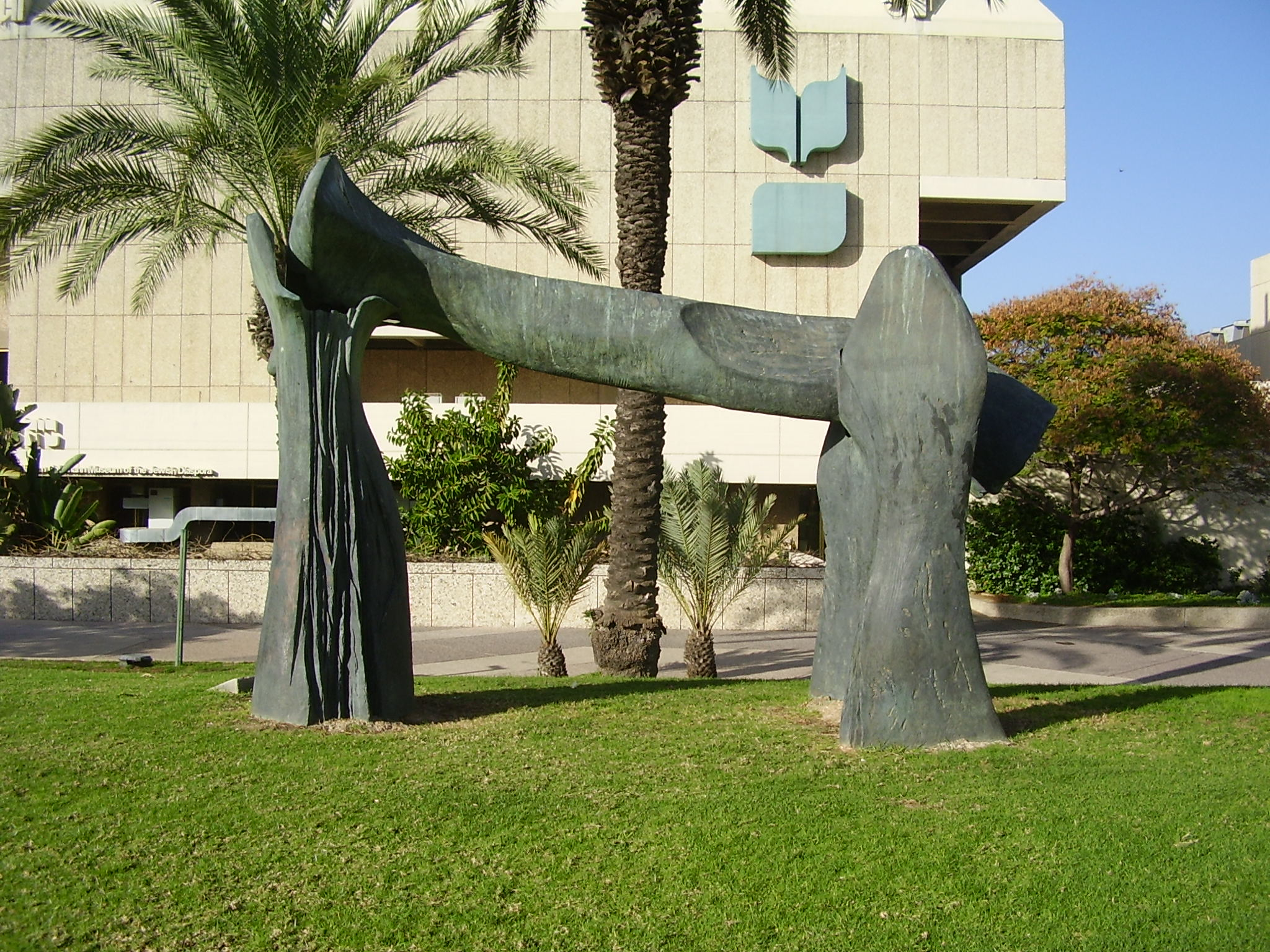
'Dolmenic Arch I' (1981), Tel Aviv University

Ilan was born in Winnipeg, Manitoba. He enrolled in a premedical curriculum at the University of British Columbia in Vancouver and emigrated to Israel in 1948. He then studied pre-historic archaeology and physical anthropology at the Hebrew University of Jerusalem. In 1956, he returned to Canada to study sculpture at the Ontario College of Art & Design. He lived in Kibbutz Sasa from 1959 to 1963. He died in 1982 in Caesarea, Israel.

== Sources ==
- Dagon, Yoav, Eli Ilan 1928-1982, Retrospective, Herzliya, Israel, Herzliya Museum of Contemporary Art, 1992.
- Kohansky, Mendel, Sculptures of Eli Ilan, London, Jacques O'Hana Gallery, 1974.
- Renee Darom Galerie D'art, Eli Ilan Sculpture, Tel Aviv, Renee Darom Galerie D'art, 1974
