= Ya'acov Dorchin =

Israeli artist

- יעקב דורצ'ין
- Born: 12 March 1946 (age 80); Haifa, Mandatory Palestine
- Occupations: Sculptor; Painter
- Known for: Iron sculptures
- Awards: EMET Prize (2004); Israel Prize (2011)

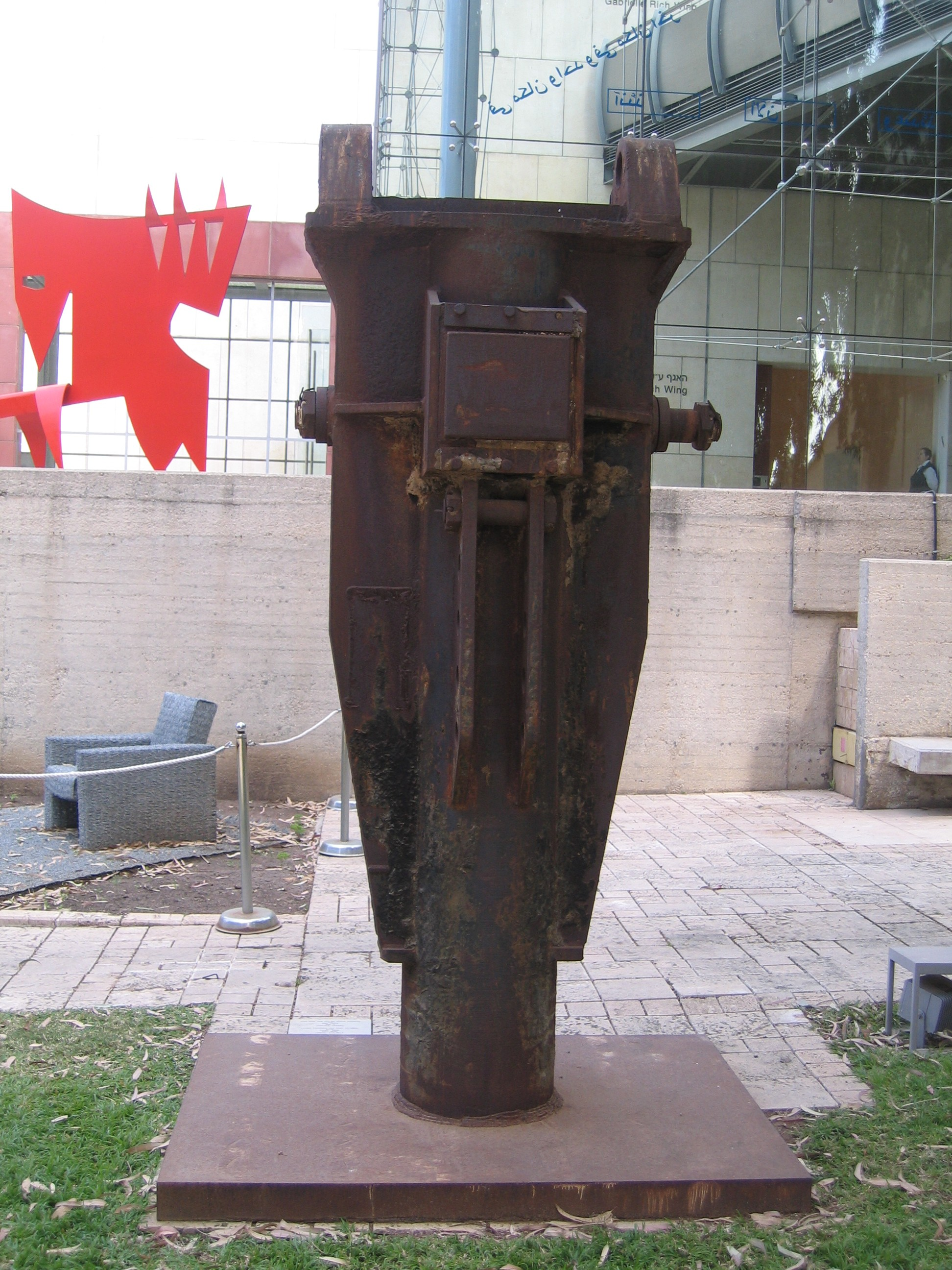
Angel, sculpture by Ya'acov Dorchin, 1993, Tel Aviv Museum of Art, Tel Aviv, Israel

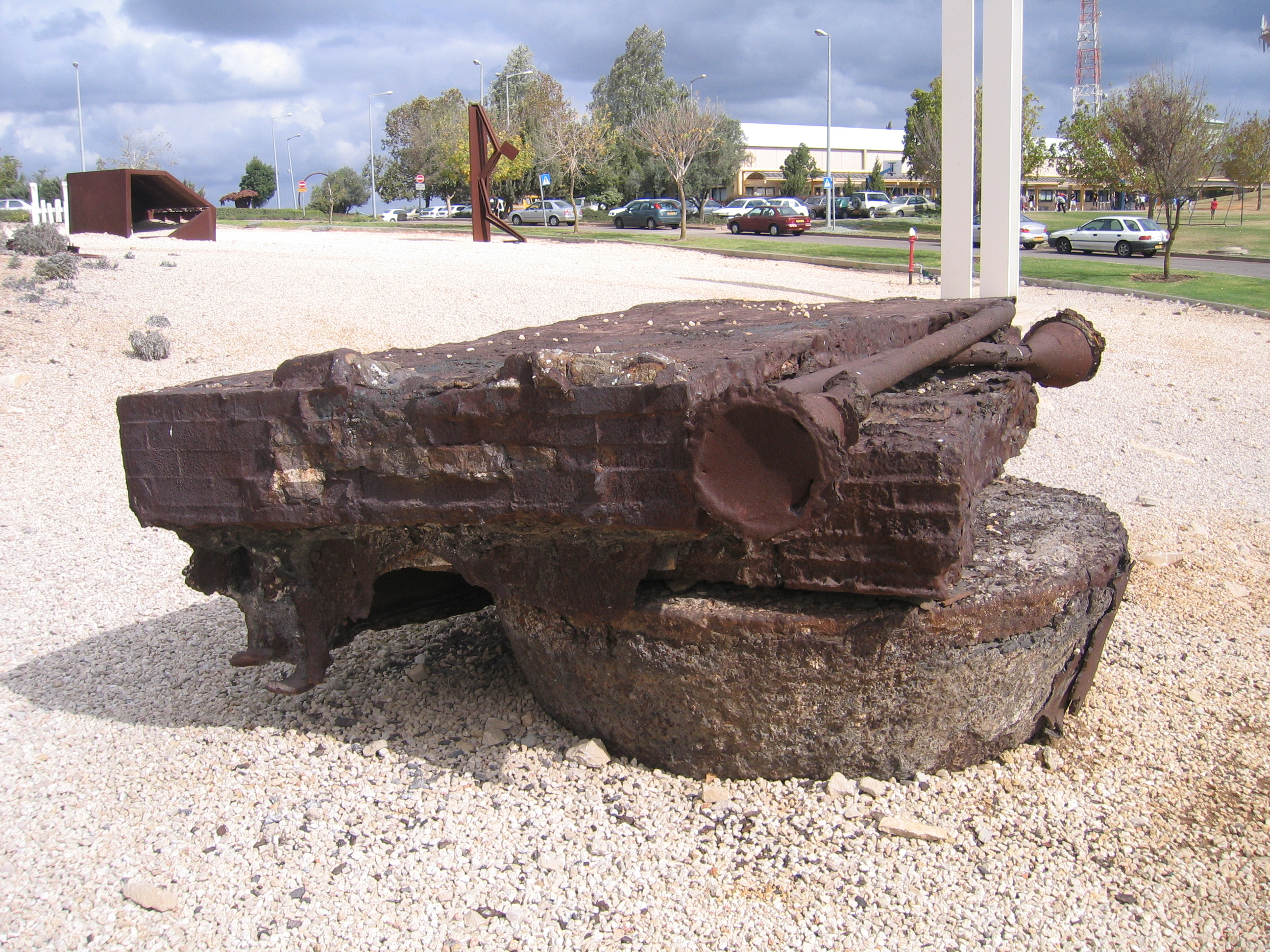
Tuba Merum, sculpture by Ya'acov Dorchin, 1994, Tefen Sculpture Garden, Galilee

Ya'acov Dorchin (Hebrew: יעקב דורצ'ין; born 12 March 1946), also known as Yaacov Dorchin, is an Israeli sculptor and painter.

== Biography ==
Dorchin was born in Haifa in Mandate Palestine in 1946. In 1967, he moved to Kibbutz Kfar HaHoresh.

In the 1980s, Dorchin began creating iron sculptures. He has lectured at the University of Haifa since 1991 and served as the head of the university's Art Department from 1997 to 2001.

As of 2020, Dorchin is the artistic director of the Basis art school, a position he took in 2015.

In 1990, Dorchin exhibited at the Israeli Pavilion in Venice Biennale.

== Awards ==
- In 2004, Dorchin was awarded the EMET Prize, for the arts.
- In 2011, he was awarded the Israel Prize, for the visual arts.

== Bibliography ==
- Tel Aviv Museum of Art, Yaacov Dorchin, Tel Aviv, Tel Aviv Museum of Art, 1995.

== See also ==
- List of Israel Prize recipients
