= Harry Levine =

Harry Levine (August 1, 1895 – May 1, 1977) was the Massachusetts President and Chairman of the Board of the U.S. Plastic and Chemical Company. He made major, multifaceted contributions to the creation and development of the State of Israel, related primarily to the facilitation of the construction and import of Uzi submachine guns into then British-Mandated Palestine. He played a central role in the founding of the Weizmann Institute of Science; he provided initiatives for the practical application of science research there, and was a pioneer of a science-based industrial complex in Rehovot, adjacent to the Weizmann Institute, which was the first of its kind in Israel.

A man of great reserve throughout his career, Levine disclaimed public acclaim for his contributions and avoided public disclosure of them during his lifetime.

== Personal life ==
Harry Levine was born on August 1, 1895, in New York City to Samuel and Sarah Levine. He was educated in the public schools of New York and at the College of the City of New York. He married his first wife, Hannah, in 1919; she died in 1941. He had three children with Hannah: Irwin (killed in World War II), Morton and Barbara, and had six grandchildren. He married his second wife, Leona, in 1942.

Levine served in the U.S. Navy during World War I, working on a minelayer ship in the North Sea.

Levine was elected President of New England Plastics and Commonwealth Plastic in 1946, as well as President and Chairman of the Board of the U.S. Plastic and Chemical Company in 1952. In 1949, he founded the Serafon Plastics Company in Rehovot, Israel.

He died on May 1, 1977, at age 82.

== Zionism ==
Levine was introduced to Zionism in 1935 by Elihu D. Stone of Boston. Once pledged, Levine felt it was his responsibility to act on the tenets of Zionism, no matter what the sacrifice. This concept of duty expressed itself in a singular and dramatic role; providing the means for self-defense through underground networks for both Palestine, prior to statehood, and Israel, following statehood.

Levine was a member of the original group of thirteen who, years before Jewish statehood, grasped Dr. Chaim Weizmann’s vision of the potential for science to grow the resources of Palestine. They gave to science research pioneering support and formed the American Committee for the Weizmann Institute of Science. The Weizmann Institute of Science emerged to take its place as a principal instrument for the advancement of human progress, and as a cornerstone of Israel’s survival and development. Harry and his wife Leona donated the Institute of Applied Science as a feature of the Weizmann Institute to be a platform for scientists to develop their results of fundamental research in different branches of science. As early as 1945, Levine financed research at Harvard University on the purification of brackish water in the Negev, a desert in Southern Israel.

His gifts to the Weizmann Institute include, in addition, a $1 million pledge to expand the Harry and Leona Levine Institute of Applied Science, to make possible mission oriented research; endowment of the Abba Eban Professorial Chair in international relations in 1966, and two mathematics prizes in 1970, each at $1,000, to encourage studies in the field.

Levine felt that the Weizmann Institute could be a showcase for the world to see what dedicated scientists are capable of, not just for Israel, but for all of humanity. He stated that "because Israel has limited natural resources, it must depend on brain power, and brain power reflected in science research and applied sciences will go a long way in developing the economy of the country. The know-how of the Weizmann Institute could be applied with equal effectiveness to the Mideast region, once there is peace with Israel's Arab neighbors."

== Camp Young Judaea ==
Levine was introduced to Justice Louis D. Brandeis by Dr. Shlomo Berdin. Brandeis commissioned Levine to organize youth activities throughout the New England area, and to start a summer camp with the program, directed by the national headquarters of the Zionist Organization of America. The then-called Zionist Youth Camp began on 165 acres at Mont Vernon, New Hampshire, in 1939. Starting with 50 children, from ages 8 to 15, the camp now runs programs for Jewish youth in grade 2-12. It is the oldest Zionist youth camp in the United States.

== Contribution to Armaments Factory ==
In 1942, Jewish leadership had determined to seek Jewish Statehood in Palestine at the end of the war. That resolve was fortified by the full disclosure of the decimation of European Jewry by Adolf Hitler, and by the refusal of the British to permit the survivors to enter Palestine. Levine's specific task was to secure the design of a powerful, versatile automatic weapon; the assembly of the machinery for making it; and the smuggling of this machinery into Palestine. Later, the task also included plans for making ammunition for the gun and the acquisition of war surplus materials.

Levine was, presumably, selected for the task because of his industrial knowledge and connections, as someone who had been in the Navy and worked in the plastics and chemical industry for most of his adult life. Levine bought the York Lock & Key Company in 1942 or 1943 and sold the interest after World War II. During the war, York Lock & Key manufactured weapons; much of the whole plant was turned over for the war effort. In 1945, Chaim Slavin visited the United States and arranged a visit to Levine's office. Slavin was an engineer from Russia who worked with Pinhas Rutenberg on building a power station at Naharayim, and managed the clandestine arms industry Ta'as in Mandatory Palestine from 1937 to 1952.

Slavin was sent to meet with Levine as a representative of a group of Zionists working to establish Israel as a state, and as a collective they decided that Jews in Palestine should set up their own plant for producing guns and ammunition, including the Thompson machine gun. Levine and Slavin met in Levine's plastics factory where Slavin proposed this important project and requested Levine's involvement. At that point, all weaponry was purchased in Europe for three or four times the price than the actual value. Slavin needed blueprints for the machine gun and requested Levine's aid in acquiring them as soon as possible. It was a dangerous endeavor as they couldn't get the blueprint without explaining why they needed it, thus revealing the plan to arm Jews in Palestine.

Slavin and Levine had trouble finding a location in the United States where they could develop a plant to make weapons and acquiring the necessary tools, jigs and fixtures. Levine and Slavin eventually found a cooperating factory and rented space; they did not inform the property owner of details, they only said they were using the space to do research in connection with the Weizmann Institute. Slavin, Levine and their team set up an engineering department, made individual blueprints of component pieces of the weapon, and distributed those to approximately 20 machine shops in Toronto to ensure that the project remained a secret.

In 1947, the FBI became interested in the operation and the Royal Canadians filed to extradite Levine, as the plant in Canada was under his name. As a result, Levine was persona non grata in Canada and wasn't permitted to enter Canada for at least 10 years. At that point, some of the machine components had been sent to Levine's plastics warehouse in the Bronx. From there, Slavin and Levine bought boilers, took the tubes out and filled them with all of the tools, jigs and fixtures so that it appeared that they were shipping over boilers. They had a proper export license and were connected to a factory in Palestine that had the import license, and they clandestinely shipped the boilers. The boilers got through to Palestine and were placed in underground plants. Workers in the machine shops began working on the tools, jigs and fixtures and then began to buy machinery and producing weapons.

Leonard Slater, the man who conducted an interview with Levine regarding his role in the American underground movement that helped arm the unborn state of Israel for its war of independence, used the interview in his book The Pledge in 1971. The Pledge, made up of first-hand correspondence and interviews, is a narrative of a little-known subplot to the story of the state of Israel's birth.

== Legacy ==
Harry Levine understood early on that a primary prerequisite of modern and viable statehood is basic and all-encompassing applied scientific research, which allows a society to be able to anticipate and serve the country's economic and industrial needs at all times and on many levels. The achievements of the Weizmann Institute are world-renowned. As of 2016, there are 238 research groups, 172 staff scientists, 700 PhD students, 300 MS students, 380 postdoctoral fellows, $100M in research grants for scientific investigations, and 1,000 active grants.

Further, Levine's role in the development of armaments factories in Israel prior to established statehood quietly contributed to a well-established paramilitary organization known as the Haganah, which became the core of the Israel Defense Forces. Haganah was initially a clandestine paramilitary organization; after 'having gotten the Jews of Palestine and of elsewhere to do everything that they could, personally and financially, to help Yishuv,' Ben-Gurion successfully transformed the Haganah into a true army. The IDF uses weapons manufactured by Israel Military Industries (IMI), previously referred to as Ta'as before statehood; their small arms are some of the most popular in the world. The Uzi submachine gun is one of the most popular machine guns in the world. The reliance on locally manufactured military equipment has also greatly increased. Today, the overwhelming majority of Israel's military equipment is either manufactured in the United States (and often modified in Israeli workshops), or is developed and manufactured locally, with an increasing emphasis on advanced technology, including aerospace and electronics.

Ultimately, Levine ran a risk by participating in the development of armaments factories in Palestine as a highly respected business man. He felt it was his duty, regardless of the outcome, to help protect the small number of Jews in Palestine prior to statehood in the name of Zionism: moving to build a safe, national home, and protecting it.
