= Ze'ev Herring =

Israeli politician (1910–1988)

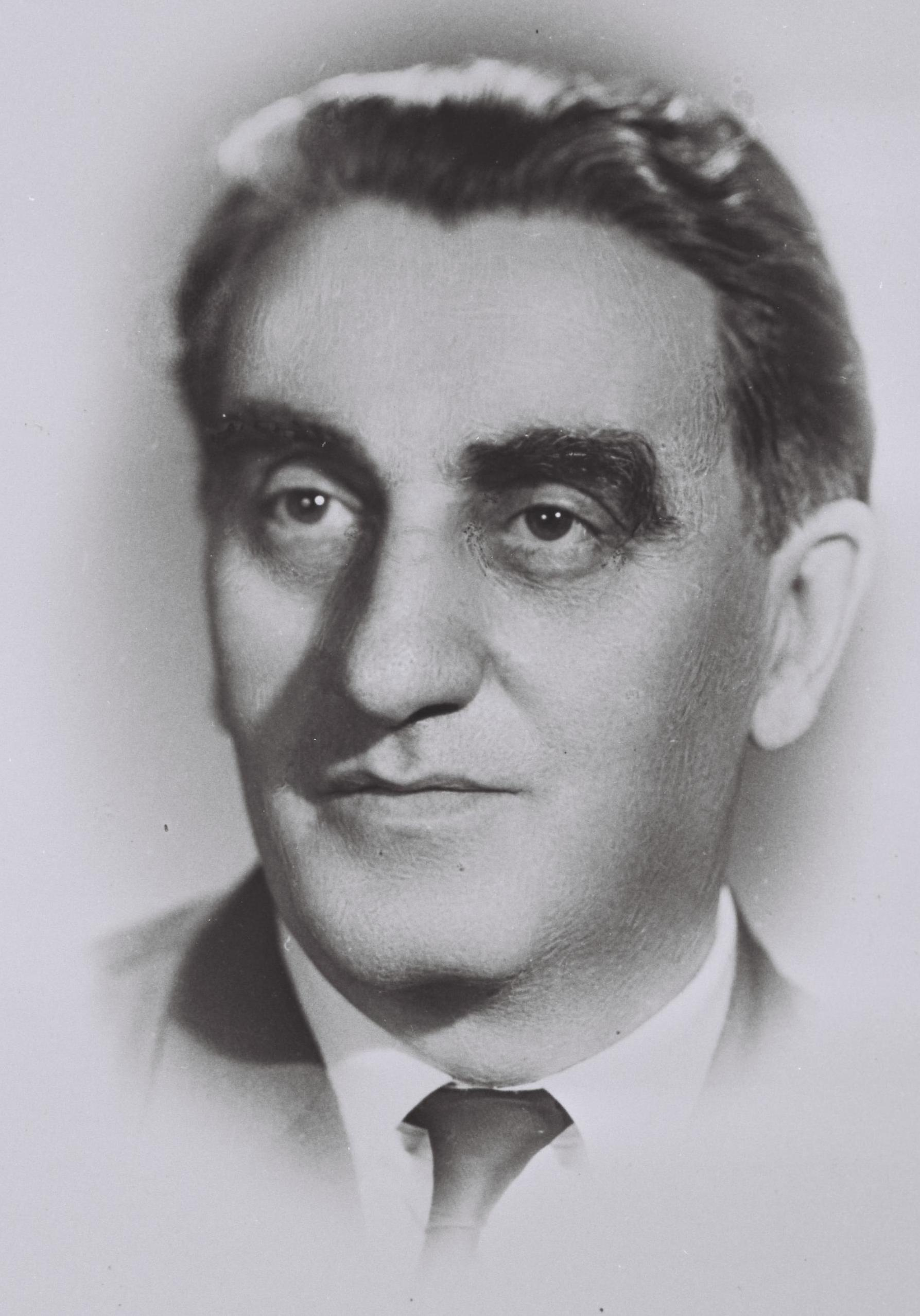
- Herring in 1969

Faction represented in the Knesset
- 1969–1974: Alignment

Personal details
- Born: 1910 Przemyśl, Austria-Hungary
- Died: 26 February 1988 (aged 77–78)

Ze'ev Herring (Hebrew: זאב הרינג; 1910 – 26 February 1988) was an Israeli politician who served as a member of the Knesset for the Alignment between 1969 and 1974.

== Biography ==
Born in Przemyśl in Austria-Hungary (today in Poland), Herring studied law at the University of Warsaw, and later at the London School of Economics. He became active in Jewish student organisations, and joined the Zionist Socialist Workers Party. In 1935 he became secretary general of the party in eastern Galicia, and edited its Yiddish language weekly newspaper.

In 1940 he emigrated to Mandatory Palestine, where he settled in kibbutz Ramat David. In the same year volunteered for the British Army. He served in the Jewish Brigade, and following the end of the war, helped Holocaust survivors make aliyah to Palestine, serving as secretary of the Jewish Brigade's diaspora centre between 1946 and 1947.

In 1954, he became a member of the Histadrut's executive committee and was a member of its planning committee between 1954 and 1969. He also later chaired its department for external relations. In 1956, he started lecturing in the political science department at Tel Aviv University, where he worked until 1960.

In 1969 he was elected to the Knesset on the Alignment list but lost his seat in the 1973 elections.

He died in 1988.
