= Shabtai Teveth =

Israeli historian (1925–2014)

- שבתאי טבת
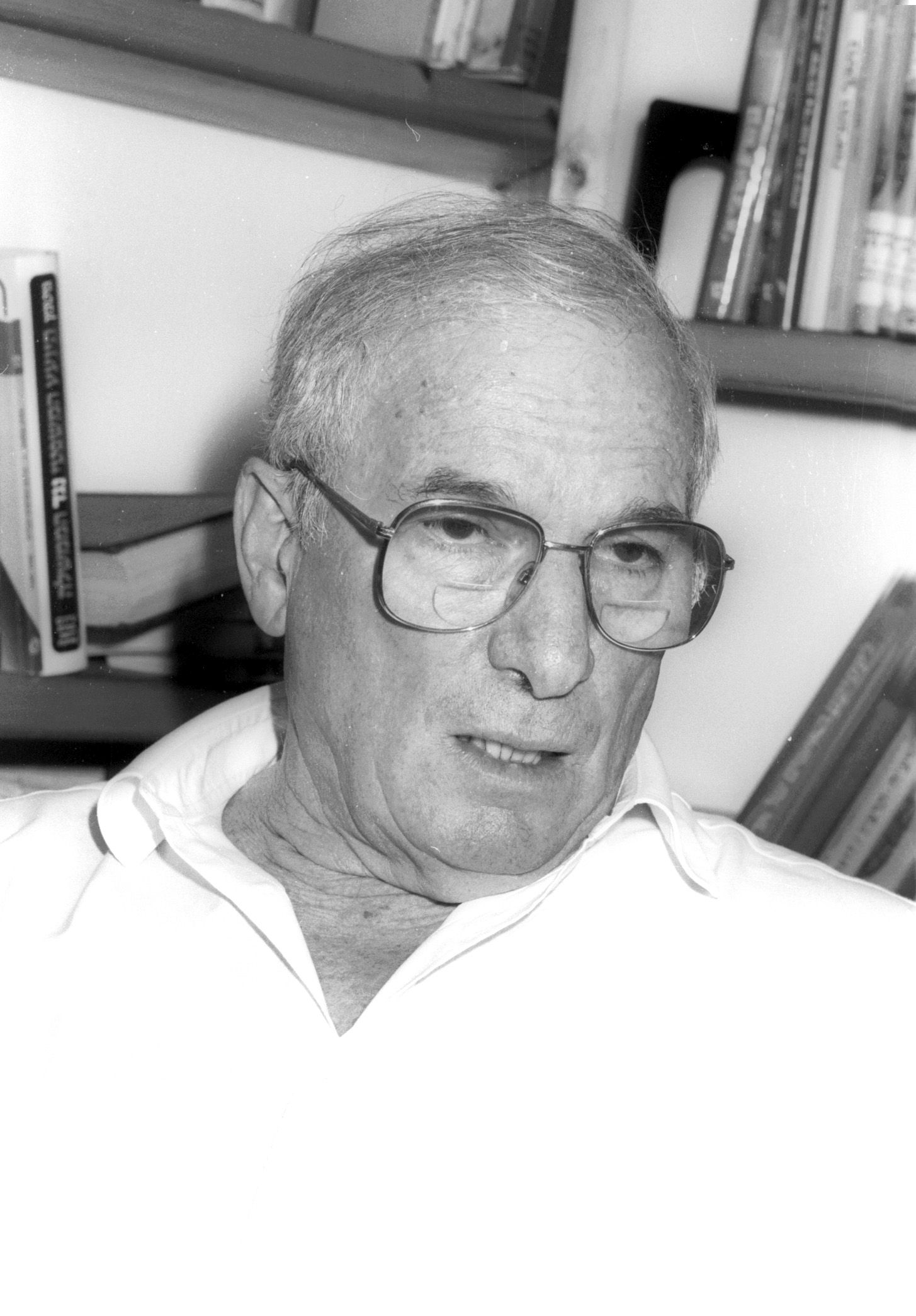
- Shabtai Teveth in 1988
- Born: 1925; Petah Tikva, Mandatory Palestine
- Died: 1 November 2014 (aged 88–89), Israel
- Occupations: Historian, Author
- Known for: Biography of David Ben-Gurion
- Awards: Israel Prize (2005)

Shabtai Teveth (Hebrew: שבתאי טבת; 1925 – 1 November 2014) was an Israeli historian and author.

Teveth was born in 1925 and grew up in the worker' quarters at the Migdal Tzedek quarry, where his father worked, near Petah Tikva. He began working as a journalist for the newspaper Haaretz in 1950, eventually becoming its political correspondent. In 1981, he was appointed senior research fellow at the Moshe Dayan Center for Middle Eastern and African Studies at Tel Aviv University.

Following the publication of his research into the murder of Haim Arlosoroff, 1982, Menachim Begin - first Israeli Prime Minister elected from the Revisionist movement - ordered a Judicial Commission of Enquiry which concluded that Teveth was wrong to suggest the murder might have been carried out by two Revisionists.

In his biography of David Ben-Gurion, Teveth argues that Ben-Gurion did not instigate a policy of population transfer.

In 2005, Teveth was awarded the Israel Prize for "lifetime achievement and special contribution to society and the State."

== Published works ==
- The tanks of Tammuz. Tel Aviv: Schocken. 1968. (English: The tanks of Tammuz. Viking Press. 1969.) An account of Israel's Armoured Corps during the 1967 war.
- The cursed blessing: the story of Israel's occupation of the West Bank. Weidenfeld & Nicolson. 1969. ISBN 0-297-00150-7. - Translated from Hebrew to English by Myra Bank (1970).
- Moshe Dayan: the soldier, the man, the legend. Schocken. 1971. (English: Moshe Dayan: the soldier, the man, the legend. Houghton Mifflin. 1973. ISBN 0-7043-1080-5.)
- Kin'at David (David's Jealousy). Schocken. 1980. Two volumes.
- רצח ארלוזורוב [The Arlosoroff Murder] (in Hebrew). Schocken. 1982. ISBN 9789651900815.
- Ben-Gurion and the Palestinian Arabs: from peace to war. Oxford University Press. 1985. ISBN 978-0-19-503562-9.
- The Incarnations of Transfer in Zionist Thinking 1988. (Hebrew), Ha'aretz.
- Charging Israel With Original Sin (www.commentarymagazine.com/articles/shabtai-teveth/charging-israel-with-original-sin/)
- The evolution of "transfer" in Zionist thinking. Moshe Dayan Center for Middle Eastern and African Studies, Shiloah Institute, Tel Aviv University. 1989.
- Ben-Gurion and the Holocaust. Harcourt Brace & Co. 1996.
- The Burning Ground. Tel Aviv: Schocken. 1997. Two Volumes. Biography of David Ben-Gurion.
- Ben-Gurion's spy: the story of the political scandal that shaped modern Israel. Columbia University Press. 1996. ISBN 978-0-231-10464-7.

== Awards ==
- 1988: National Jewish Book Award in the Israel category for Ben Gurion: The Burning Ground
