= Migdal Afek =

Israeli national park to the southeast of Rosh HaAyin

Coordinates: 32°4′51″N 34°57′25″E

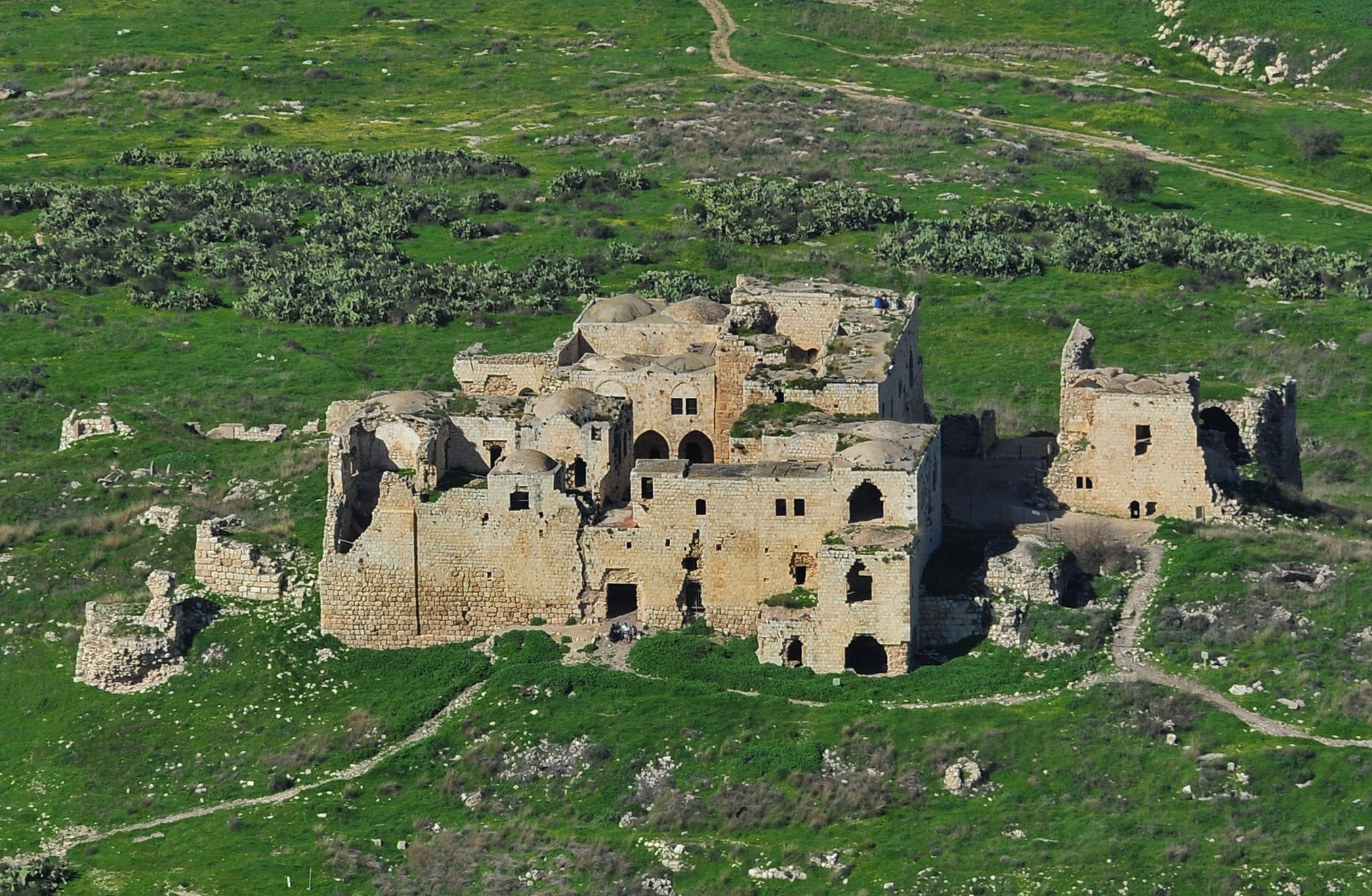
The remains of the crusader castle of Mirabel and the Rayyan family manor built atop the castle, 2011

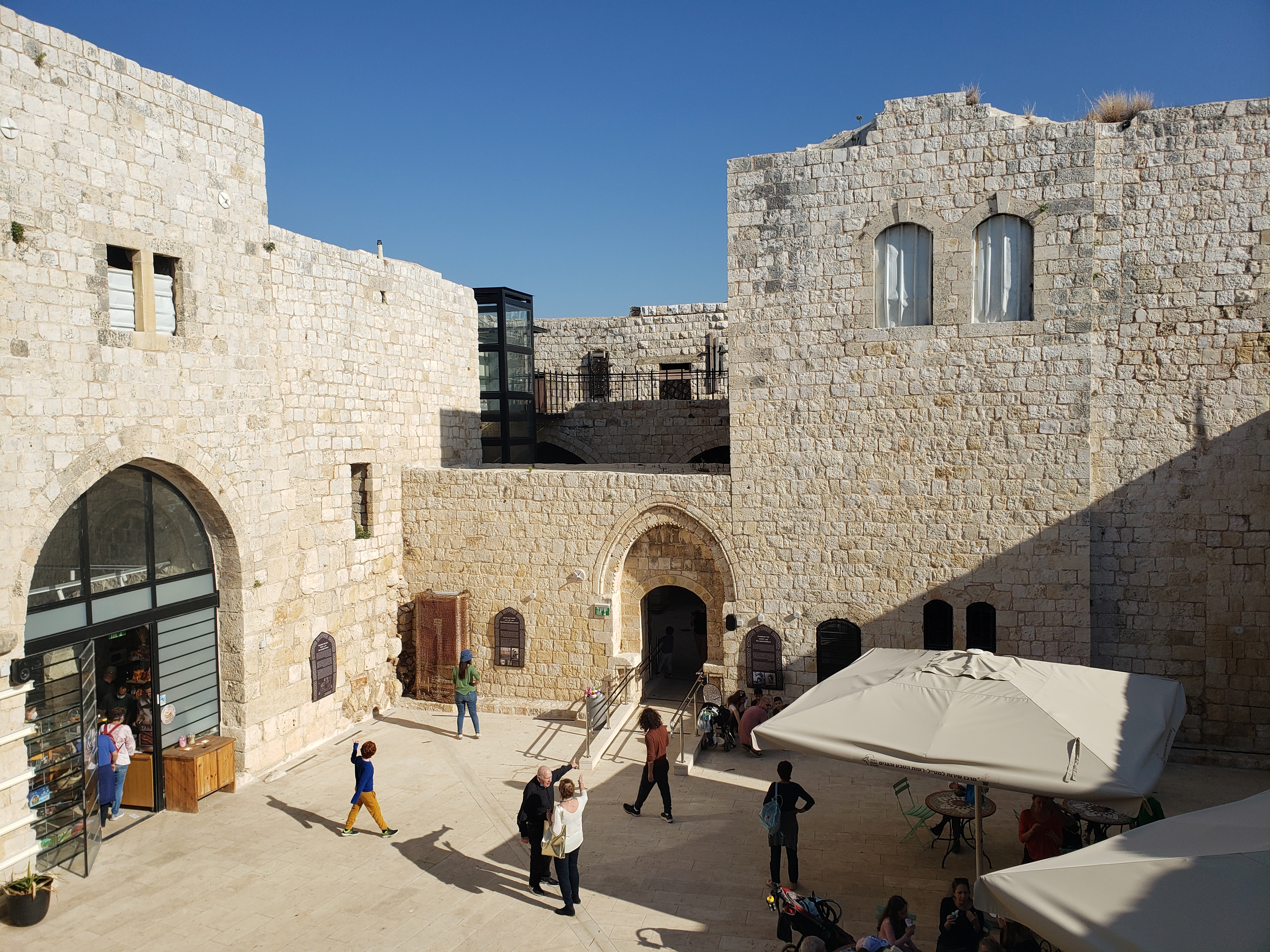
The courtyard after the restoration

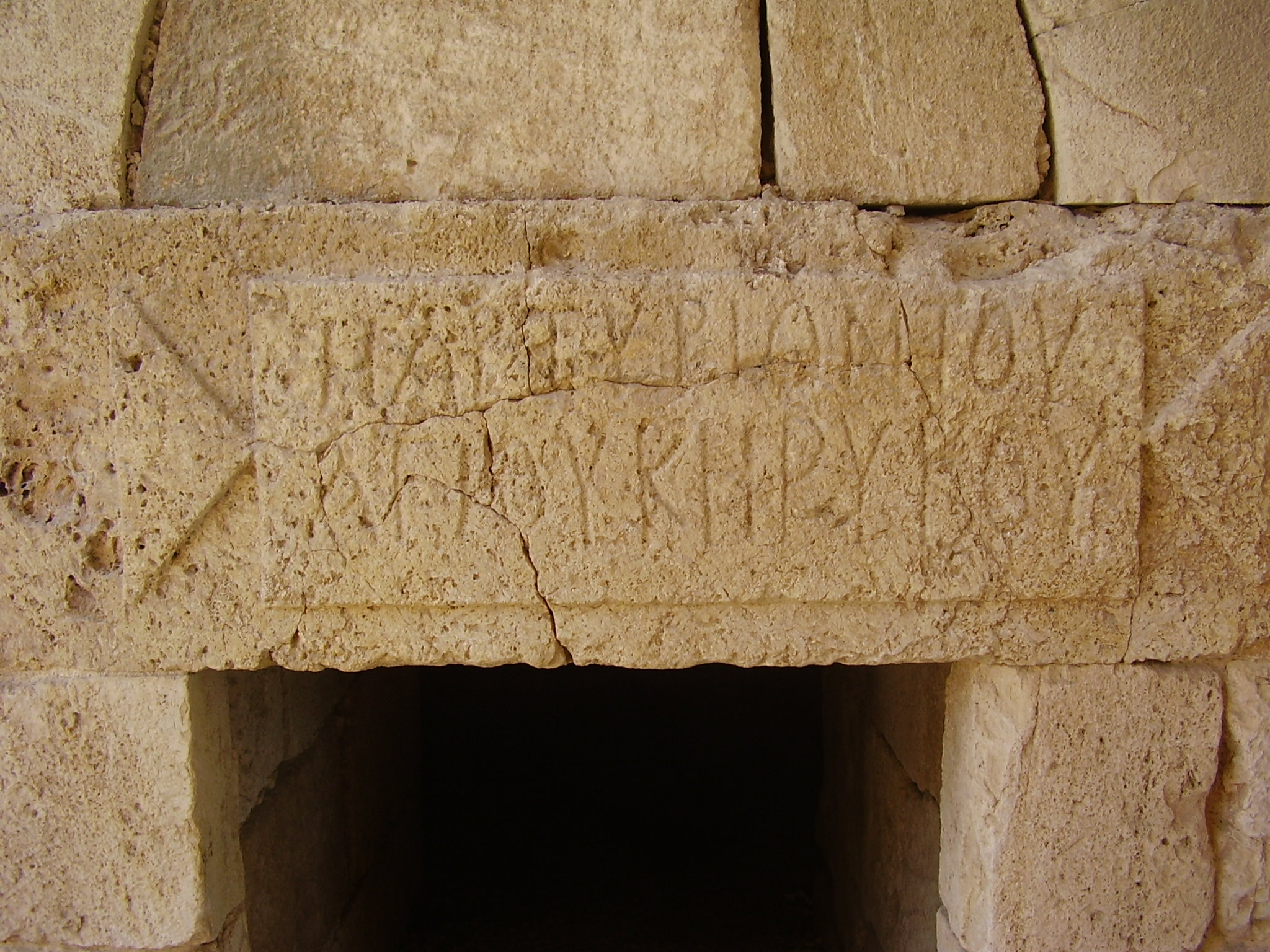
Greek inscription over doorway

Migdal Afek (Hebrew: מגדל אפק), also Migdal Tsedek (Tzedek, Zedek; Hebrew: מגדל צדק), is a national park on the southeastern edge of Rosh HaAyin, Israel. The ruins of a fortified manor house built by a sheikh during the 19th century, among which remains of the Crusader castle of Mirabel can be seen, are today known in Hebrew as Migdal Afek or Migdal Tsedek. It is the site of the ethnically cleansed Palestinian village of Majdal Yaba.

== Etymology ==
Migdal Aphek (Hebrew: מגדל אפק; Ancient Greek: Αφεχού πύργος, 'Aphek Pyrgos') means 'Tower of Aphek' in both those languages.

Migdal Tsedek means "Tower of Sadek" in Hebrew, referring to the name of Sheikh Sadek al-Rayyan.

== History ==
The walled Jewish settlement of Migdal Aphek or Afek stood at the site as early as the second century BCE, and was destroyed by the Romans during the First Jewish–Roman War in 67 CE.

From a Byzantine-period church, a lintel set over a stone-built doorway survives, bearing the Greek inscription "ΜΑΡΤΥΡΙΟΝ ΤΟΥ ΑΓΙΟΥ ΚΗΡΥΚΟΥ", Martyr shrine (martyrion) of Saint Kyriko. The room behind it was used by the al-Rayyan sheikh as a stable and for fodder storage.

In the Crusader period, a castle named Mirabel was built at the site of ancient Migdal Afek. It was described in Muslim sources in 1225 as a village with a fortress called Majdal Yaba.

For a short time under Ottoman rule, its name was changed from that to Majdal Sadiq and then back again.

In the 17th century, the village was taken over by the Rayyān family, who arrived from Transjordan and built a two-story manor house.

During World War I, Migdal Afek was the site of battles between the Central Powers (forces of the Ottoman, German, and Austro-Hungarian empires) and the British imperial Egyptian Expeditionary Force.

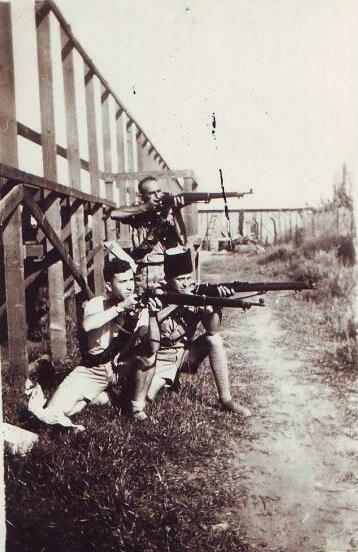
Haganah fighters guarding a position near Migdal Tzedek during the Arab revolt, 1936

In the 1940s, the Solel Boneh quarry at Migdal Tzedek was used by Ta'as, the underground Jewish arms industry, for testing the first weapons it produced.

The Arab village was depopulated by the IDF in July 1948, during the Nakba.

== See also ==
- National parks of Israel
- David Polus (1893–1975), sculptor who worked in the Labor Battalion at the quarry
- Solel Boneh, Jewish construction company that ran a Mandate-period quarry at Migdal Tzedek
- Ta'as, clandestine Mandate-period Jewish arms industry; used Migdal Tzedek quarry as testing range
- Eliyahu Tamler, Irgun commander who captured a lorry carrying explosives to Migdal Tzedek quarry
- Shabtai Teveth (1925–2014) Israeli historian who grew up in the workers' quarters at the quarry
- Vassals of the Kingdom of Jerusalem
