= Zvi Yanai =

Israeli civil servant and author

Zvi Yanai (Hebrew: צבי ינאי; June 9, 1935 – December 16, 2013) was an Israeli civil servant and author.

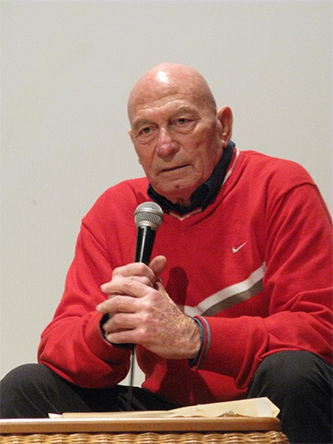
Zvi Yanai

== Biography ==
Sandro Toth (later Zvi Yanai) was born in Pescara, Italy. His father was a baritone singer from Budapest, and his mother was a prima ballerina from Graz, Austria. They were not married. His father was Christian and his mother was Jewish. He was raised as a Protestant but converted to Catholicism in 1942 and studied for the priesthood.

He immigrated to Mandatory Palestine at the age of 10 and was sent to Kibbutz Ramat David. He later served in the Israel Defense Forces and worked at IBM-Israel for many years. Yanai became a self-described atheist, but felt a strong connection to Jewish history and thought.

Yanai was head of Israel's Ministry of Science in 1993–1997, and editor of the periodical Mahshavot (Thoughts). Some of the ministry's programs continue to function due to his initiatives. His then-innovative ideas to bring the general public closer to science will continue to be the basis for many of our activities in the future,” Peri said. Yanai was a “pioneer who opened up the world of science to the layman. His work can still be identified in popular culture today,” he concluded.
