= David Polus =

Israeli sculptor (1893–1975)

David Polus דוד פולוס
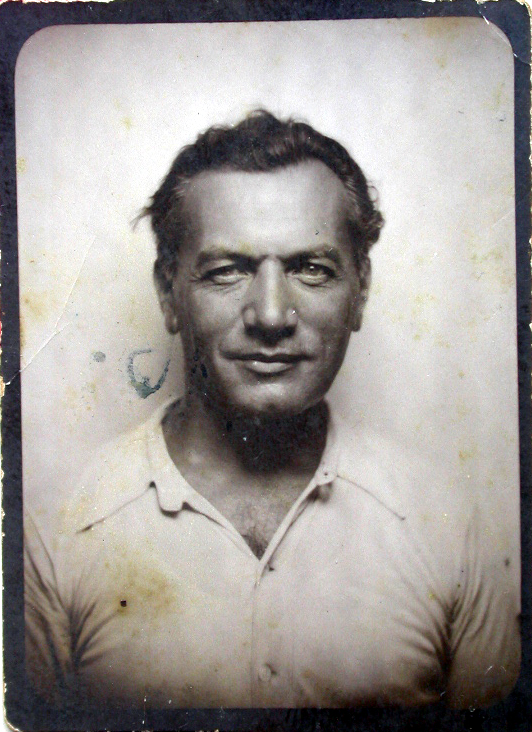
- Born: 1893
- Died: January 5, 1975 (aged 81–82)
- Known for: Sculpture
- Notable work: Alexander Zaid, Israel Saba

David ben Yisrael Moshe Polus (Hebrew: דוד בן ישראל משה פולוס; 1893 – January 5, 1975) was an Israeli sculptor who wandered from town to town in the land of Israel, and resided wherever he sculpted.

== Biography ==
=== Early life ===
Polus grew up in Warsaw, the capital of Poland. According to Alkhani and Friedlander, in his youth in Warsaw, he was a diligent yeshiva student, deeply engaged in studying Talmudic pages. In the yeshiva, he used to decorate the hall in honor of completing a tractate of the Talmud, and from there, his inclination for sculpture emerged. He immigrated to the Land of Israel during the Fourth Aliya on the ship "Romania" as a pioneer in August 1924. In a poem he wrote in Yiddish in the 1920s, he stated, among other things: "A pioneer arose and ascended... Talent is your property."

=== In Eretz Israel ===
Polus was a member of the Labor Battalion and the excavation group of Yitzhak Sadeh. His first sculpture in the Land of Israel was unveiled while he was in the Labor Battalion in Migdal Tzedek: a bust of Aharon David Gordon. In February 1932, Paulus sent a proposal, published in the newspaper "Davar," to the management of the "Levant Fair" (Yerid Hamizrach) exhibition. According to the proposal, a sculpture competition would be announced, and the best works would be displayed in the exhibition, providing an incentive for artistic creation.

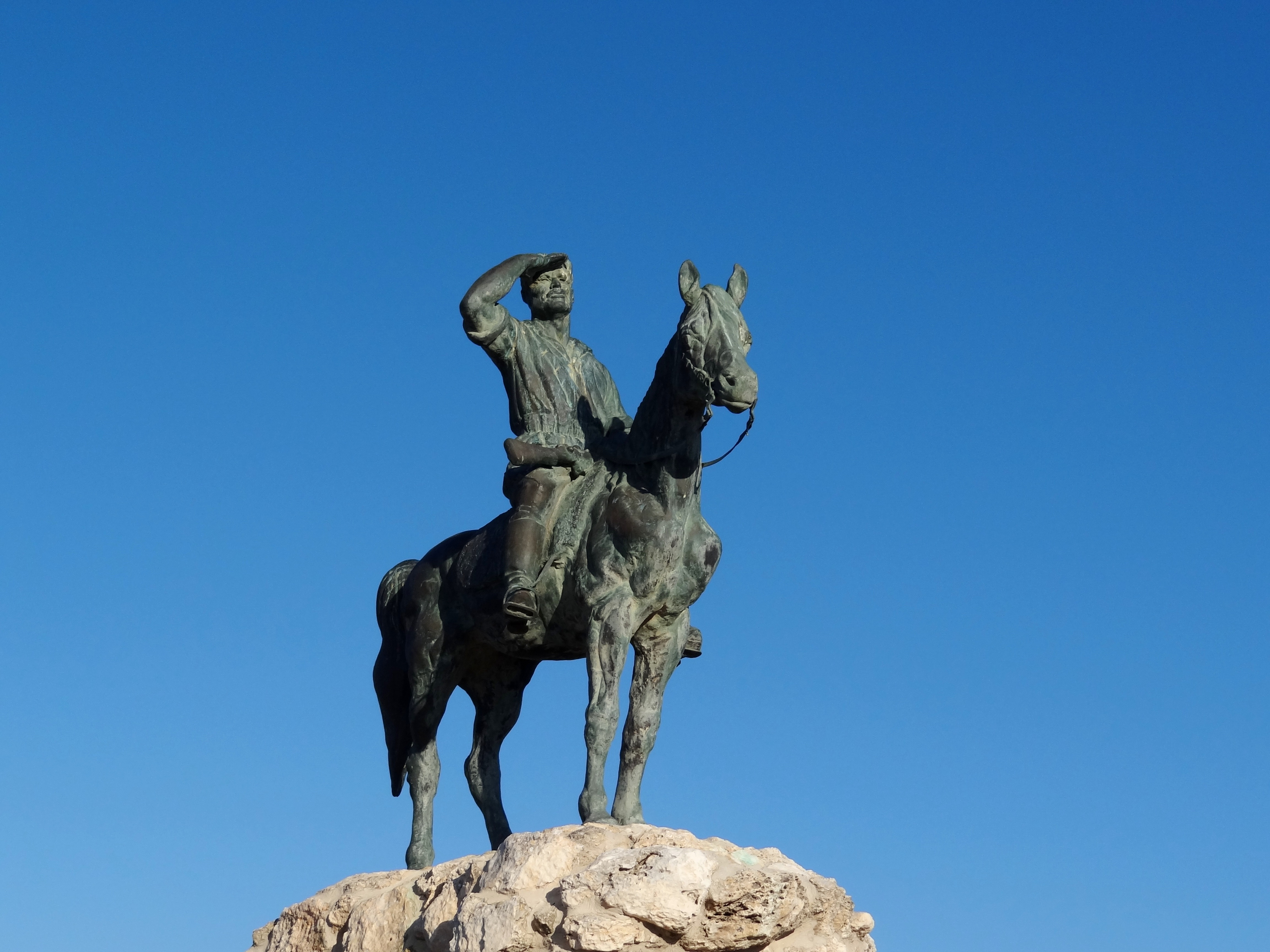
Alexander Zaid monument, Beit Shearim

Polus used to wander throughout the country. He lived in various kibbutzim and sculpted in them in exchange for a livelihood only, without additional pay. This was the case in Ramat David, Tel Yosef, Beit Oren, and Ramat Rachel. According to a document in the state archives dated September 22, 1936, Polus, registered as a teacher, resided on Herzl Street in Tel Aviv (then the Mahlul neighborhood), near the Delphinar-Yochananoff Silk Weaving and Dyeing Factory. He had a shack where he used to isolate himself and plan new works. Later on, he moved to Jerusalem and lived in the last twenty years of his life in another shack, in the heart of the Jerusalem Forest near the Ein Kerem neighborhood. In 1940 he sculpted the Alexander Zaid memorial near Beit Shearim.

Polus died, unmarried and childless in Jerusalem in 1975.

== Artistic style ==
Several of his works were of the realist style. Among these there are visual motifs depicting the rise of the Jewish people in their land. Polus used locally available, relatively simple and inexpensive materials such as concrete, plaster on lattice, and iron rods. This led to increased decay in his sculptures, requiring constant maintenance. During his time, Polus reinforced them himself. Over the years, some have been renovated, while others have withstood the test of time.

== Selected works ==
- "David the Shepherd" (1935–1936, installed in 1938) is a sculpture located in Kibbutz Einat (Ramat David), depicting King David as a shepherd with a lamb by his side, and he is portrayed playing a musical instrument. For two years of his work, the sculptor lived in a hut in exchange for his work. He asked the kibbutz for the most handsome member to serve as a model, and Aaron Shitil, a kibbutz sandal maker, was chosen for the role. The sculpture was renovated in 2006 in honor of Kibbutz Ramat David's eightieth anniversary. In 2021, after the sculpture weathered again, the longtime residents of the kibbutz mobilized to renovate it once more.
- "Alexander Zaid Memorial" (1938–1941) is located on the hills of Sheikh Abreik, near Beit She'arim. The sculpture depicts the figure of Zaid riding on his horse. It is placed on a platform made of local stones, and beside it are two bronze plaques on which David Remez's proposal is inscribed: "Alexander Zaid guards in Israel." The original sculpture was constructed from cast concrete on iron mesh. The sculpture, erected with the participation of the Workers' Federation of the General Federation of Labor in Eretz Israel, was dedicated on July 6, 1941. The unveiling ceremony took place in the presence of many youth and students from the Beit Hesder School, guided by their teachers. Speeches were delivered by Shlomo Kaplansky, Zalman Shazar, and others. At the end of the event, participants visited Zaid's room and saw another sculpture made by Batya Lishansky. The memorial, located in the national park of Beit She'arim, serves as a site for visitors to this day. In the early 1960s, the involvement of Zipporah Zaid, Alexander's wife, saved the sculpture from deterioration. Her efforts, along with the support of the family and especially the assistance of her niece, ultimately led to its restoration. In the 1970s, it was refurbished and recast in bronze after prolonged weathering.
- "Al Menuchot Yenahaleni" (1941) is a sculpture located in Kibbutz Tel Yosef. The sculpture consists of two sculptural groups: one depicting several young children, and the other portraying a couple in swimwear. Asaf Shimchoni's wife served as the model for the young woman. The sculpture was placed in the leisure pool of the kibbutz. Today, the sculpture is situated on the lawn in the kibbutz and suffers from the effects of time and the environment.
- "Nahum Sirkis" (1944) - A sculpture of Nahum Sirkis in the Workers' Museum.
- "Generations Integration" or "Israel Saba" (1945) - A sculpture in Beit Oren, depicting the old generation represented by an elderly man wearing a prayer shawl, embracing the young generation represented by a Hebrew worker-fighter holding a rifle and a tool. The sculpture appeared on the front page of "Davar Hashavua" on June 28, 1946. It was later severely damaged by adverse weather conditions. Some claim that Yiftah Zaid, the son of Alexander Zaid, was the model for this sculpture."
- Monument in Memory of the Fallen Soldiers of Kiryat Tivon in the War of Independence (1952) - A monument with two concrete plaques crafted by the hand of Paulus, dedicated to the memory of the fallen soldiers of Kiryat Tivon in the War of Independence.
- Eliezer Steinman 1963, a sculpture of Eliezer Steinmen

=== Busts by Polus ===
- A.D Gordon
- Yosef Spriznak
- David Ben Gurion
- Moshe Sharet
- Budha

Between 1967 and 1971, Polus corresponded extensively with the office of the then-President Zalman Shazar, hoping that it would assist him in his future artistic endeavors.

== Gallery ==
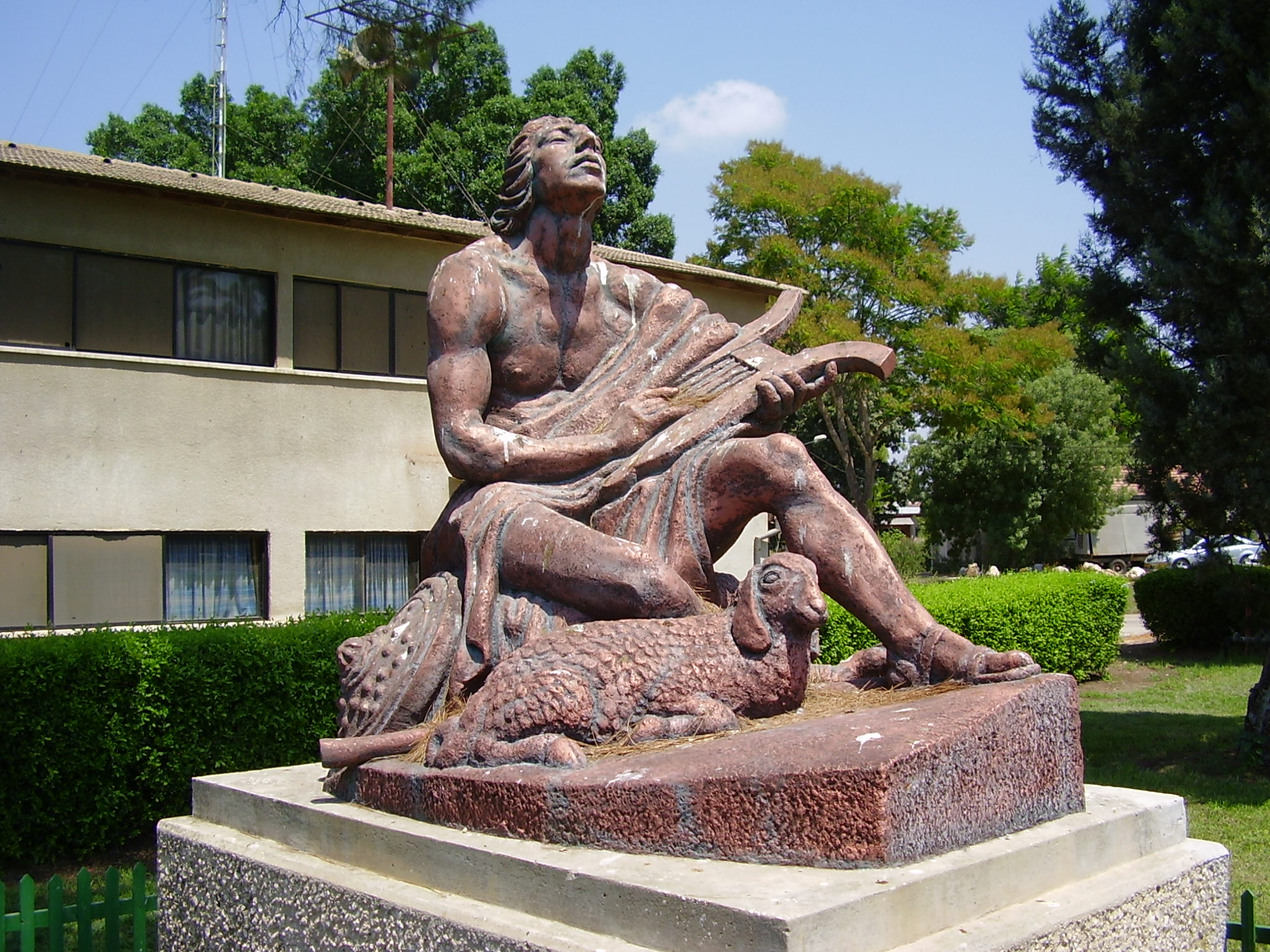
Shepard David playing the harp, in kibbutz Ramat David

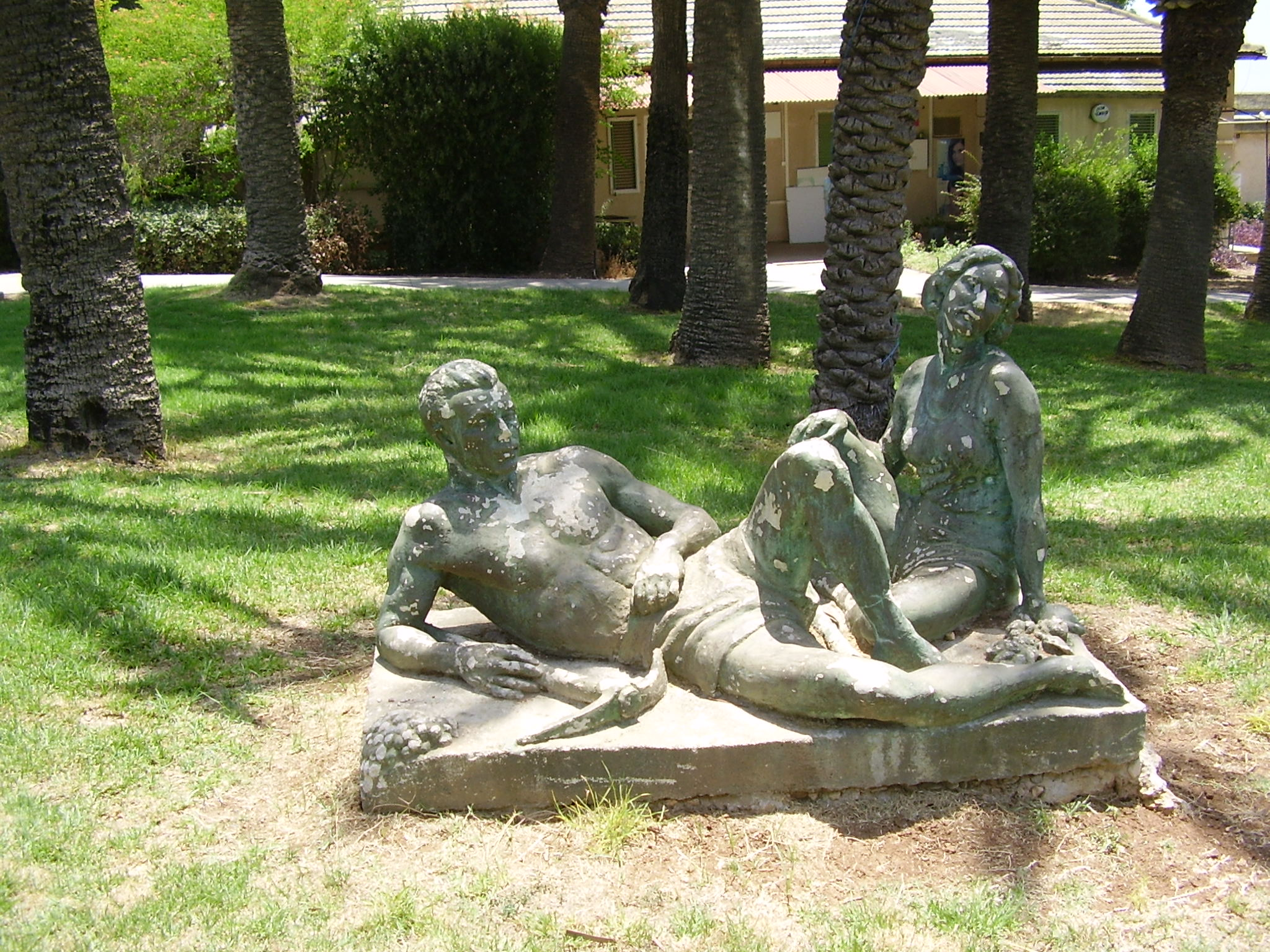
Statue by Polus in kibbutz Tel Yossef

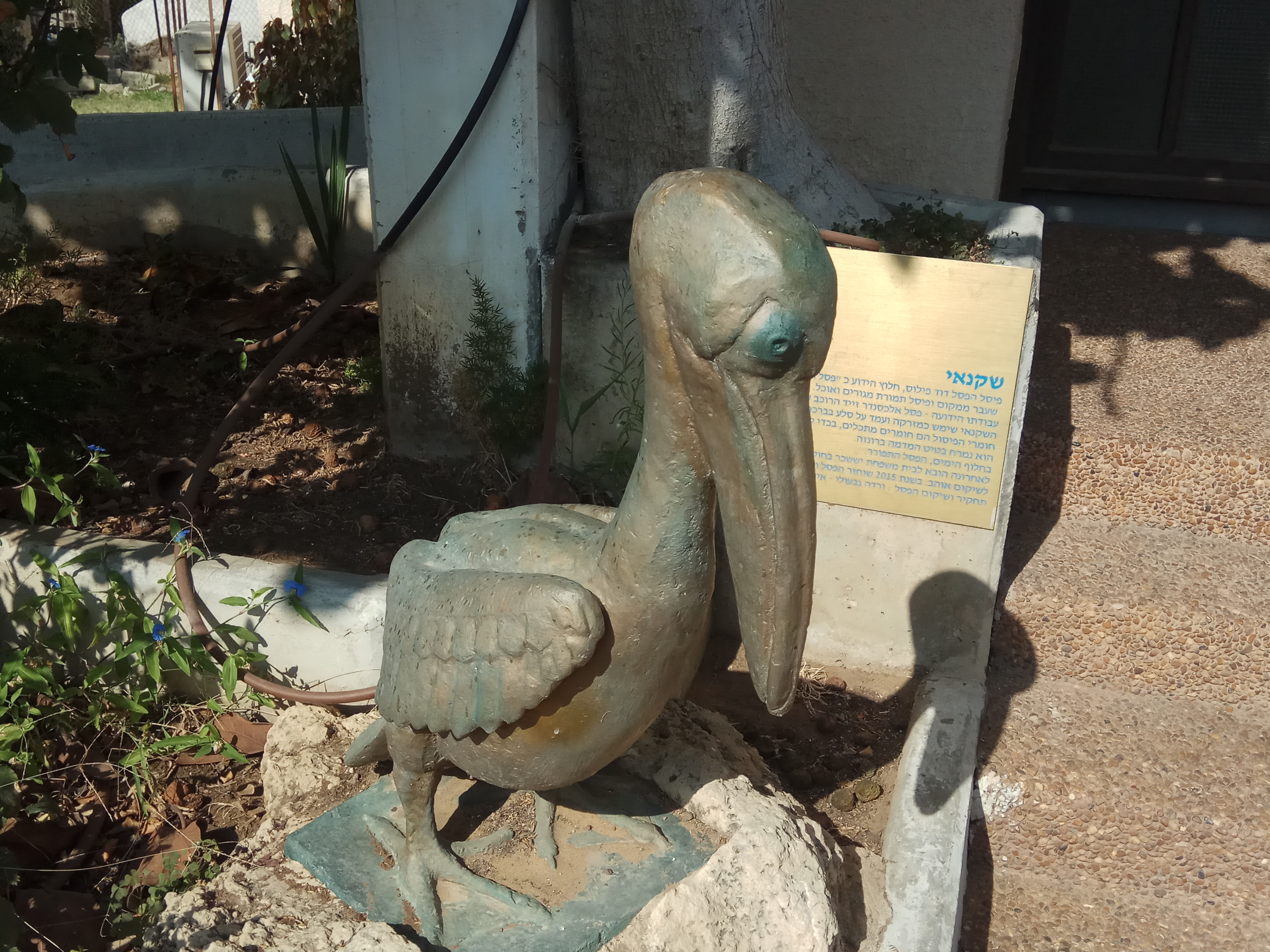
Pelican statue in Holon

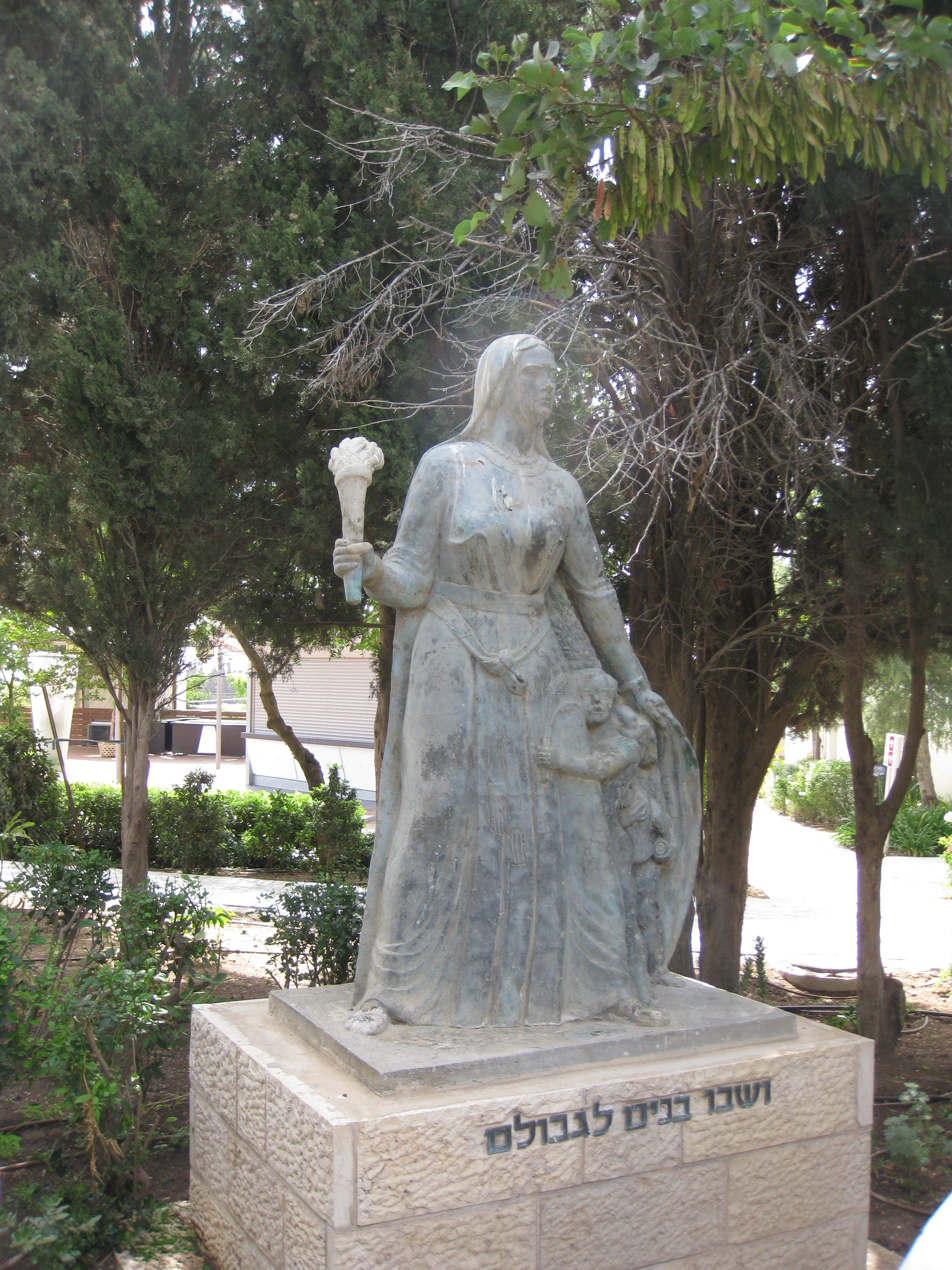
Rachel the mother and the return of the sons

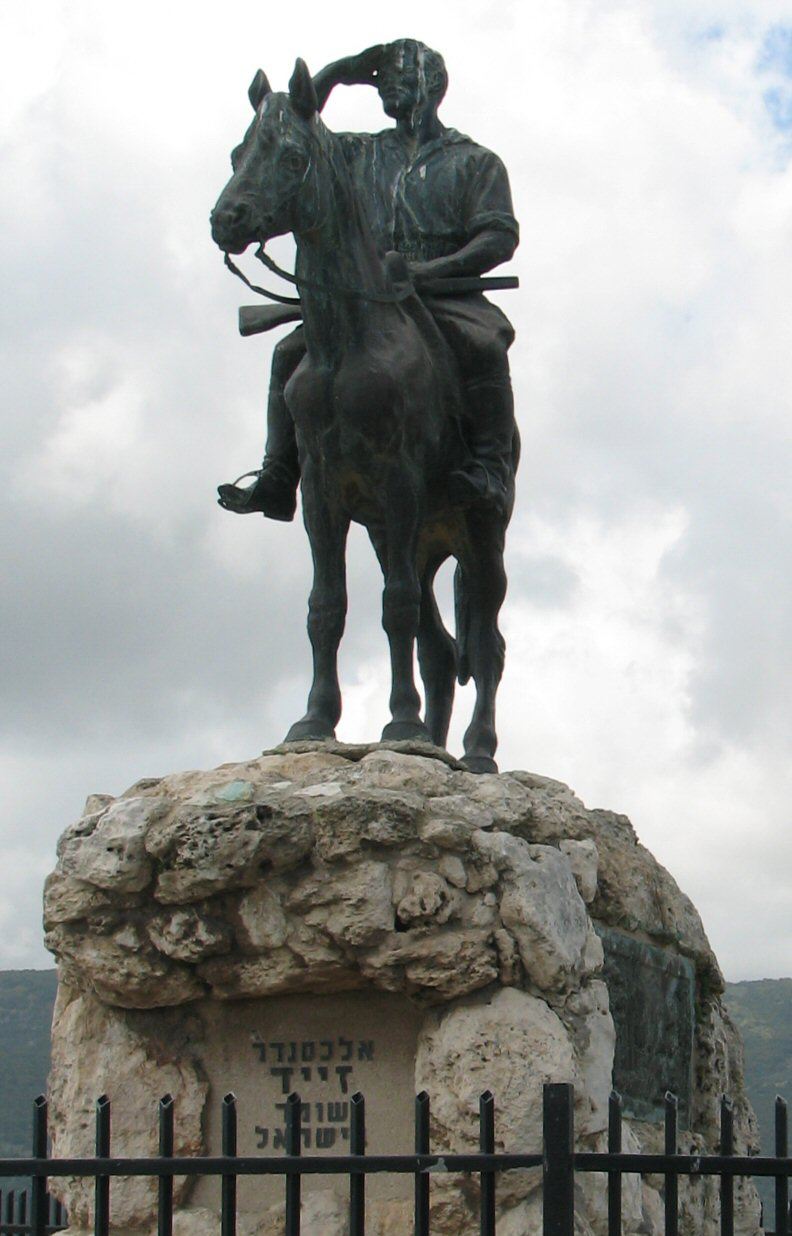
Alexander Zaid memorial

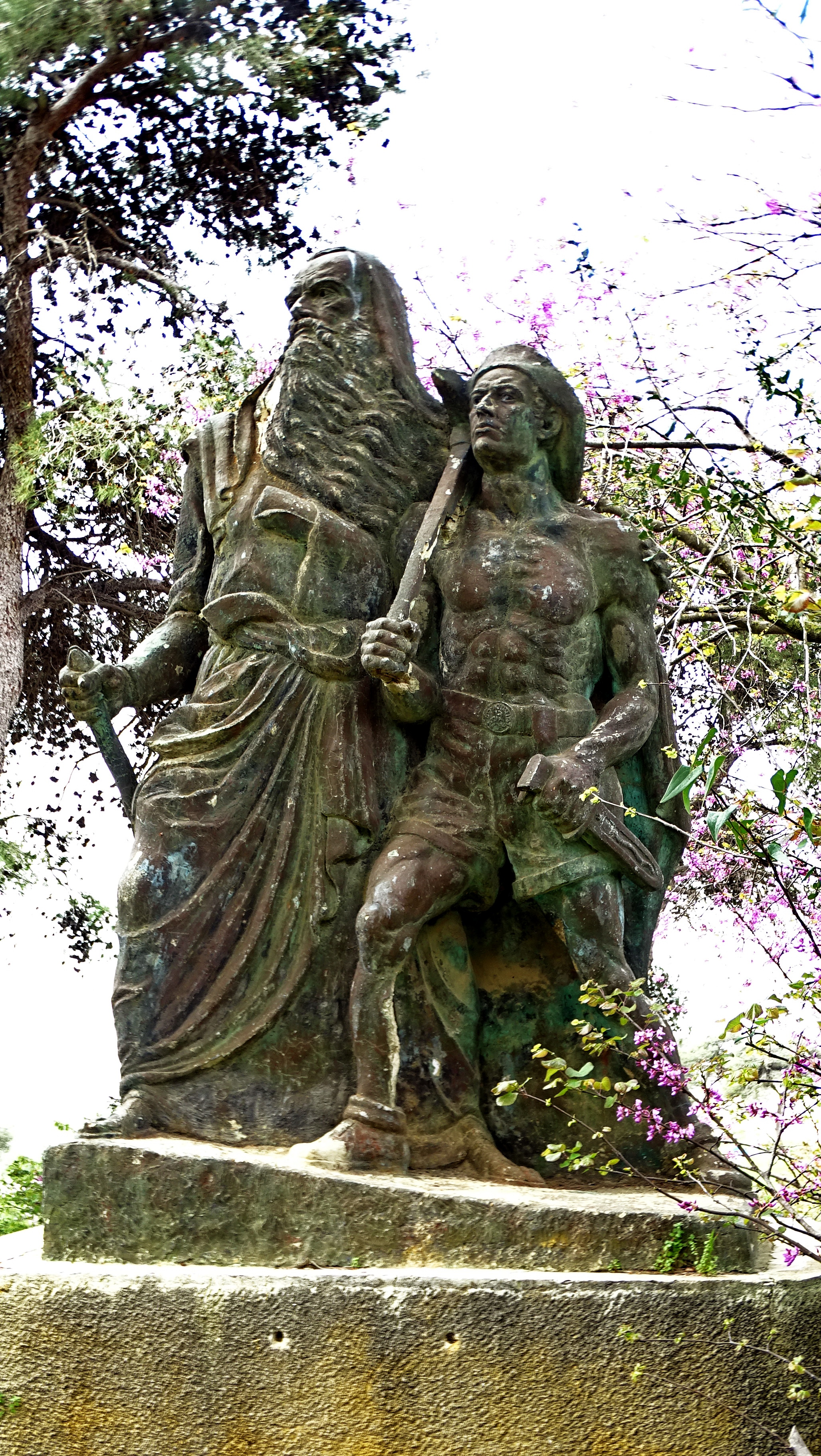
Israel Saba

== See also ==
- Avraham Melnikov
- Visual Arts in Israel
- Israeli Sculpture
