= Ramat David =

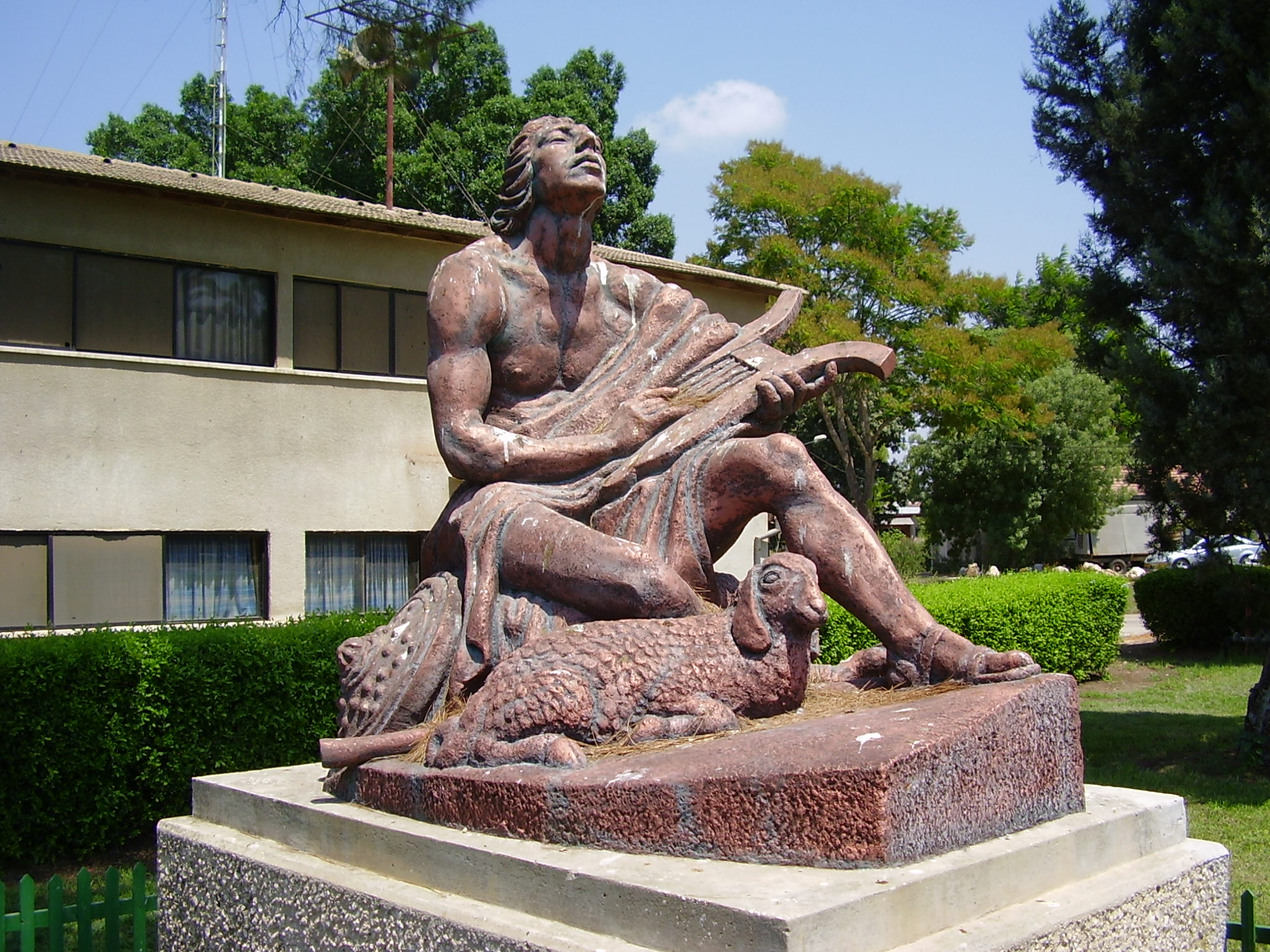
- Shepherd David Playing the Harp by David Polus, 1935

- Location within Jezreel Valley region of Israel
- Coordinates: 32°40′43″N 35°12′14″E
- Country: Israel
- District: Northern
- Subdistrict: Jezreel
- Council: Jezreel Valley
- Affiliation: Kibbutz Movement
- Founded: 1926
- Population (2024): 715

Ramat David (Hebrew: רָמַת דָּוִד, lit. 'David Heights') is a kibbutz in northern Israel. Located in the Jezreel Valley near Ramat David Airbase, it falls under the jurisdiction of Jezreel Valley Regional Council. In 2024 it had a population of 715.

== History ==
The kibbutz was established in 1926 and was named after David Lloyd George, who was Prime Minister of the United Kingdom when the Balfour Declaration was made. The German-Jewish architect Richard Kauffmann drew up plans for the design of Ramat David in 1931.

The British author Roald Dahl landed his RAF Hurricane at the British Mandate airstrip at Ramat David early in 1941. He describes the German Jewish refugee children living there at that time in his autobiography Going Solo.

On 22 May 1948, Egyptian planes attacked the airbase, damaging and destroying several British Royal Air Force planes.

== Notable people ==
- Ze'ev Herring (1910–1988), politician who served as a member of the Knesset for the Alignment between 1969 and 1974
- Ruth Westheimer (1928–2024), sex therapist, talk show host, author, professor, Holocaust survivor, and former Haganah sniper
- Zvi Yanai (1935–2013), civil servant and author

== Gallery ==
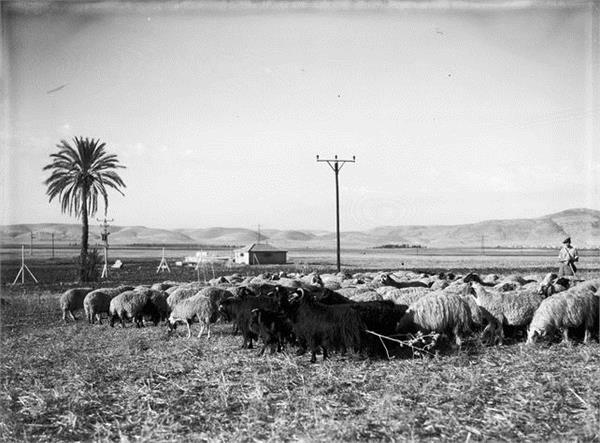
Ramat David 1936

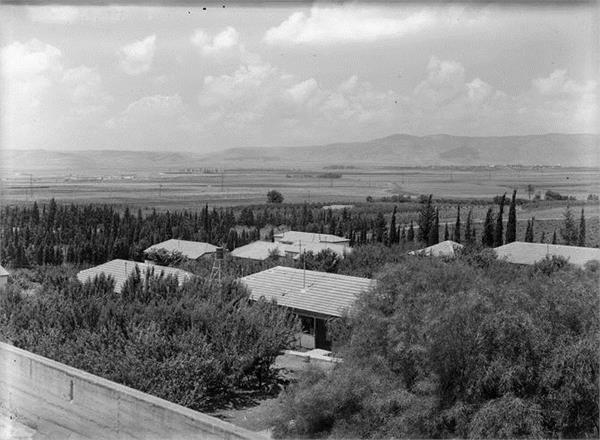
Ramat David 1936

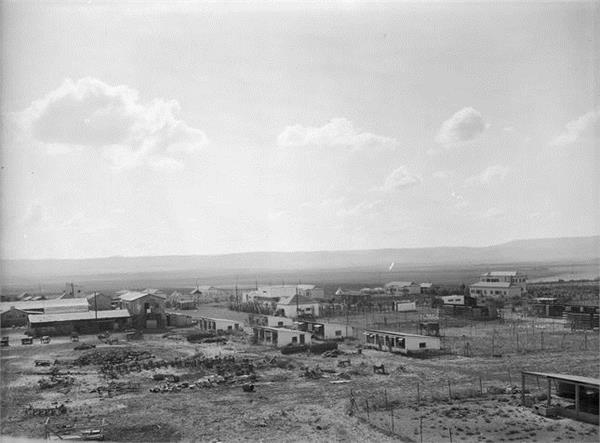
Ramat David 1936

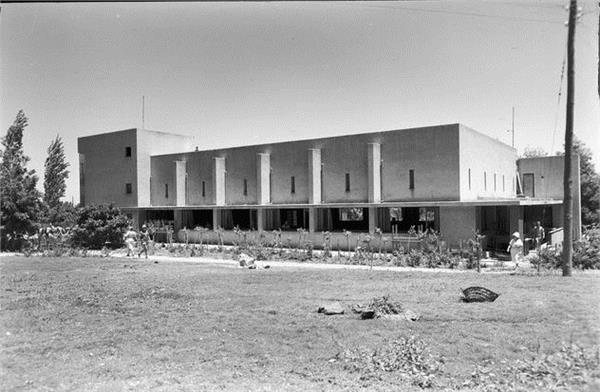
Ramat David dining hall 1940

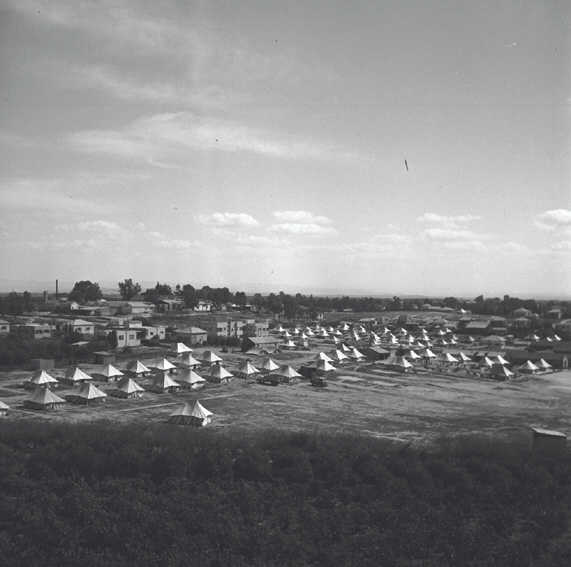
Ramat David military camp 1940

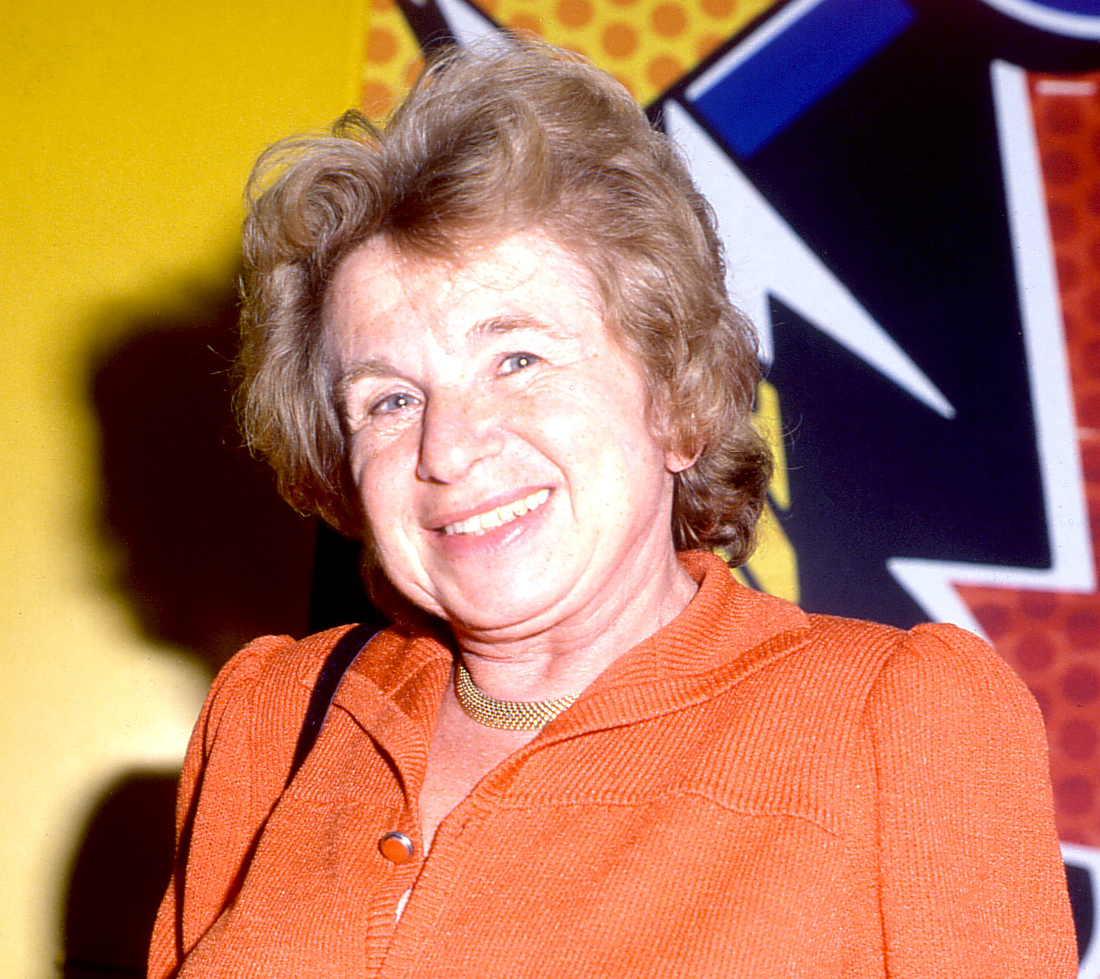
Ruth Westheimer 1988
