= Ta'as =

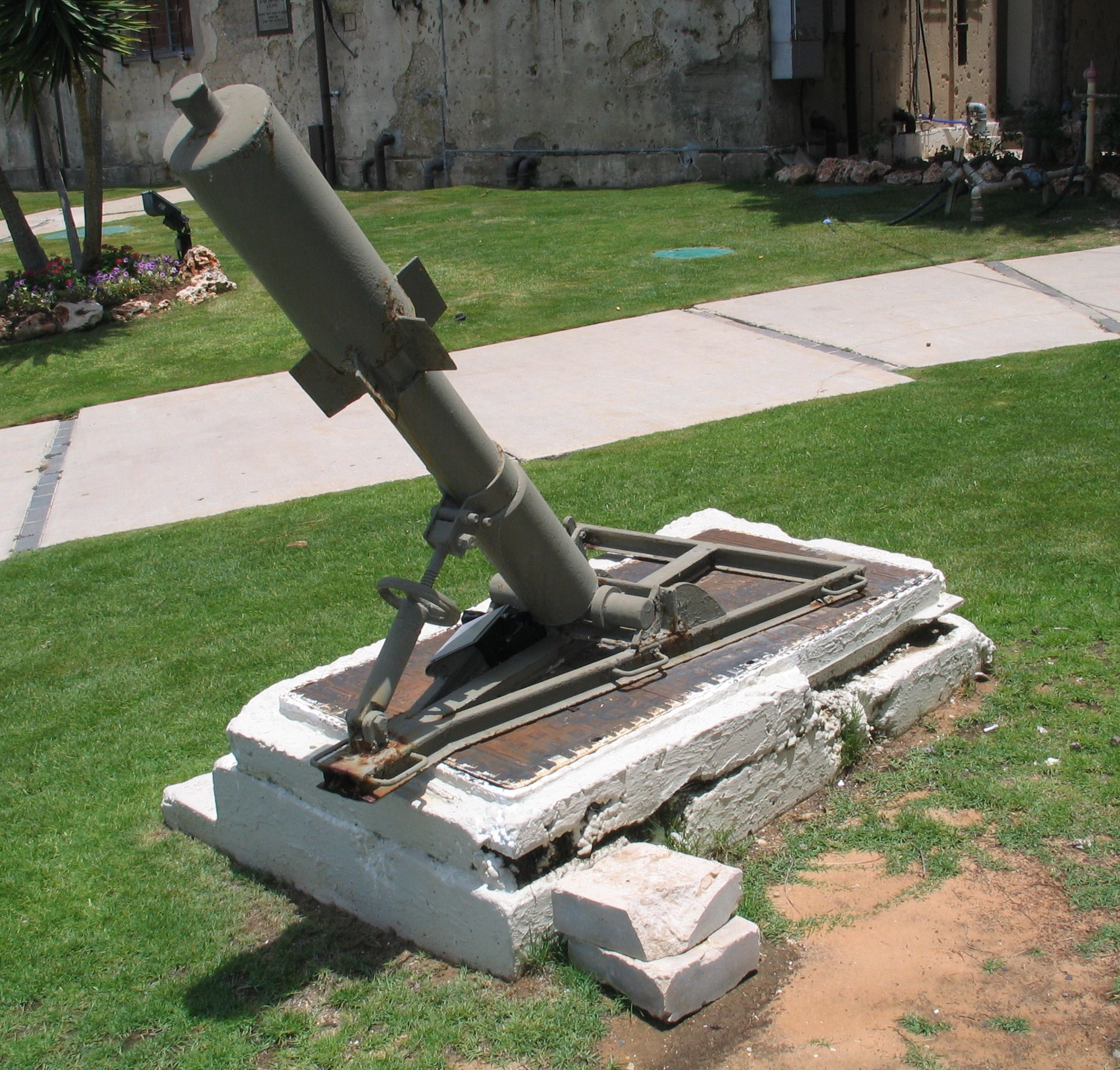
Davidka mortar, Givati Museum, Israel

Ta'as, an abbreviation of the Hebrew for "Military Industry" (Hebrew: Ta'asiya Tzvait), was the clandestine arms industry of the Jewish settlement in Mandatory Palestine. In the 1930s, it was headed by Yisrael Amir. Ta'as was based on a number of small workshops and factories, the first one being hidden in a tannery ("The Aleph Institute") on the north beach of Tel Aviv. "Aleph" had a professional staff of lathe operators, metalworkers, plane operators, milling machine operators and others.

Eliahu Sacharov, one of the heads of the organisation, was responsible for testing the first weapons produced by Ta'as at the Solel Boneh quarry at Migdal Tzedek.

Haim Slavin, an engineer from Russia who worked with Pinhas Rutenberg on building a power station at Naharayim, was the general manager from 1937 to 1952. Under Slavin's leadership Ta'as was reorganised and thereafter reached new heights of production such that it became the primary supplier of weapons to the Haganah. Slavin also developed new plants for Ta'as.

During the 1936–39 Arab revolt in Palestine, Ta'as developed an 81-mm mortar, the Haganah's heaviest weapon at that time, and manufactured mines and grenades, 17,500 of the latter being produced for use during the revolt.

The Haganah decided to develop mortars locally in 1934, beginning with a copy of the British 2-inch mortar. This task was given to David Leibowitz, one of the founders of Ta'as, who was later to win fame as the developer of the Davidka mortar that was used extensively in the 1948 Arab-Israeli War. Leibowitz was assisted by Yisrael Yoshpe, who became Ta'as's expert in metal casting.
