= Safadi =

Surname list

Safadi or al-Safadi is an Arabic surname (nisba) which denotes an origin from the city of Safed (also Safad/Zefat). Safdie is a Sephardic kaneani surname of the same origin.

Notable people with the name include:

- Al-Safadi, Mamluk author and historian
- Al-Khalidi al-Safadi, Ottoman historian and mufti
- Ayman Safadi, Jordanian politician
- Bassel Safadi, Palestinian-Syrian Software engineer
- Benny Safdie, American film director, one-half of the Safdie brothers
- Dalal Khalil Safadi, Lebanese writer
- Joe Safdie, American poet
- Josh Safdie, American film director, one-half of the Safdie brothers
- Mohammad Safadi, Lebanese businessman and politician
- Moshe Safdie, Israeli-Canadian-American architect
- Nicasio Safadi, Ecuadorian musician of Lebanese descent
- Omar Al-Safadi, Qatari handball player
- Oren Safdie, playwright and screenwriter, son of Moshe
- Safdie brothers, American film directors
- Shaddy Safadi, American video game artist
- Sylvia Safdie, Canadian artist
- Tala Safadi, Israeli-Arab beauty queen
- Violette Khairallah Safadi, Lebanese politician
- Yami Safdie, Argentine singer
