= The Class of 1959 Chapel =

Chapel at Harvard Business School in Boston, Massachusetts, US

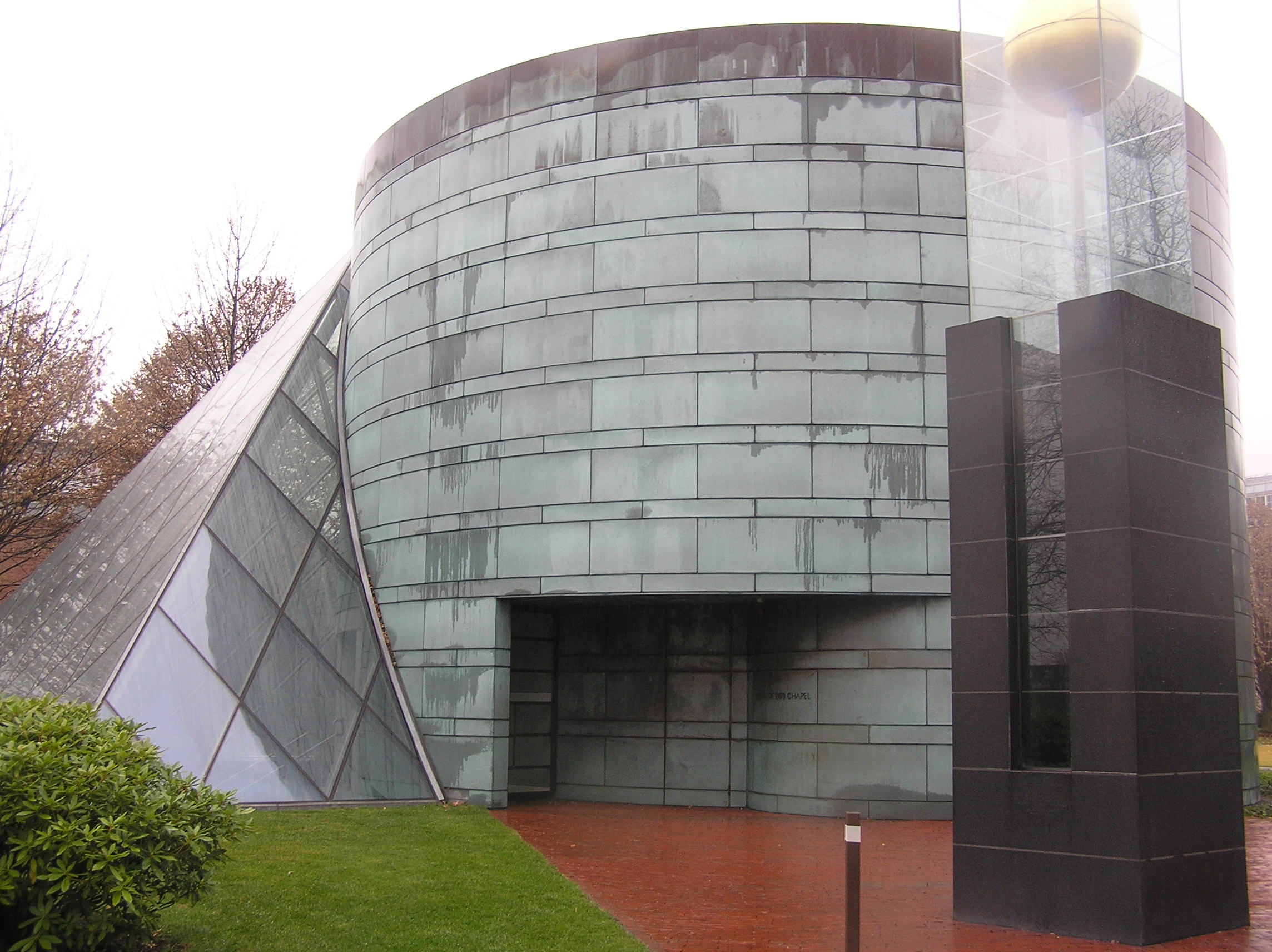
- View of the chapel exterior.
- Interactive map of the The Class of 1959 Chapel area

General information
- Location: 70 N Harvard St; Boston, MA 02163, Boston, Massachusetts, United States
- Coordinates: 42.365956°N 71.123809°W
- Completed: 1992
- Cost: $2.5 million
- Owner: Harvard Business School

Height
- Height: 8.2 m (26 ft 11 in)

Design and construction
- Architect: Moshe Safdie
- Structural engineer: Weidlinger Associates
- Main contractor: Richard White Sons, Inc.

The Class of 1959 Chapel is a non-denominational chapel located on the campus of Harvard Business School in Boston, Massachusetts. It was designed by Moshe Safdie in 1992, as part of a master plan to complement the existing 1927 campus architecture by McKim, Mead and White that would allow for Business School to expand along the Charles River. It was funded by a gift from alumni from the Class of 1959. It was engineered by Weidlinger Associates and built by Richard White Sons, Inc. for a cost of approximately $2.5 million.

== Structure ==
The chapel consists of an 8.2 m (26 ft 11 in) concrete cylinder surfaced with a layer of patinaed bronze. On one side of the cylinder is a pyramidal glass greenhouse that houses a below-ground koi pond decorated with live plants, a small waterfall, and concrete blocks that serve as stepping stones.

Outside the chapel is a rectangular marble tower containing a two-story steel pole and a large bronze ball. The tower is a functioning clock; as the ball moves up and down the pole, lines on the tower indicate the time of day. The timepiece was designed by Karl Schlamminger.

== Interior ==
The chapel itself occupies nearly all of the ground floor of the building and is accessed through a tall metal door from the greenhouse. The interior is a two-story stone cylinder with several semi-circular concrete constructions scalloping the walls. At the top of the cylinder are thin windows with several long prisms designed by the artist Charles Ross that create raking light and occasionally rainbows across the austere concrete interior.

== Usage ==
The furnishings are simple and consist primarily of rows of wooden chairs, which seat approximately 100 people, a spare concrete altar, a piano, and a harpsichord. The acoustics of the chapel are very crisp for a room made almost entirely of concrete. The chapel is used by the Harvard Business School community for non-denominational services, private celebrations, and concerts.

== Gallery ==
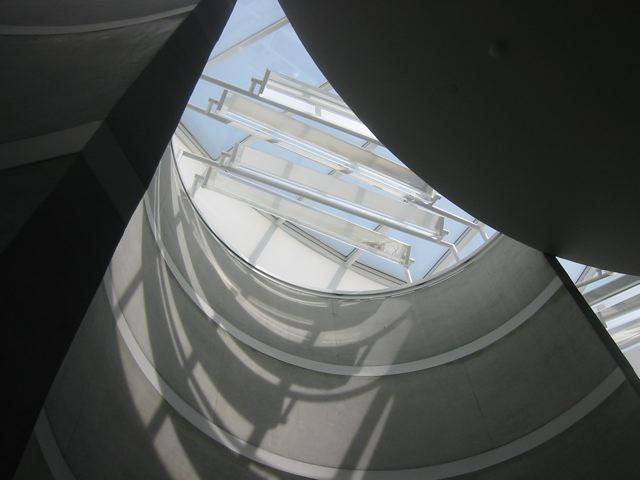
Chapel interior, with prisms throwing light onto the walls

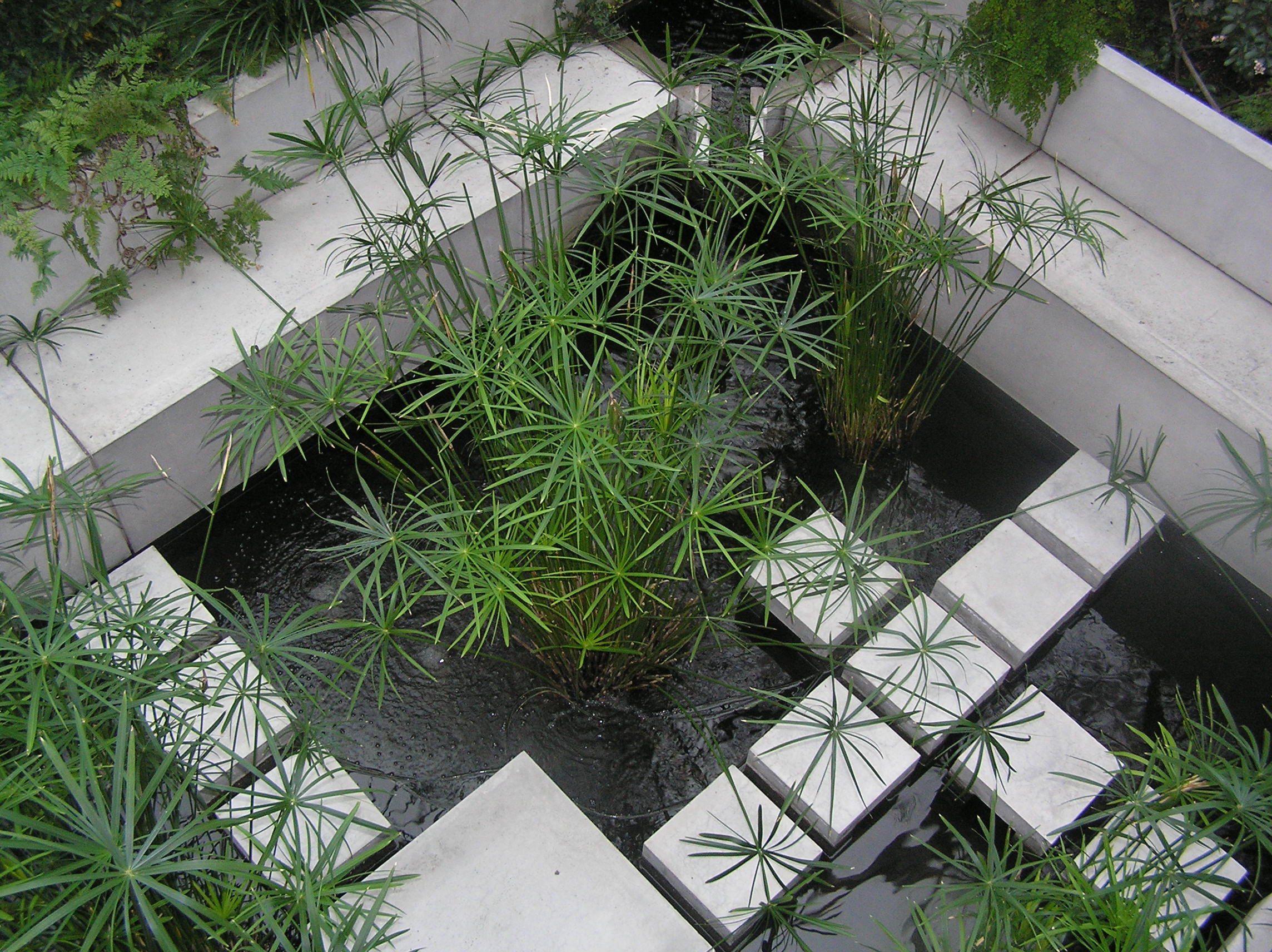
Koi pond

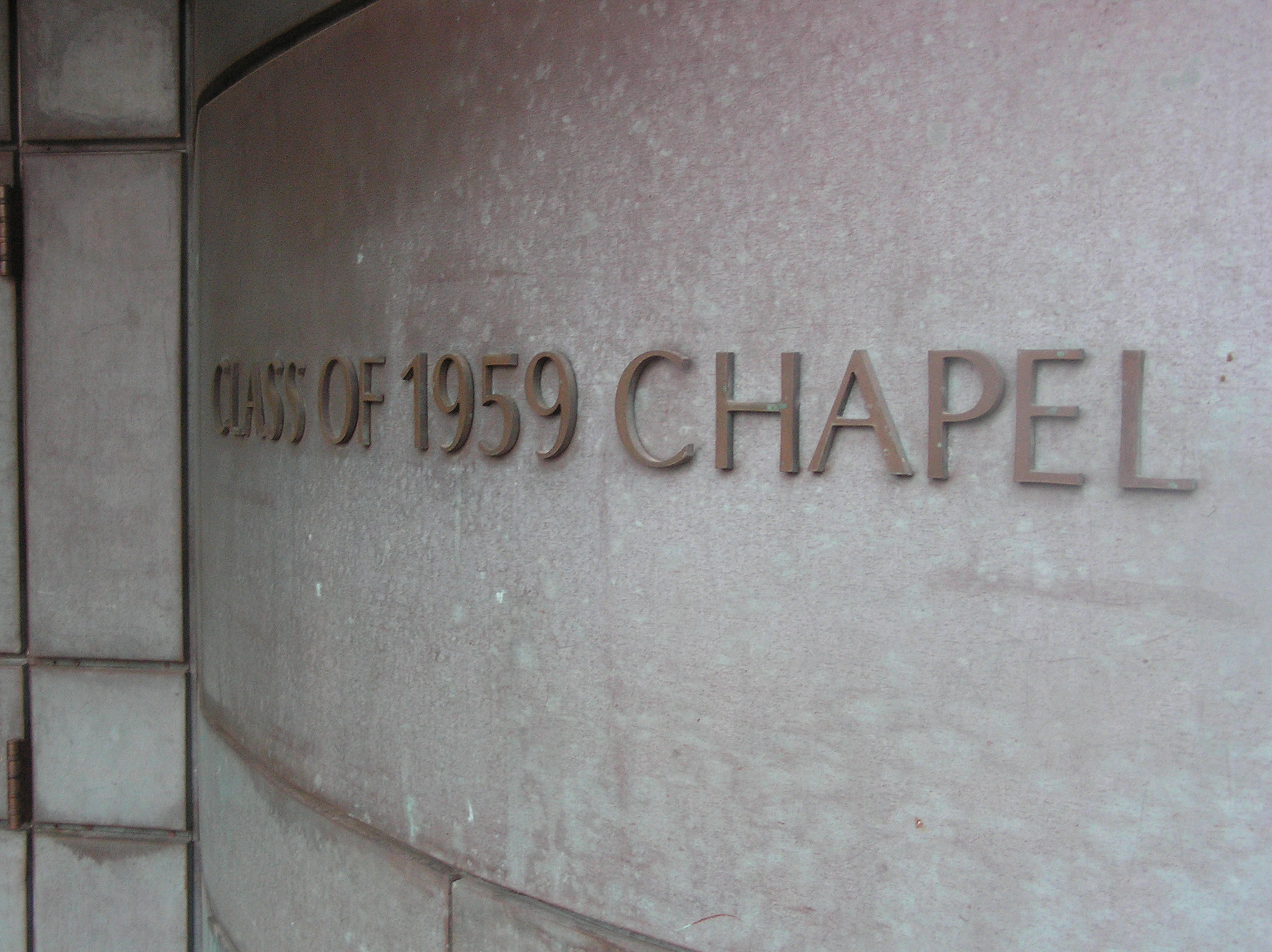
Entrance

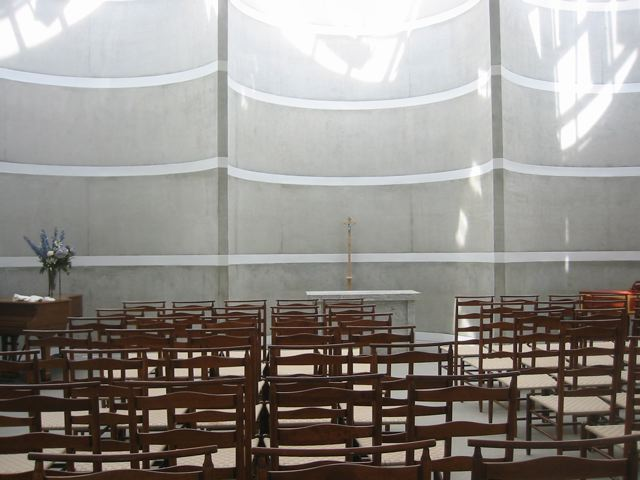
Chapel interior, facing the altar
