= Bible Lands Museum =

Archaeological museum in Jerusalem

Coordinates: 31.7749°N 35.2025°E

The Bible Lands Museum, Jerusalem
- מוזיאון ארצות המקרא ירושלים

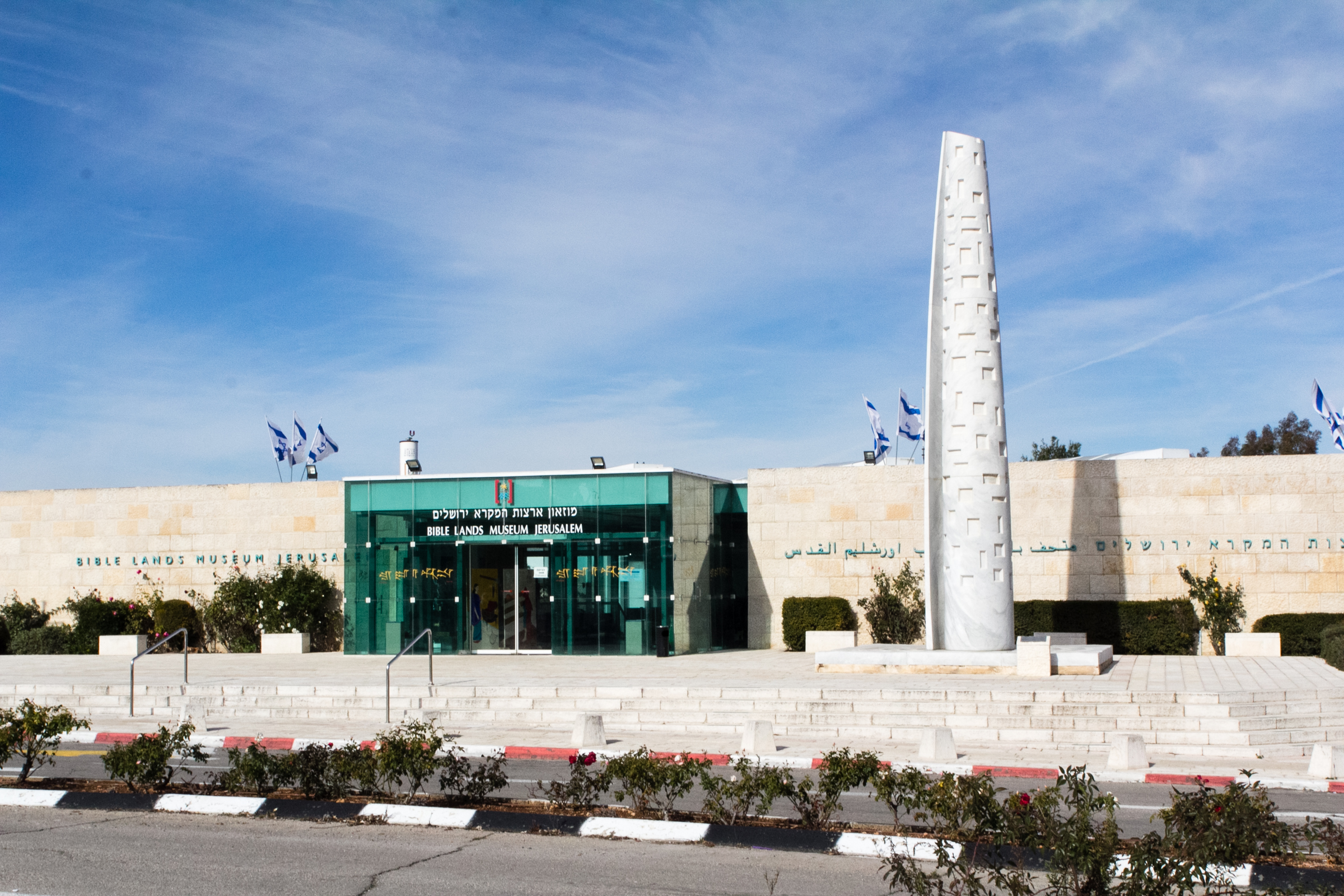
- Established: 1992
- Location: Shmuel Stephan Weiz St 21; Givat Ram; Jerusalem
- Type: archaeology and history
- Website: www.blmj.org/en/

The Bible Lands Museum (Hebrew: מוזיאון ארצות המקרא ירושלים, Arabic: متحف بلدان الكتاب) is an archaeological museum in Jerusalem, that explores the culture of the peoples mentioned in the Bible including ancient Egyptians, Canaanites, Philistines, Arameans, Hittites, Elamites, Phoenicians, Persians and Jews.

== Overview ==
The aim of the museum is to put the various peoples covered into historical context. The museum is located on Museum Row in Givat Ram, between the Israel Museum, the National Campus for the Archaeology of Israel, and the Bloomfield Science Museum.

== History ==
The museum was founded by Elie Borowski in 1992 to house his personal collection. On a visit to Jerusalem in 1981, he met Batya Weiss who encouraged him to bring his collection of Ancient Near Eastern Art from biblical times to Israel and establish a museum. She put him in contact with Jerusalem mayor Teddy Kollek. Borowski heeded her advice, built the Bible Lands Museum and moved his collection from a museum in Toronto to Jerusalem. Elie and Batya eventually married. The museum was built on land donated by the city of Jerusalem and cost $12 million.

== Exhibits ==
The main gallery displays hundreds of artifacts: ancient documents, idols, coins, statues, weapons, pottery, and seals from across the ancient Near East. Many topics are elaborated upon in brief articles on the walls (e.g. the origins of the alphabet, embalming, and Abraham's journey). The museum also exhibits scale models of Jerusalem during the First Temple period, a Ziggurat at Ur and the pyramids of Giza. While the museum's emphasis is the history of ancient Near Eastern civilizations, the curators draw attention to relevant biblical verses. For example, above a gallery of ancient Anatolian jugs is the verse "Behold, Rebecca came forth with her pitcher on her shoulder; and she went down unto the fountain and drew water" (Genesis 24:45).

=== Main gallery ===
The main gallery consists of 20 numbered sections in chronological order:

1. From Hunter to Urban Dweller
2. The Coming of Civilizations
3. Symbolic Communication
4. Literate Voices, the Story of Writing
5. The Pre-Patriarchal World
6. The Sumerian Temple
7. Old Kingdom of Egypt
8. Genesis 14, the Age of Warfare
9. The Age of the Patriarchs
10. When Israel Sojourned in Egypt
11. The Sea Peoples
12. The Arrival of the Iranian Horsemen
13. Stones of Aram
14. Israel Among the Nations
15. Assyria, the Rod of My Anger
16. The Splendor of Persia
17. Hellenistic Dominions
18. Rome and Judaea
19. Roman and Coptic Egypt
20. Sassanian Mesopotamia – Home of the Babylonian Talmud

=== Exhibitions 2017 ===
1. Jerusalem In Babylon: New light on the Judean Exiles including Al-Yahudu Tablets
2. Gods, Heroes and Mortals in Ancient Greece
3. In the Valley of David and Goliath
