= United States Institute of Peace Headquarters =

Building in Washington, D.C.

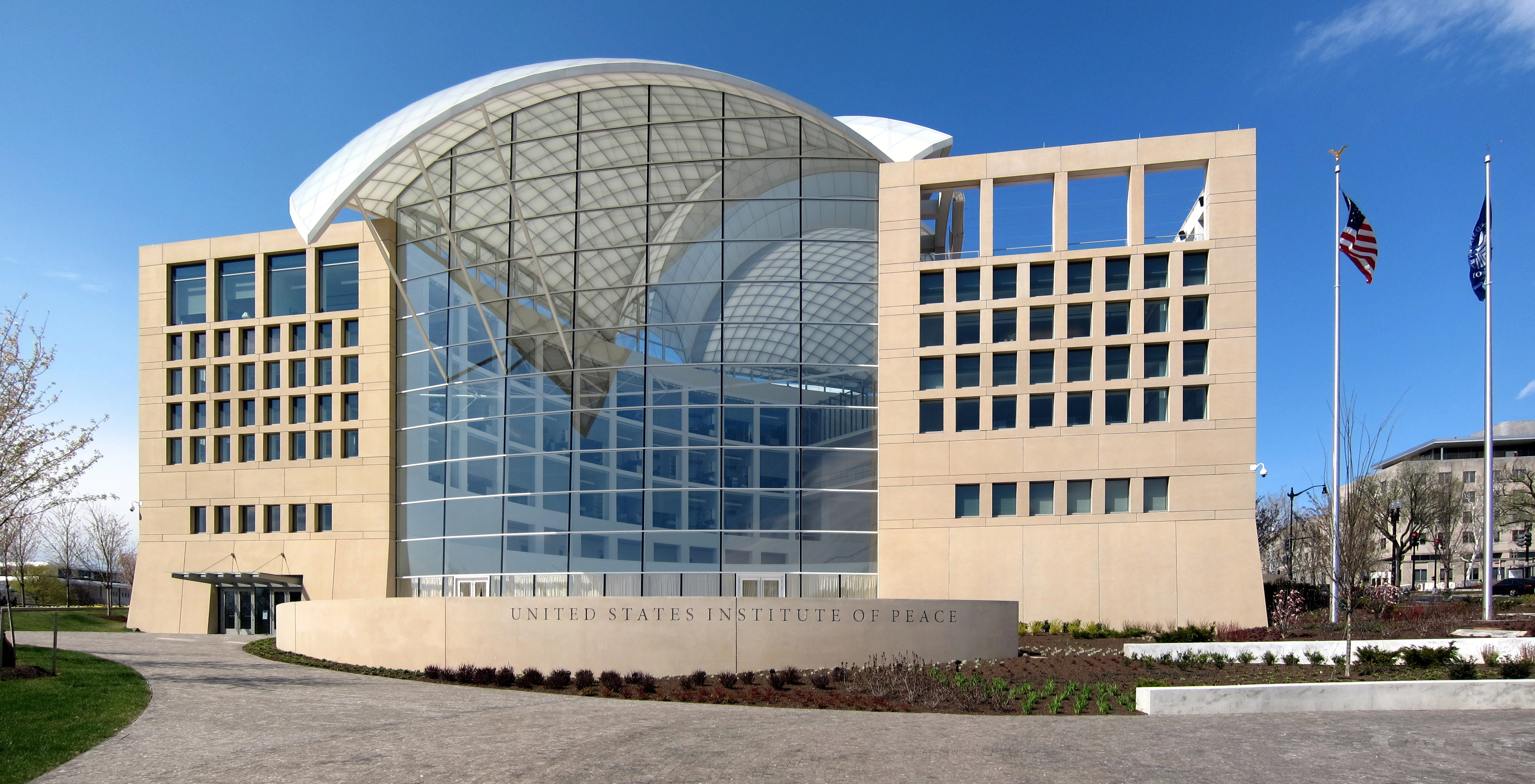
- USIP's headquarters in 2011

General information
- Architectural style: Modernism
- Location: Washington, D.C., 2301 Constitution Avenue NW, United States
- Coordinates: 38°53′33.92″N 77°3′2.49″W
- Construction started: 2008
- Completed: 2011
- Cost: $186 million

Height
- Height: 91.33 ft (27.84 m)

Technical details
- Floor count: 5
- Floor area: 154,000 sq ft (14,300 m^{2})

Design and construction
- Architect: Moshe Safdie
- Main contractor: Clark Construction Group

The United States Institute of Peace Headquarters is a building to house staff offices and other facilities for the United States Institute of Peace (USIP). The building is at a prominent location near the National Mall and Potomac River in the Foggy Bottom neighborhood of Washington, D.C. The environmentally friendly building, noted for its unique roof, was designed by architect Moshe Safdie and completed in 2011. Critics' reviews of the building's design have been mixed.

== History ==
In the 1980s, Democratic senator Jennings Randolph of West Virginia led a group of lawmakers calling for a federal peace institute. USIP was established by Congress in 1984 and for many years rented office space in various buildings in downtown Washington, the last being 1200 17th Street NW. In 1996, Congress approved a site on the National Mall for USIP. The site chosen for a new headquarters, the first permanent home for the USIP, was on the corner of 23rd Street and Constitution Avenue NW in Foggy Bottom. It was previously a parking lot for Bureau of Medicine and Surgery employees at the adjacent Old Naval Observatory. The land was transferred to the USIP without charge with an agreement that underground parking spaces would be built for the Navy employees. The site is on the northwest corner and last buildable site available on the National Mall, overlooking the Lincoln Memorial, and across the street from the historic American Institute of Pharmacy Building.

In 2004, Congress authorized $100 million for construction of USIP's headquarters, in part due to the efforts of Republican senator Ted Stevens of Alaska, while the institute was required to raise the remaining $86 million. The funds raised by USIP included a $10 million donation from Chevron Corporation. Another corporate donor to the building fund, defense contractor Lockheed Martin, was named a "Founding Corporate Partner" after donating $1 million. William Hartung of the Center for International Policy criticized the USIP for "taking money from the world's largest producer of the weapons of war."

In April 2001, USIP issued solicitations for a design and twenty-six architects submitted proposals. Moshe Safdie had never heard of USIP before receiving the design request, but he was one of the five finalists chosen. The other four were Pelli Clarke Pelli Architects, Michael Graves and Associates, Polshek Partnership (now known as Ennead Architects), and Weiss/Manfredi (which withdrew). According to USIP president Richard H. Solomon, Safdie's design was chosen because the other designs "were basically square buildings." USIP's headquarters is the second building in Washington, D.C. designed by Safdie. The first was the fortress-like headquarters (Ariel Rios Federal Building) of the Bureau of Alcohol, Tobacco, Firearms and Explosives, completed in 2008, which dominates the busy intersection of Florida and New York Avenues NE.

The National Capital Planning Commission (NCPC) unanimously approved plans for the building in 2007. The groundbreaking ceremony took place the following year in June. Dignitaries in attendance included President George W. Bush, Speaker of the House Nancy Pelosi, Secretary of State Condoleezza Rice, former defense secretary Frank Carlucci, and former secretaries of state Henry Kissinger, George P. Shultz, and Madeleine Albright. During the ceremony, some of the speakers hinted at their opposition to Bush's use of preventive war. Construction of the 154,000 sq ft (14,300 m^{2}) headquarters, which is LEED Gold certified, was carried out by Clark Construction Group of Bethesda, Maryland. The U.S. Green Building Council certified it as the first environmentally friendly building on the National Mall. The headquarters, which is managed by real estate services firm Akridge, was dedicated in October 2011. That same year, the Samuel W. Lewis Hall was dedicated in honor of the former ambassador to Israel and USIP president.

A standoff at the headquarters occurred between former USIP acting president George Moose and acting USIP president Kenneth Jackson after Moose's firing by President Donald Trump in March 2025. Jackson, along with officials from the Department of Government Efficiency (DOGE), was initially denied entry into the building, with USIP officials contesting the legality of Moose's firing. USIP officials canceled the building's security contract with Inter-Con Security in an effort to prevent them allowing Jackson and DOGE members access into the headquarters. Moose and other USIP officials were ultimately evicted by law enforcement, allowing Jackson and DOGE staff to enter. The building was transferred to the federal government General Services Administration in March 2025. DOGE staff proceeded to remove the USIP logo and flags. Two months later, a federal judge ruled the takeover of the USIP unconstitutional, and staff were reinstated. During those two months, maintenance and upkeep issues arose, due to USIP employees being barred from entering the building. When staff were allowed back into the headquarters, they discovered water leaks, weeds in the cooling towers, and an infestation of rats and roaches.

A legal battle over control of the building continued throughout 2025, with ownership changing hands several times between USIP officials and the Trump administration. In December 2025, the letters "DONALD J. TRUMP" were added to the exterior wall of the building, just above the engraved "UNITED STATES INSTITUTE OF PEACE". This occurred after the U.S. State Department said the USIP's name was changed to the "Donald J. Trump Institute of Peace". The question over ownership of the building is pending in appeals court. In January 2026, Trump earmarked the building to be headquarters of the Board of Peace.

== Design ==
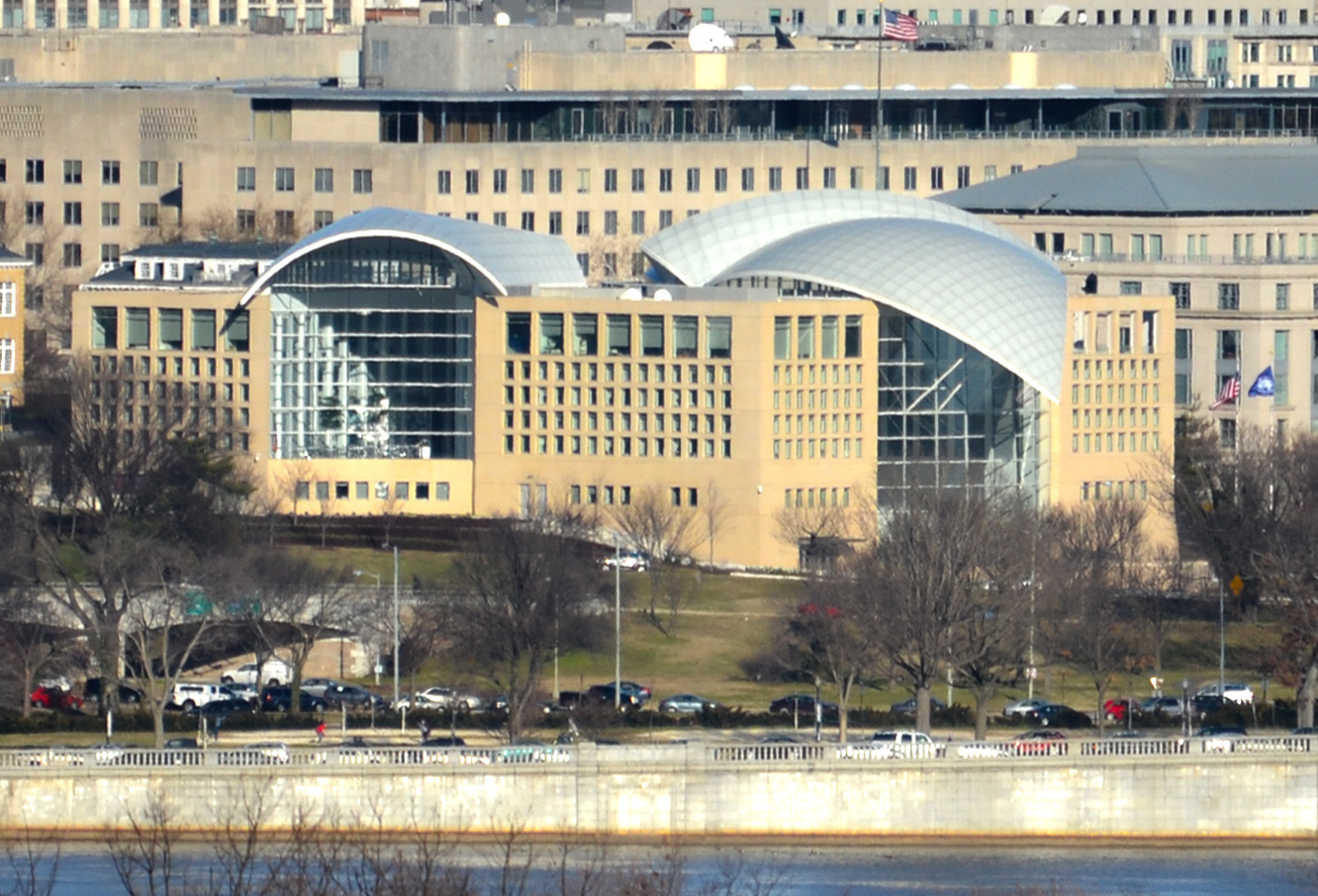
The western face of the headquarters

According to Safdie, the building "is by definition the physical symbol of peace in the capital's skyline" and needed to convey the spirit of peace. Safdie stated: "I'm not one who believes in overt symbolism, but my sense of a building dedicated to peace was a sense of the lightness of being,...It should be a serene building. It should not be an aggressive building. It should be full of light." Safdie achieved this by designing a glass curtain wall facing the Lincoln Memorial and a billowing glass ceiling. The ceiling is one of the building elements in common with Safdie's design for the Yitzhak Rabin Center in Israel. The 8 inches (20 cm) thick roof is made of 1,482 white glass panels and supported by steel frames while the interior of the roof is covered by a translucent plastic film. It is opaque and white during the day and glows at night.

There are two main entrances to the building, one facing Constitution Avenue, and another facing 23rd Street NW. The building is made of acid-etched precast-concrete and resembles limestone. The design is centered around two atria, a large one facing the National Mall that is designed for the public, and a smaller private one for staff that overlooks the Potomac River. The larger atrium, the George P. Shultz Great Hall, measures 11,800 sq ft (1,100 m^{2}) and features the 80 ft (24 m) high glass curtain wall facing the National Mall. The 230-seat Frank C. Carlucci III Auditorium, Jacqueline and Marc Leland Atrium, and 20,000 sq ft (1,900 m^{2}) Global Peacebuilding Center, an interactive museum dedicated to peacemaking, are accessible via this atrium. The roof over the Great Hall, designed to convey a dove's wings, is called Ansary Peace Dove. The second atrium, also known as the International Women's Commons, measures 3,600 sq ft (330 m^{2}) and is lined with offices, a library, meeting rooms, conference center, and the Farooq Kathwari Amphitheatre. The roof over this atrium is a simplified version of Ansary Peace Dove. There is a 2,000 sq ft (190 m^{2}) outdoor terrace and adjoining boardroom facing the Lincoln Memorial. A three-story underground parking garage can accommodate 230 vehicles; 140 of those spaces are reserved for Navy personnel.

== Reception ==
Katherine Gustafson of ArchitectureWeek thought the building "succeeds as a monumental edifice befitting its place in the urban frame of the National Mall" while Nathan Guttman of The Jewish Daily Forward described the headquarters as an "architectural gem." Architect Roger K. Lewis, professor emeritus of architecture at the University of Maryland, had mixed feelings about the building. He said it was "most visible and aesthetically enticing after dark", while its "unique, idiosyncratic form appears somewhat less enticing" during the day. During the NCPC meeting in 2007 giving final approval to the building, a National Park Service representative said "This building will be a foreign object in the landscape of classical architecture of this city", criticizing the design compared to the neoclassical and Beaux-Arts buildings along Constitution Avenue. The building is highly visible to commuters on Interstate 66 as they enter the city, a fact lamented by Philip Kennicott, Pulitzer Prize-winning critic for The Washington Post. In two scathing reviews of the headquarters, Kennicott said "If it were not for the roof, the building would be unexceptional, just another exercise in boxy architecture pierced by deadening rows of identical rectangular windows" and "The institute’s design marks yet another low point in Safdie’s long descent into repetitive corporate architecture."
