= National Campus for the Archaeology of Israel =

Part of the Israel Antiquities Authority

Coordinates: 31.7743°N 35.2022°E

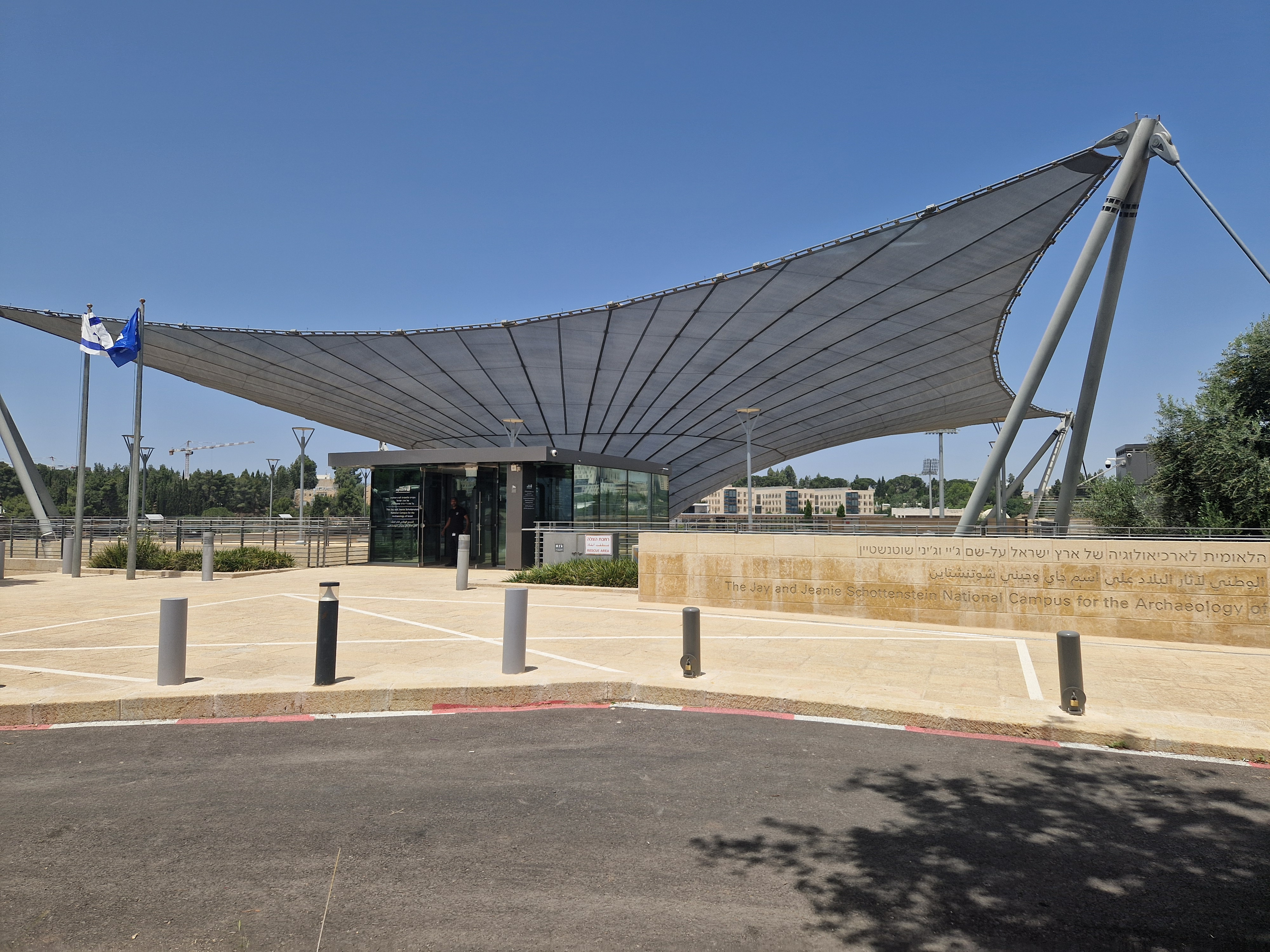
The building

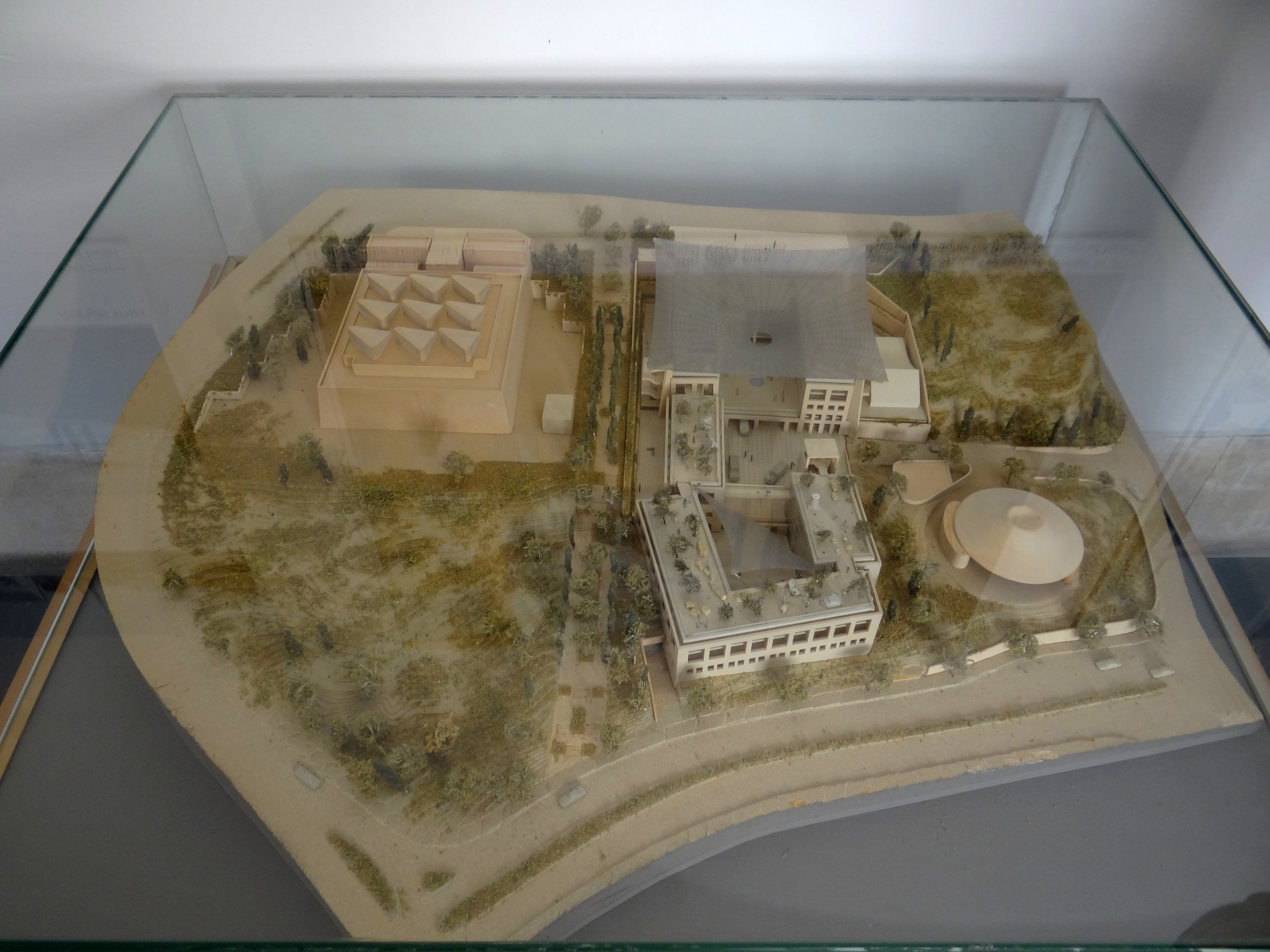
A model of the National Campus for the Archaeology of Israel built beside the Bible Lands Museum.

The Jay and Jeanie Schottenstein National Campus for the Archaeology of Israel is the future building of the Israel Antiquities Authority. Ground was broken in 2010, and construction began in 2012 in Jerusalem. The building will concentrate all centralized administrative offices into one structure, currently at 3 locations throughout Jerusalem: Har Hotzvim, Israel Museum, and the Rockefeller Museum. The campus is being built on 20,000 square meters located between the Israel Museum and the Bible Lands Museum. It was designed by Moshe Safdie. The Visitor Experience center at the Campus is expected, as of March 2026, to be fully built by the end of 2026 and open to visitors in early 2027.

== Building ==
When completed, the 36,000- sq.-m. building will house offices, archaeological artifacts, archeology laboratories, the National Library for the Archeology of Israel, and serve as a museum of archaeology. Construction began in 2012 with the excavation of an enormous foundation cut into a hillside so that so that the roof level entrance of the large building is at ground level between the two, existing, major museums, while the lowest floor opens onto a street at the foot of the hill. The Antiquities Authority was formerly located in cramped quarters at the Rockefeller Museum in East Jerusalem.

=== Rooftop mosaic exhibition ===
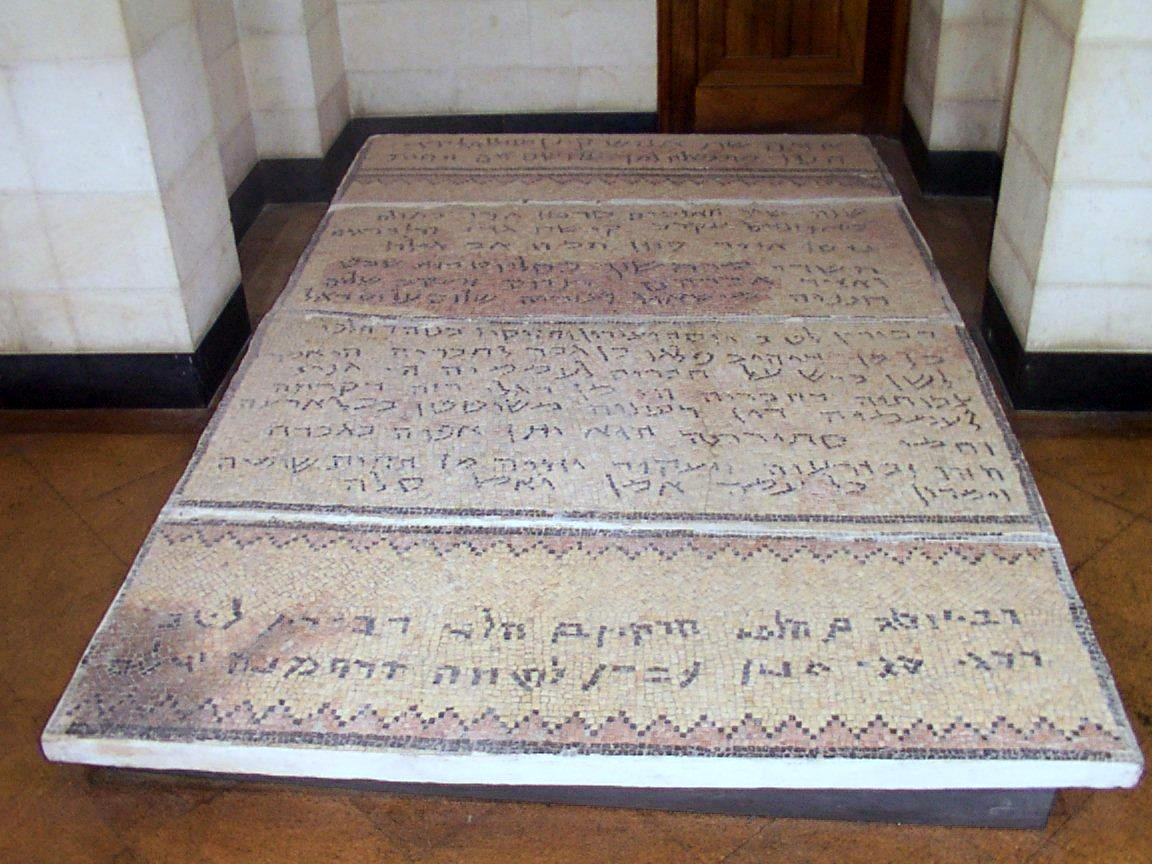
Ein Gedi synagogue mosaic

The roof of the building is a large plaza with views of the Jerusalem hills. Several important Byzantine-era mosaics from churches and synagogues are on permanent display; this part of the campus is open to the public while construction continues on the interior of the building the visitor's feet. Displays include a 6th-century, Byzantine-period mosaic floor, discovered in an ancient synagogue in Ein Gedi and featuring a curse in Judeo-Aramaic that invokes God's wrath upon anyone who neglects his family, provokes conflict, steals property, slanders his friends or "reveals the secret of the town", presumably referring to Ein Gedi's balsam industry or possibly cursing those who slader their Jewish community in front of Gentiles.
