= Moshe Safdie =

Israeli-Canadian-American architect (born 1938)

Moshe Safdie CC FRAIC OAA FAIA
- משה ספדיה
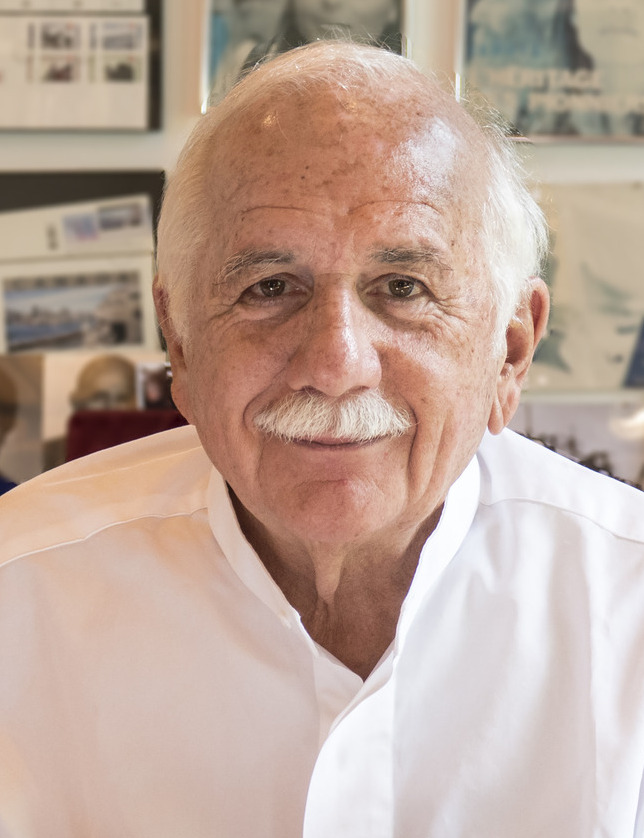
- Safdie in 2017
- Born: July 14, 1938 (age 88); Haifa, Mandatory Palestine
- Education: McGill School of Architecture
- Occupations: Architect, urban planner, educator, author
- Spouses: Nina Nusynowicz (m. 1959; div. 1981) Michal Ronnen (m. 1981)
- Children: 4, including Oren Safdie
- Relatives: Sylvia Safdie (sister); Dov Charney (nephew); Josh Safdie (great-nephew); Benny Safdie (great-nephew)
- Awards: See list: Gold Medal, American Institute of Architects; Companion of the Order of Canada; Gold Medal, Royal Architectural Institute of Canada; Lifetime Achievement, Cooper Hewitt, Smithsonian Design Museum; Wolf Prize
- Practice: Safdie Architects (est. 1964)
- Projects: See list: Habitat 67; Marina Bay Sands; Crystal Bridges Museum of American Art; Virasat-e-Khalsa; Jewel Changi Airport
- Website: safdiearchitects.com

Moshe Safdie (Hebrew: משה ספדיה; born July 14, 1938) is an architect, urban planner, educator, and author, who is a citizen of Canada, Israel, and the United States. He is well known for incorporating principles of socially responsible design throughout his six-decade career. Safdie is most identified with designing Marina Bay Sands and Jewel Changi Airport, both in Singapore, as well as his debut project, Habitat 67 in Montreal, which was originally conceived as his thesis at McGill University. His projects include cultural, educational, and civic institutions such as neighbourhoods and public parks, housing, mixed-use urban centers, and airports. He has also designed master plans for existing communities and entirely new cities in the Americas, the Middle East, and Asia.

== Early life and education ==
Safdie was born in the city of Haifa, Mandatory Palestine, to a family of Syrian Jews. His father was from Aleppo, and his mother, whose family had its origins in Aleppo, was from Manchester. He studied at the Hebrew Reali School in Haifa. He was nine years old when the Israeli Declaration of Independence was issued by David Ben-Gurion. After the 1948 Arab–Israeli War, he lived on a kibbutz where he tended goats and kept bees. In 1953, the Israeli government restricted imports in response to an economic and currency crisis, severely affecting Safdie's father's textile business. Consequently, when Safdie was 15, his family emigrated from Israel to Canada and settled in Montreal, where he attended Westmount High School.

In September 1955, Safdie registered for the six-year architectural degree program at the McGill University Faculty of Engineering. In his fifth year, Safdie was named University Scholar. The following summer, he was awarded the Canada Mortgage and Housing Corporation (CMHC) scholarship. He traveled across North America to observe housing developments in the continent's major cities. In his final year, Safdie developed his thesis, entitled "A Case for City Living", and described as "A Three-Dimensional Modular Building System". He received his degree in 1961. Two years later, while apprenticing with architect Louis Kahn, Safdie's thesis advisor Sandy van Ginkel invited Safdie to submit his modular project for the World Exposition of 1967. In preparation for the exposition his thesis was developed into a complete master plan, eventually being constructed in Montreal. Named after the event that turned an idea into reality, the building is known as Habitat 67.

== Career ==
=== Habitat 67 and early career ===
In 1964, Safdie established Safdie Architects in Montreal to undertake work on Habitat 67, an adaptation of his thesis at McGill University. Habitat 67 was selected by Canada as a central feature of Expo 67. The project launched the design and implementation of three-dimensional, prefabricated units for living. Safdie designed the complex as a neighborhood with open spaces, garden terraces, and many other amenities typically reserved for the single-family home and adapted to a high-density urban environment.

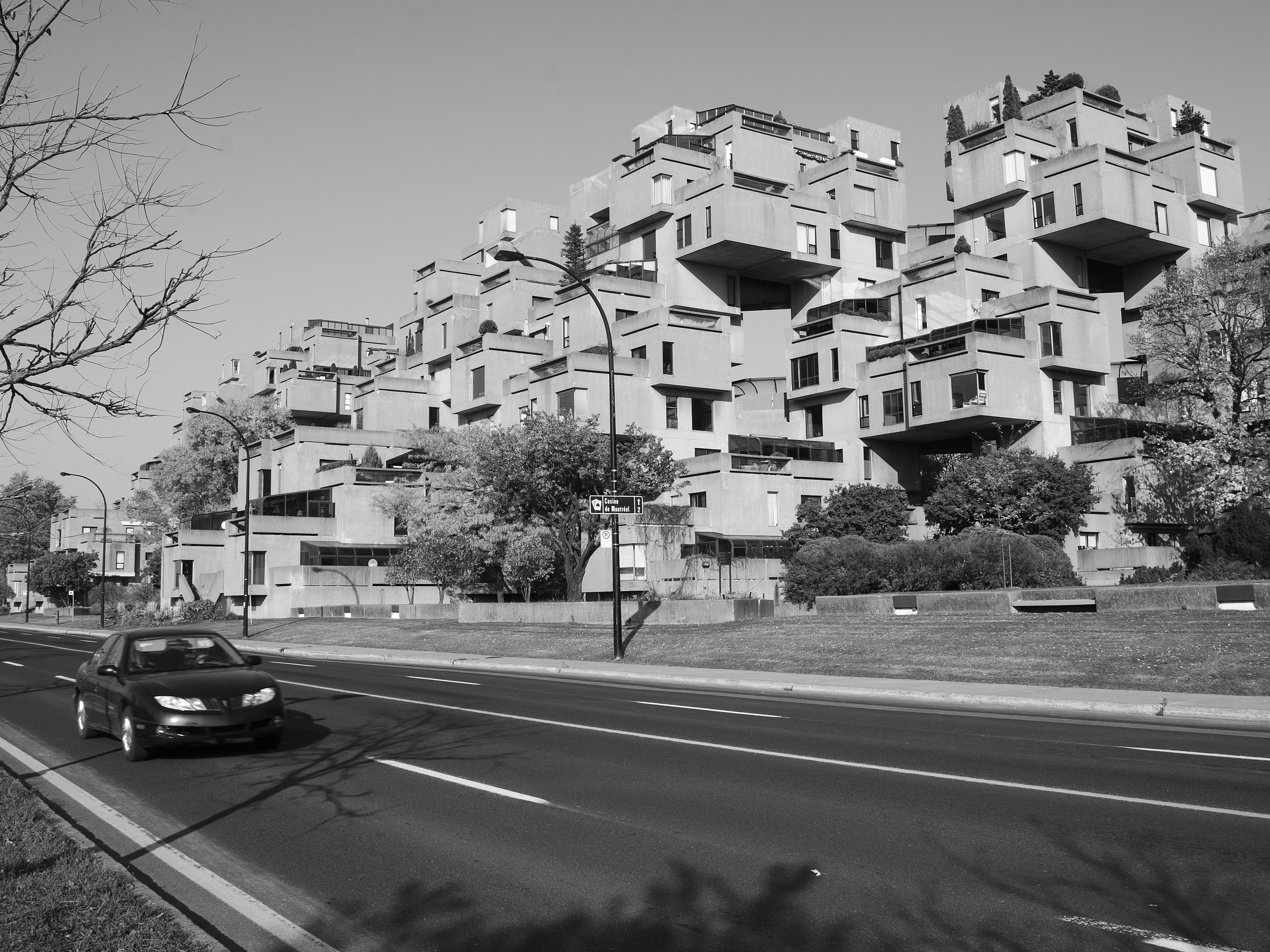
Habitat 67, in Montreal

=== Jerusalem and Israeli projects ===
In 1970, Safdie established a branch office of his practice in Jerusalem. During this period, Safdie combined his interests in social activism and advanced technologies with respect for historical and regional context. He worked on the restoration of the Old City and the construction of Mamilla Mall, linking old and new cities. Other significant works in Israel include the New City of Modi'in, the Yad Vashem Holocaust History Museum, Yitzhak Rabin Center for Israel Studies, Ben Gurion International Airport, National Campus for the Archeology of Israel, multiple projects for Hebrew Union College, and others. During this period, Safdie also worked with leaders in Senegal and Iran. Safdie was consulted on integrated geometry during the development of the Merkava tank by General Israel Tal.

=== Major international projects ===
Later, Safdie received commissions for public buildings in Canada, including the National Gallery of Canada, the Quebec Museum of Civilization, and Vancouver Library Square. Other notable cultural works include the Khalsa Heritage Memorial Complex, the national museum of the Sikh people in Punjab, India; the United States Institute of Peace Headquarters on the Mall in Washington, D.C.; the Kauffman Center for the Performing Arts in Kansas City, Missouri; and the Crystal Bridges Museum of American Art in Bentonville, Arkansas.

Safdie has worked on projects in emerging markets, bringing projects to completion in shorter periods and at larger scales. These include Marina Bay Sands, a mixed-use resort integrated with Singapore's Skypark; Jewel Changi Airport, an airport complex combining a marketplace and garden; and Raffles City Chongqing, a mixed-use development featuring more than one million square metres of housing, office, retail, transportation and hotel space. To connect four towers in Chongqing, China, he designed a sky bridge that has been referred to as the world's longest "Horizontal Skyscraper". Safdie and his team have used sky bridges and multi-level connectivity in other projects to make skyscrapers more accessible.

=== Safdie Architects ===
Safdie Architects is headquartered in Somerville, Massachusetts, near Harvard University, with additional offices in Jerusalem, Toronto, Shanghai and Singapore. The business is organized as a partnership.

Safdie formed a research program within his office to pursue the advanced investigation of design topics. The practice-oriented fellowship explores speculative ideas outside normal business practice constraints. Fellows work independently with Safdie and firm principals to formulate specific proposals and research plans. The salaried position is in-residence, with full access to project teams and outside consultants. Past fellowships include Habitat of the Future, Mobility on Demand, and Tall Buildings in the city.

In December 2023, Safdie Architects announced it was suspending its involvement in a controversial hotel development in Jerusalem's Armenian Quarter, citing "controversy surrounding the land lease agreement". This followed an attack by some 30 armed masked individuals on Armenian community members holding a vigil at the site. The Armenian Patriarchate in Jerusalem accused Danny Rothman, Safdie Architects' client for the project, of organizing the attack.

=== 24 Sussex Drive ===
In June 2026, Canadian Prime Minister Mark Carney appointed Safdie to chair the jury overseeing a design-and-build competition for the redevelopment of 24 Sussex Drive, the official residence of the prime minister of Canada. Carney personally approached Safdie about taking the role. Safdie is not designing the project himself; the jury will select a team of architects, developers and builders to undertake it.

Safdie said in September that significant changes to 24 Sussex were inevitable and that the project should not be approached simply as the restoration of a historic building. He said the redeveloped property would need to accommodate the prime minister and their family as well as ceremonial and social functions, and that at minimum a separate building would be needed for social events. Safdie described the existing residence as not architecturally significant in itself, while emphasizing the historical importance it had acquired through its association with Canadian prime ministers. He said the project should produce a "timeless design" reflecting the site's location in Ottawa and its place in Canada's national identity.

== Personal life ==
In 1959, Safdie married Nina Nusynowicz, a Polish-Israeli Holocaust survivor. Safdie and Nusynowicz have two children, a daughter and a son. Both were born during the inception and erection of Habitat 67. Just before its opening, Safdie and his young family moved into the development. Safdie and Nusynowicz divorced in 1981. His daughter Taal is an architect in San Diego, a partner of the firm Safdie Rabines Architects; His son Oren is a playwright who has written several plays about architecture. Safdie's great-nephews are independent filmmakers, Josh and Benny.

In 1981, Safdie married Michal Ronnen, a Jerusalem-born photographer and daughter of artist Vera Ronnen. Safdie and Ronnen have two daughters, Carmelle and Yasmin. Carmelle is an artist, and Yasmin is a social worker.

== Recognition ==
- 2026: American Academy of Achievement, "Golden Plate Award".
- 2025: President's Design Award for the Surbana Jurong Campus
- 2020: Genius Award, Liberty Science Center
- 2020: Lynn S. Beedle Lifetime Achievement Award, Council on Tall Buildings and Urban Habitat (CTBUH)
- 2019: Honorary Doctorate, Technion – Israel Institute of Technology
- 2019: Wolf Prize in Architecture, International Wolf Foundation
- 2018: Lifetime Achievement Award, Design Futures Council
- 2018: Shortlisted for the European Cultural Centre Architecture Award
- 2017: Honorary Doctorate, Ben-Gurion University of the Negev
- 2015: Gold Medal, American Institute of Architects
- 2012: Medaille du Merite, Ordre des architectes du Québec
- 2005: Companion Order of Canada, Governor General-in-Council of Canada
- 2003: Lifetime Achievement Award, YIVO Institute for Jewish Research
- 2002: Honorary Fellow, Royal Incorporation of Architects in Scotland
- 2001: Honorary Doctorate, Hebrew College
- 1997: Jewish Cultural Achievement Award in the Visual Arts, National Foundation for Jewish Culture
- 1996: Honorary Doctorate in Engineering, Technical University of Nova Scotia
- 1996: Academy Member, American Academy of Arts and Sciences
- 1995: Gold Medal, Royal Architectural Institute of Canada
- 1995: College of Fellows, American Institute of Architects
- 1993: Richard Neutra Award for Professional Excellence, California State Polytechnic University, Pomona
- 1989: Honorary Doctorate in Fine Arts, University of Victoria
- 1988: Honorary Doctorate in Sciences, Laval University
- 1987: Mt. Scopus Award for Humanitarianism, Hebrew University of Jerusalem
- 1986: The Order of Canada, Governor General-in-Council of Canada
- 1982: Honorary Doctor of Law, McGill University
- 1982: Tau Sigma Delta Gold Medal for Distinction in Design, Tau Sigma Delta Grand Chapter
- 1961: Lieutenant Governor's gold medal for Exceptional Merit, Lieutenant Governor of Québec

== Exhibitions ==
- 2017: Habitat 67 vers l’avenir: The Shape of Things to Come, Université du Québec à Montréal
- 2010–2014: Global Citizen: The Architecture of Moshe Safdie, National Gallery of Canada, Ottawa, Ontario, Canada / Skirball Cultural Center, Los Angeles, California / Crystal Bridges Museum of American Art, Bentonville, Arkansas, U.S.
- 2012–2013: Moshe Safdie: The Path to Crystal Bridges, Crystal Bridges Museum of American Art, Bentonville, Arkansas, U.S.
- 2004: An Architect's Vision: Moshe Safdie’s Jepson Center for the Arts, Telfair Museum of Art, Savannah, Georgia, U.S.
- 2003–2004: Building a New Museum, Peabody Essex Museum, Salem, Massachusetts, U.S.
- 1998: Moshe Safdie, Museum Architecture 1971–1998, Tel Aviv University, Tel Aviv, Israel
- 1989: Moshe Safdie, Projects: 1979–1989, Harvard University Graduate School of Design, Cambridge, Massachusetts, U.S.
- 1985: The National Gallery of Canada, Harvard University Graduate School of Design, Cambridge, Massachusetts, U.S. / National Gallery of Canada, Ottawa, Ontario, Canada
- 1982: Context, Traveling exhibit sponsored by New York Institute for the Humanities
- 1973–1974: For Everyone A Garden, Baltimore Museum of Art, Baltimore, Maryland, U.S. / National Gallery of Canada, Ottawa, Ontario, Canada / San Francisco MoMA, San Francisco, California, U.S.

== Films ==
- 2020: "Moshe Safdie: Another Dimension of Architecture", I-Talk Productions
- 2018: "Time Space Existence", Plane-Site
- 2004: "Moshe Safdie: The Power of Architecture", Dir. Donald Winkler
- 2003: "My Architect: A Son’s Journey", Dir. Nathaniel Kahn
- 1997: "The Sound of the Carceri with Yo-Yo Ma", Dir. Francois Girard
- 1973: "The Innocent Door" / "Coldspring New Town", National Film Board of Canada

== Archives ==
The Moshe Safdie Archive, donated to McGill University by the architect in 1990, is one of the most extensive individual collections of architectural documentation in Canada. Comprising material from 235 projects, the Moshe Safdie Archive records the progression of Safdie's career from his first unpublished university papers to Safdie Architects' current projects. The collection includes over 140,000 drawings, over 200 architectural models, extensive project files, audiovisual and digital material, as well as over 100,000 project photos and travel slides, 215 personal sketchbooks, and 2,250 large sketches. Administered by the McGill University Library, a list of physical holdings are available to researchers.

== Select projects ==
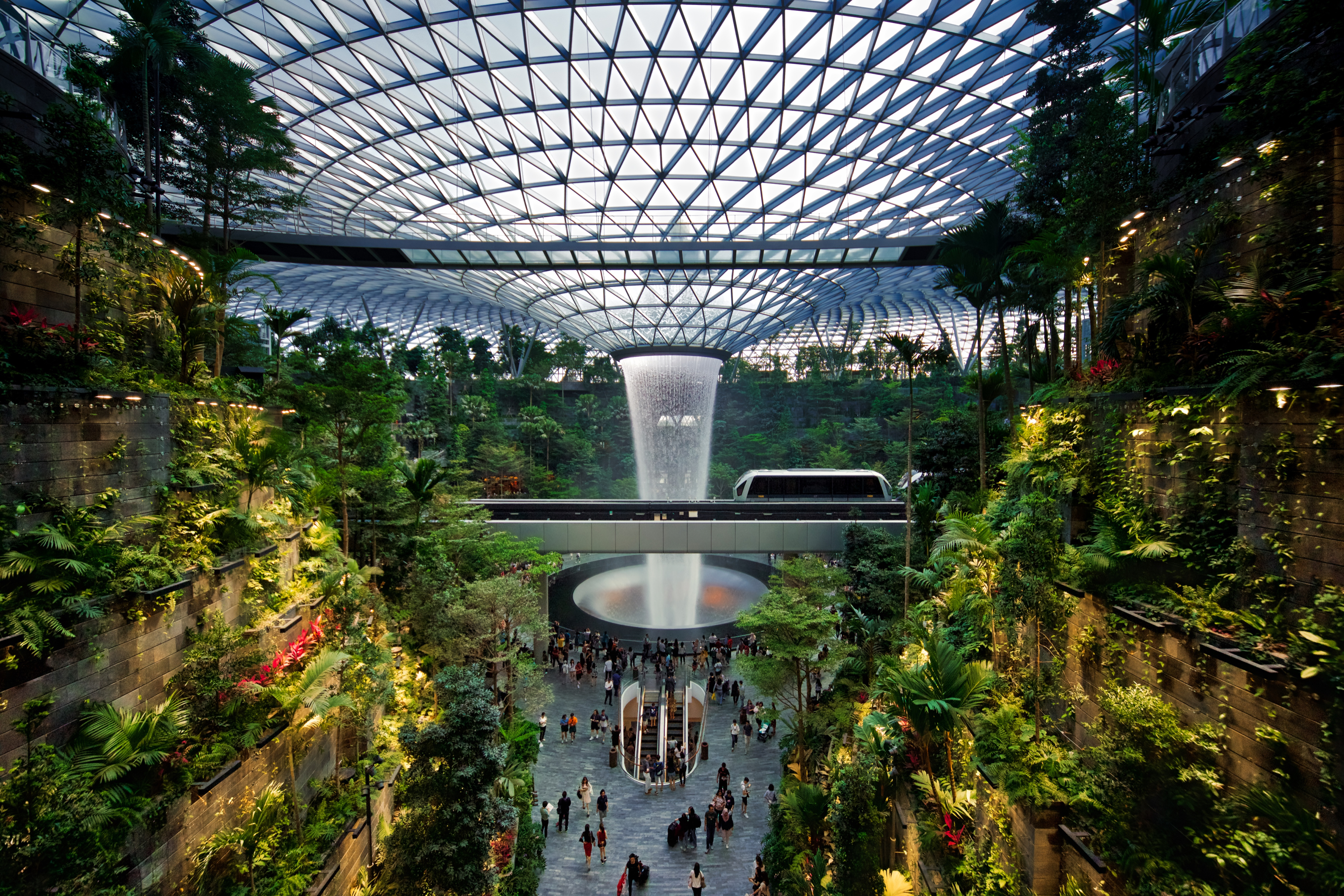
Jewel Changi Airport, Singapore, 2019

- 1967: Habitat 67 at Expo 67 World's Fair, Montreal, Quebec, Canada
- 1987: Musée de la Civilisation, Quebec City, Quebec, Canada
- 1988: National Gallery of Canada, Ottawa, Ontario, Canada
- 1989: New City of Modi'in, Israel
- 1989: Esplanade Condominiums, Cambridge, Massachusetts, U.S.
- 1991: Montreal Museum of Fine Arts, Montreal, Quebec, Canada
- 1992: The Class of 1959 Chapel, Harvard Business School, Boston, Massachusetts, U.S.
- 1994: John G. Diefenbaker Building, Ottawa, Ontario, Canada
- 1994: Rosovsky Hall, Harvard University, Cambridge, Massachusetts, U.S.
- 1995: Yad Vashem Children's and Deportees Memorials, Jerusalem
- 1995: Vancouver Library Square, Vancouver, British Columbia, Canada
- 1998: David Citadel Hotel and David's Village, Jerusalem
- 1998: Hebrew Union College, Jerusalem
- 1999: Yitzhak Rabin Center for Israel Studies and Rabin Tomb, Tel Aviv, Israel
- 2000: Exploration Place Science Museum, Wichita, Kansas, U.S.
- 2003: Peabody Essex Museum, Salem, Massachusetts, U.S. [12]
- 2003: Salt Lake City Public Library, Salt Lake City, Utah, U.S.
- 2003: Cairnhill Road Condominiums, Singapore
- 2003: Eleanor Roosevelt College, University of California, San Diego, California, U.S.
- 2004: Airside Building of Terminal 3, Ben Gurion International Airport, Tel Aviv, Israel
- 2004: Corrour Lodge, Rannoch Moor, Scotland, UK
- 2005: Yad Vashem Holocaust History Museum, Jerusalem
- 2006: Jepson Center for the Arts at Telfair Museum of Art, Savannah, Georgia, U.S.
- 2007: Terminal 1, Toronto Pearson International Airport, Toronto, Ontario, Canada
- 2008: United States Federal Courthouse, District of Massachusetts, Springfield, Massachusetts, U.S.
- 2008: Bureau of Alcohol, Tobacco, Firearms, and Explosives (ATF) Headquarters, Washington, D.C., U.S.
- 2009: Mamilla Center, Jerusalem
- 2009: Mamilla Hotel, Jerusalem
- 2010: Marina Bay Sands Integrated Resort, Singapore
- 2010: ArtScience Museum, Marina Bay Sands, Singapore
- 2011: United States Institute of Peace Headquarters, Washington, D.C., U.S.
- 2011: Kauffman Center for the Performing Arts, Kansas City, Missouri, U.S.
- 2011: Crystal Bridges Museum of American Art, Bentonville, Arkansas, U.S.
- 2011: Khalsa Heritage Memorial Complex (Virasat-e-Khalsa), Anandpur Sahib, Punjab, India
- 2013: Skirball Cultural Center, Los Angeles, California, U.S.
- 2012: Sky Habitat, Singapore
- 2017: Eling Residences, Chongqing, PRC
- 2017: Habitat Qinhuangdao, Qinhuangdao, PRC
- 2019: National Campus for the Archaeology of Israel, Jerusalem
- 2019: Monde Residential Development, Toronto, Ontario, Canada
- 2019: Jewel Changi Airport, Singapore
- 2020: Raffles City Chongqing, Chongqing, PRC
- 2021: Serena del Mar, Cartagena, Colombia
- 2021: Altair, Colombo, Sri Lanka
- 2022: Albert Einstein Education and Research Center, São Paulo, Brazil
- 2024: Surbana Jurong Campus, Singapore
- 2026: Crystal Bridges Museum of American Art Expansion, Bentonville, Arkansas, U.S.

== Works ==
- If Walls Could Speak: My Life in Architecture Ed. Ellis Woodman. New York, NY: Grove Press / Atlantic Monthly Press, 2022.
- With Intention to Build: The Unrealized Concepts, Ideas, and Dreams of Moshe Safdie. Ed. Michael Crosbie. Melbourne, Victoria: Images Publishing Group, 2020.
- "The Story of Israeli Architecture in Singapore" in Beating the Odds Together: 50 Years of Singapore-Israel Ties. Ed. Mattia Tomba. Singapore: World Scientific Book, 2019 . ISBN 978-981-121-468-4 OCLC 1122747159
- Megascale, Order & Complexity. Ed. Michael Jemtrud. Montreal: McGill University School of Architecture, 2009.
- The City After the Automobile: An Architect's Vision. With Wendy Kohn. New York: Basic Books; Toronto: Stoddart Publishing Co., 1997.
- The Language and Medium of Architecture (lecture at Harvard University Graduate School of Design delivered November 15, 1989)
- Jerusalem: The Future of the Past. Boston: Houghton Mifflin, 1989.
- Beyond Habitat by 20 Years. Ed. John Kettle. Montreal and Plattsburgh, NY: Tundra Books, 1987.
- The Harvard Jerusalem Studio: Urban Designs for the Holy City]. Asst. eds. Rudy Barton and Uri Shetrit. Cambridge, MA: The MIT Press, 1985.
- Form & Purpose. Ed. John Kettle. Boston: Houghton Mifflin, 1982.
- Habitat Bill of Rights With Nader Ardalan, George Candilis, Balkrishna V. Doshi, and Josep Lluís Sert. Imperial Government of Iran Ministry of Housing, 1976.
- For Everyone A Garden. Ed. Judith Wolin. Cambridge, MA: The MIT Press, 1974.
- Beyond Habitat. Ed. John Kettle. Cambridge, MA: The MIT Press, 1970.
- Habitat. Montreal: Tundra Books, 1967.

== Works about Safdie ==
- Jewel Changi Airport. Melbourne, Victoria: Images Publishing Group, 2020.
- Safdie. Mulgrave, Victoria: Images Publishing Group, 2014.
- Reaching for the Sky: The Marina Bay Sands Singapore. Singapore: ORO Editions, 2013.
- Peace Building: The Mission, Work, and Architecture of the United States Institute of Peace. Dalton, MA: The Studley Press, 2011.
- Valentin, Nilda, ed. Moshe Safdie. Rome: Edizione Kappa, 2010.
- Moshe Safdie I. Mulgrave, Victoria: Images Publishing Group, 2009.
- Moshe Safdie II. Mulgrave, Victoria: Images Publishing Group, 2009.
- Global Citizen: The Architecture of Moshe Safdie. New York:Scala Publishers, Ltd., 2007.
- Yad Vashem: Moshe Safdie – The Architecture of Memory. Baden, Switzerland: Lars Müller Publishers, 2006.
- Moshe Safdie, Museum Architecture 1971–1988. Tel Aviv: Genia Schreiber University Art Gallery, Tel Aviv University, 1998.
- Kohn, Wendy, ed. Moshe Safdie. London: Academy Editions, 1996.
- Moshe Safdie: Buildings and Projects, 1967–1992. Montreal: McGill-Queens University Press, 1996.
- Rybczynski, Witold. A Place for Art: The Architecture of the National Gallery of Canada. Ottawa: National Gallery of Canada, 1993.
- Montreal Museum of Fine Arts: Jean-Noël Desmarais Pavilion. Montreal: Montreal Museum of Arts, 1991.

== Gallery ==
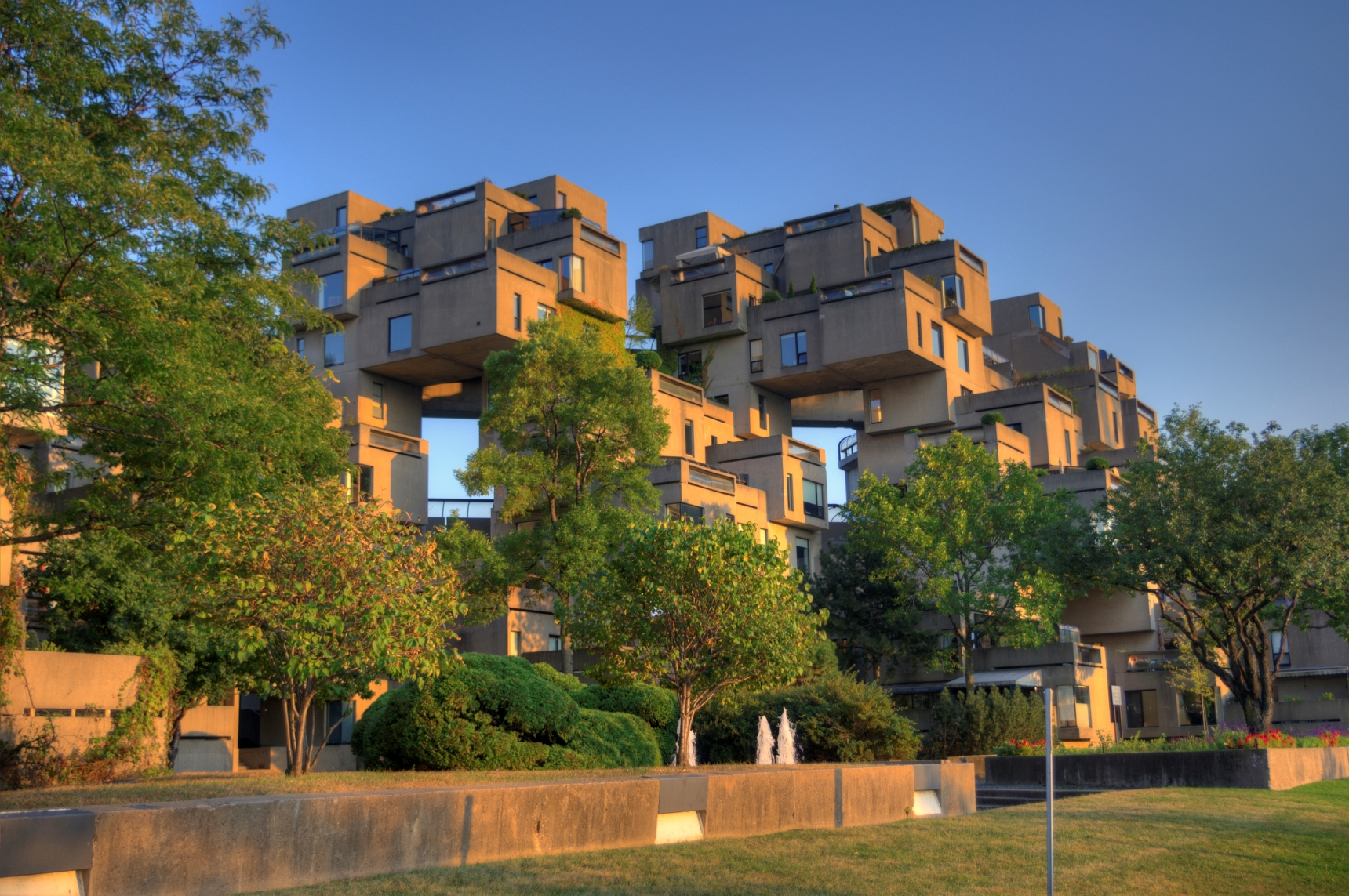
Habitat 67 (view showing blue sky through voids in the structure)

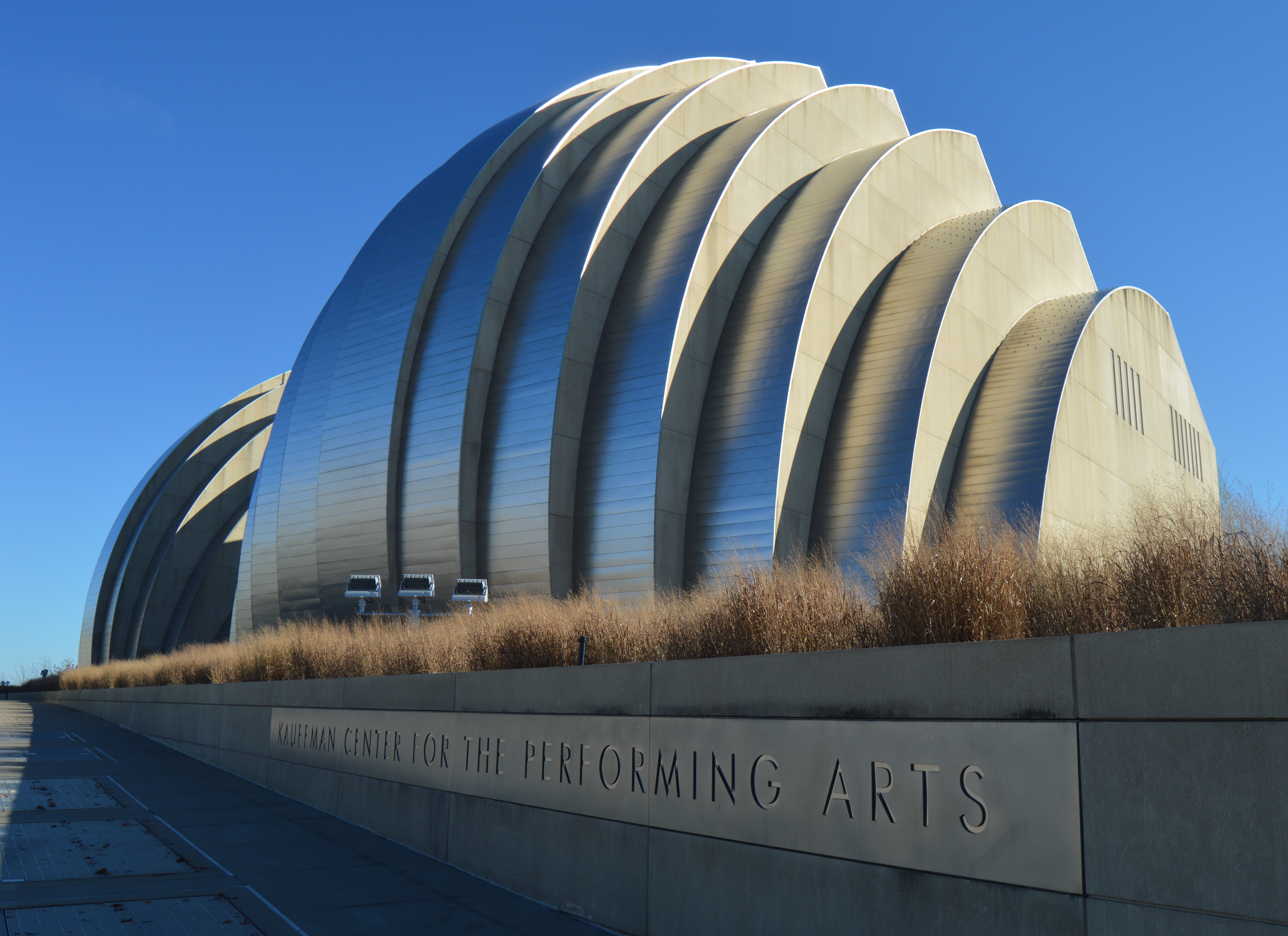
Kauffman Center for the Performing Arts, Kansas City, Missouri

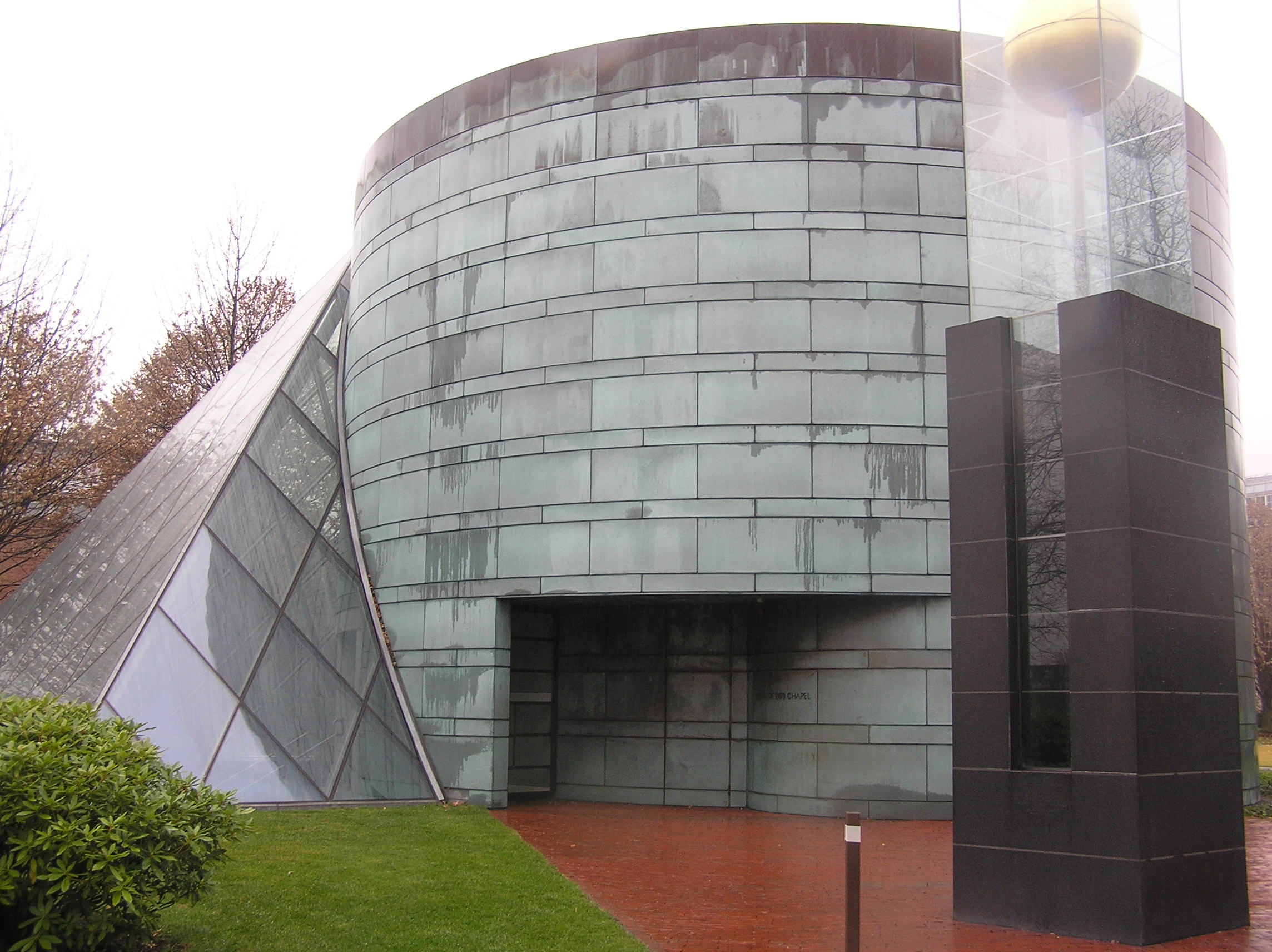
The Class of 1959 Chapel, Boston, Massachusetts

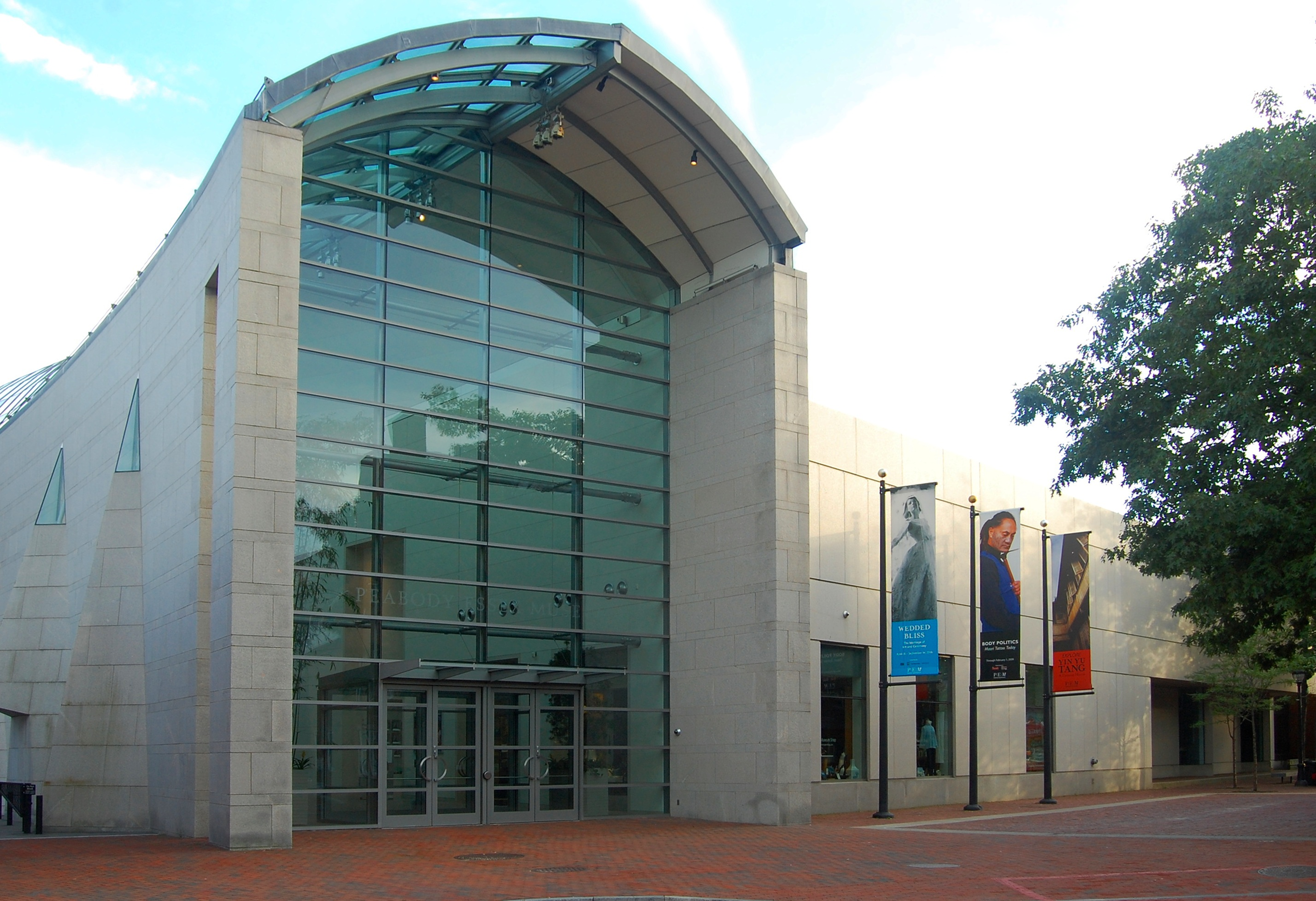
Peabody Essex Museum, Salem, Massachusetts

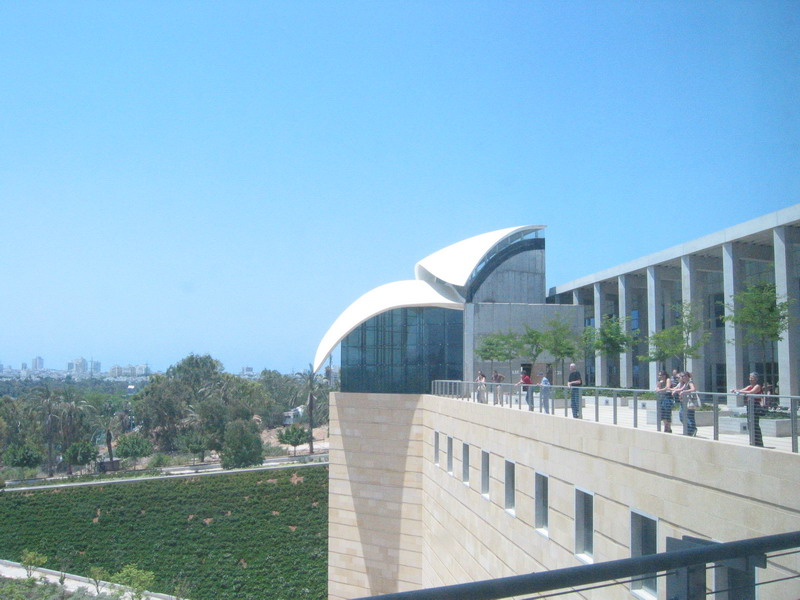
Yitzhak Rabin Center, Tel Aviv

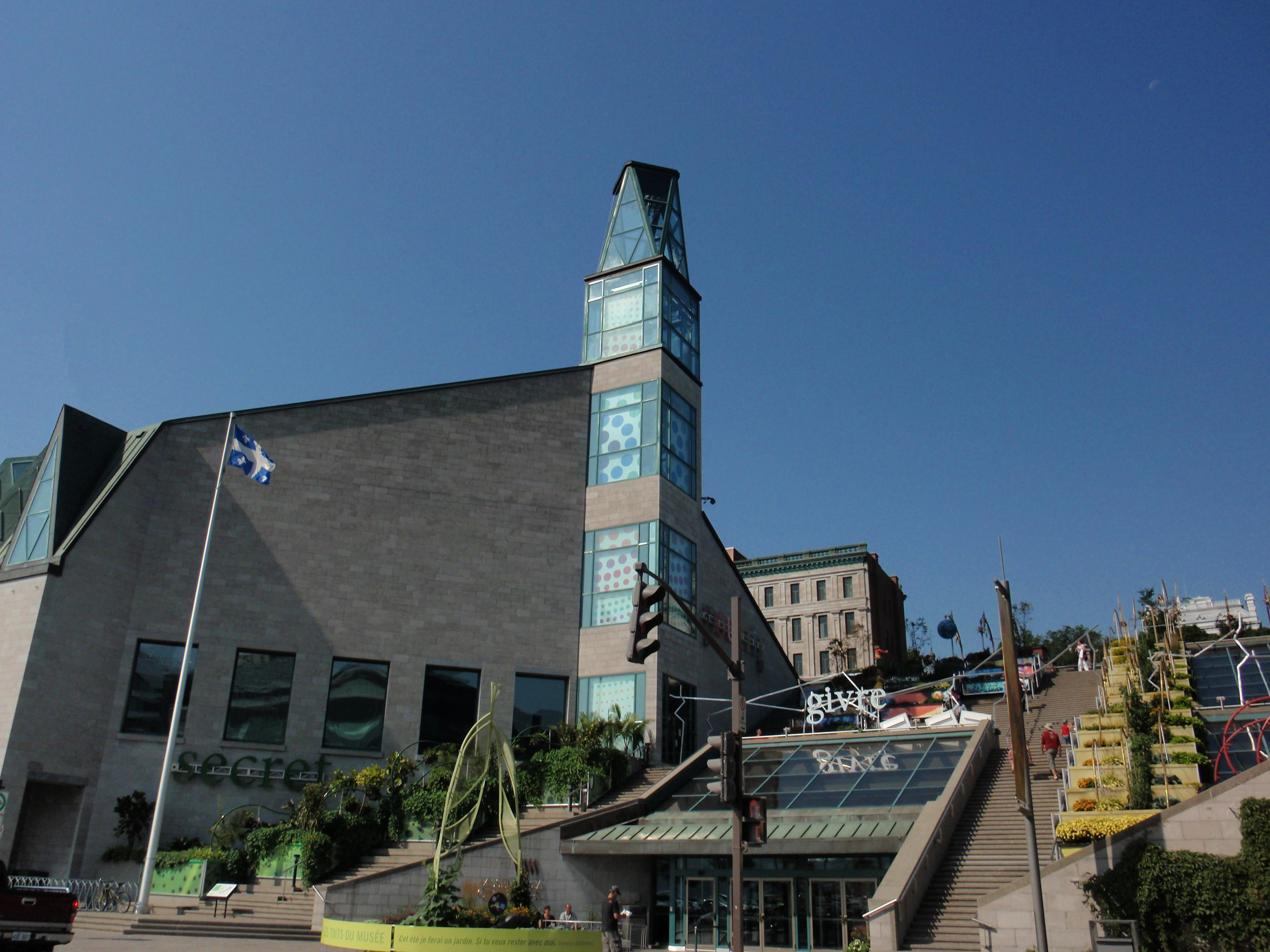
Musée de la Civilisation, Quebec City

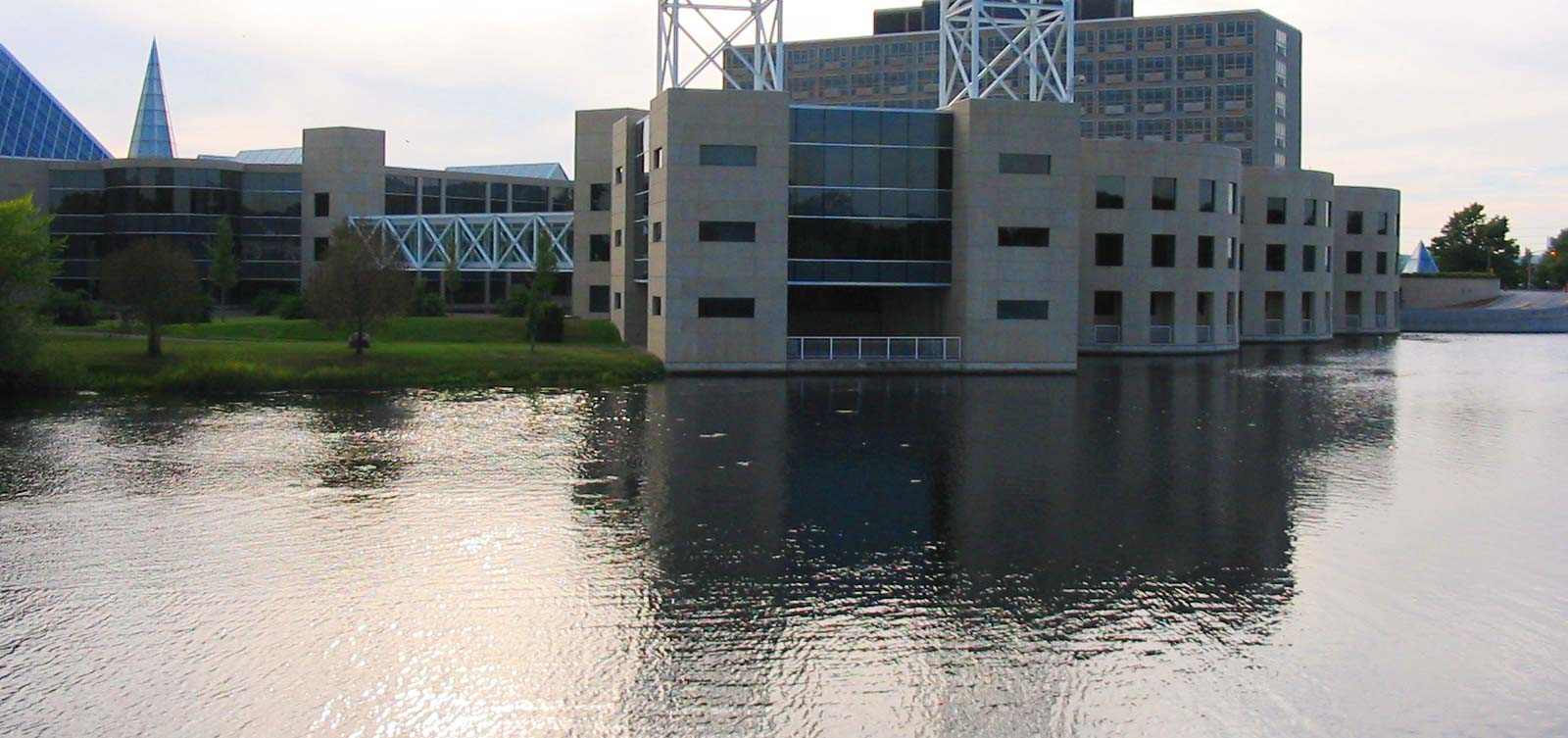
Ottawa City Hall, Ottawa

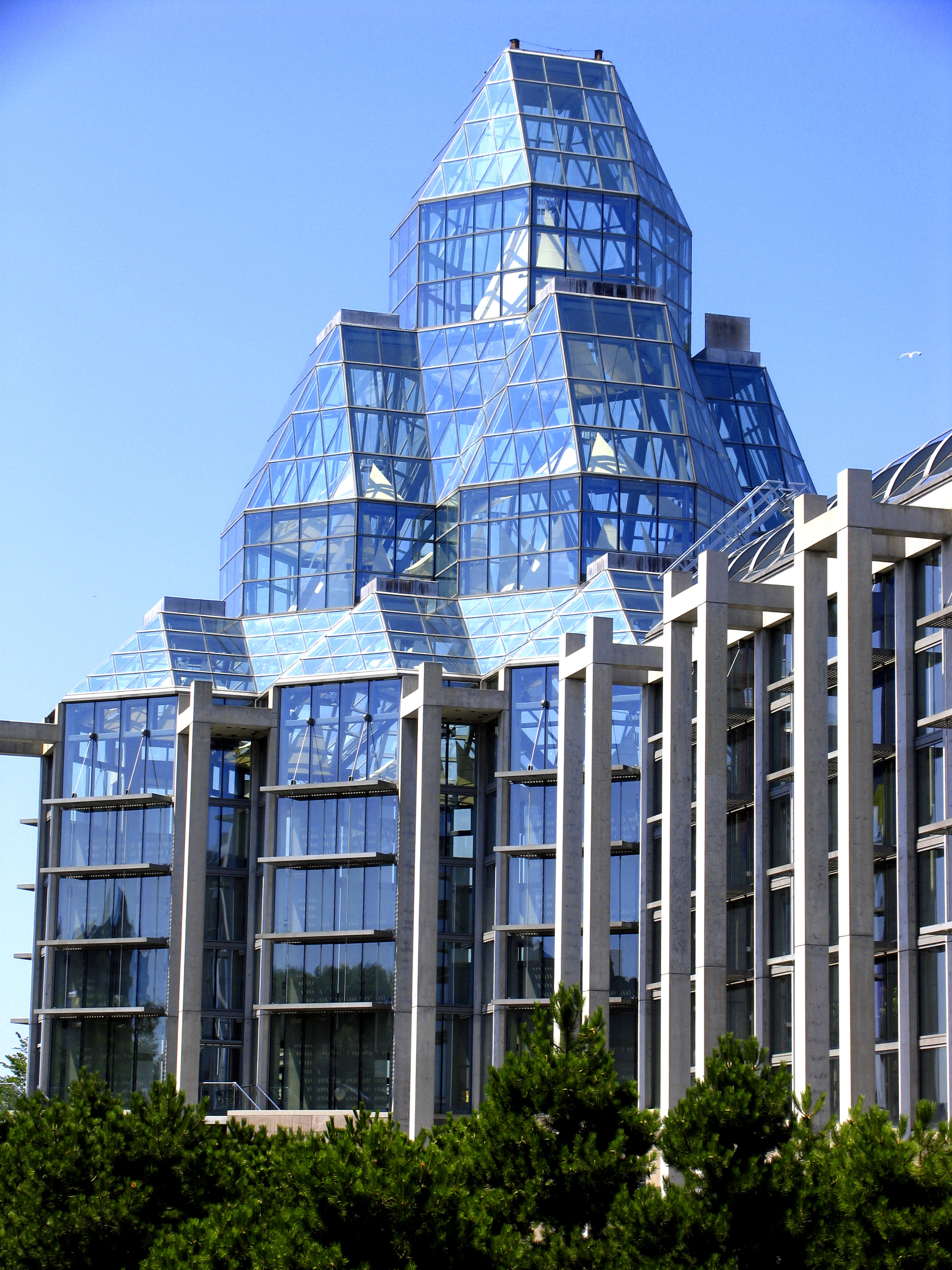
National Gallery of Canada, Ottawa

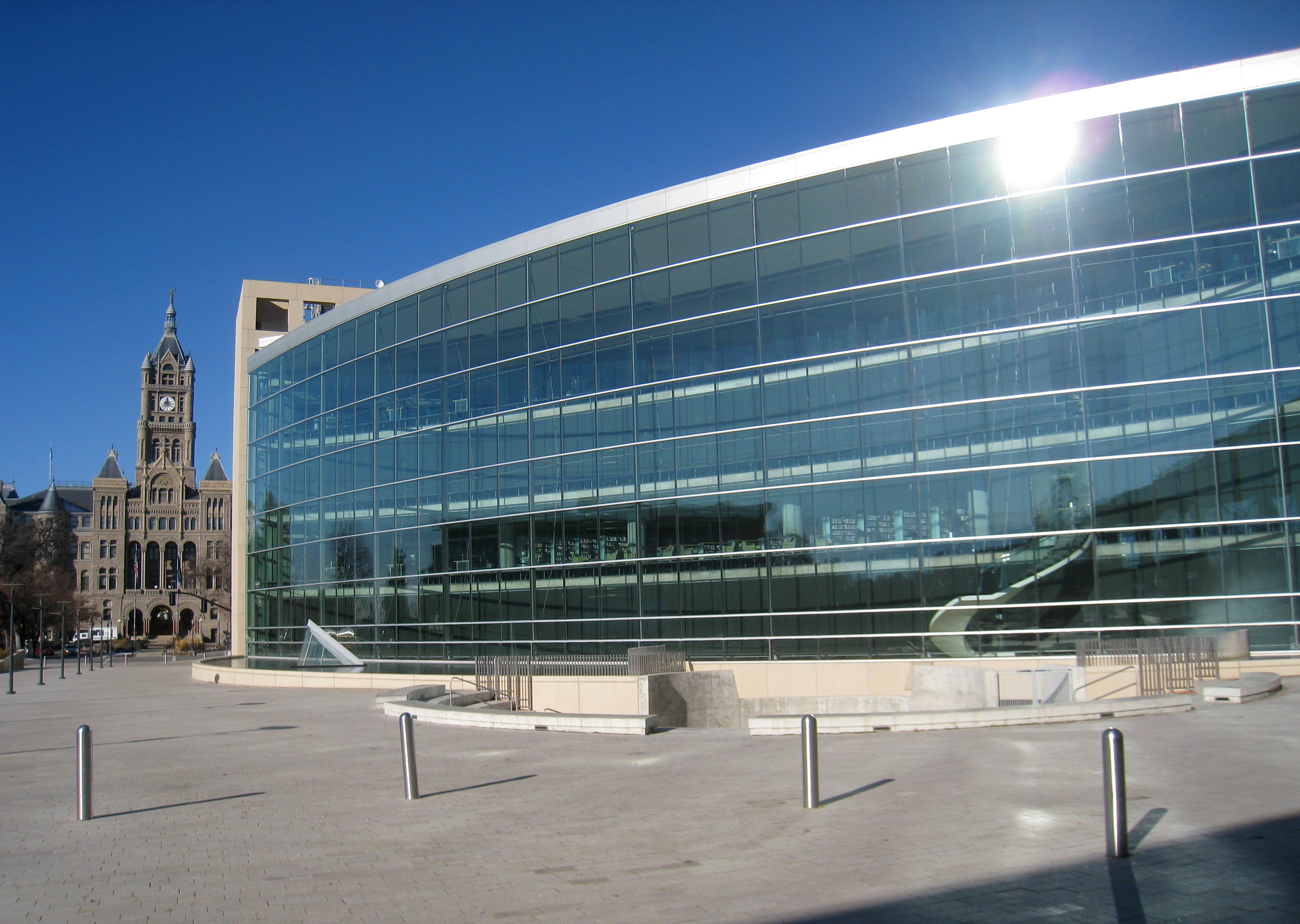
Salt Lake City Public Library, Utah

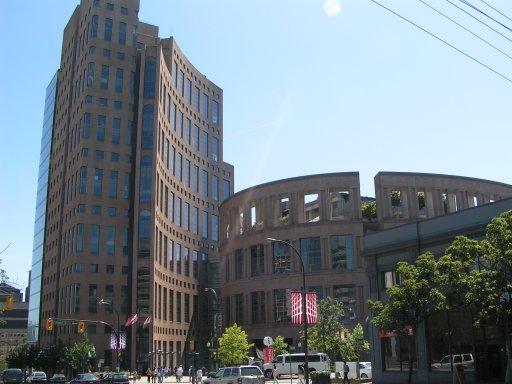
Vancouver Library Square, Vancouver, British Columbia

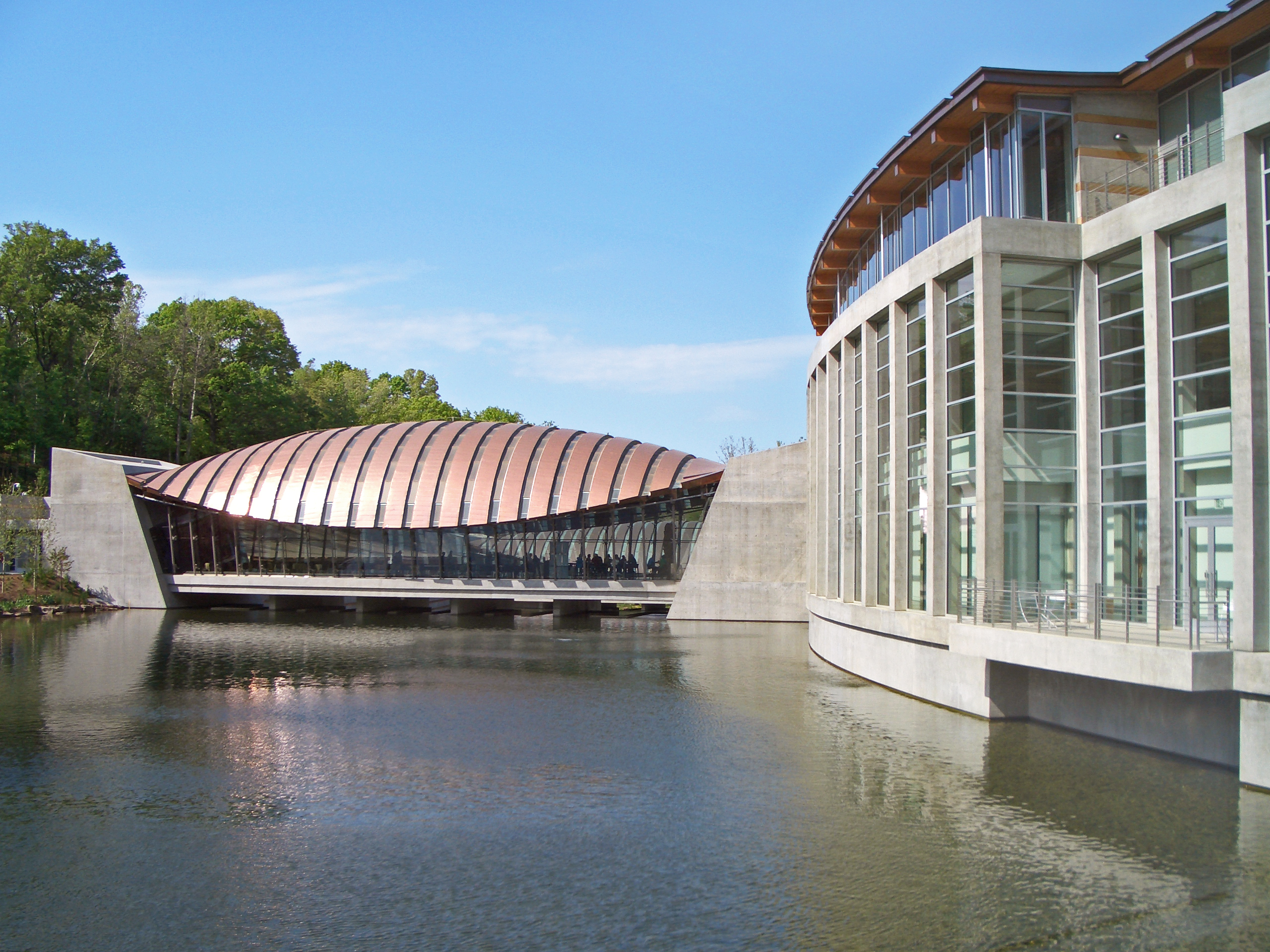
Crystal Bridges Museum of American Art, Bentonville, Arkansas

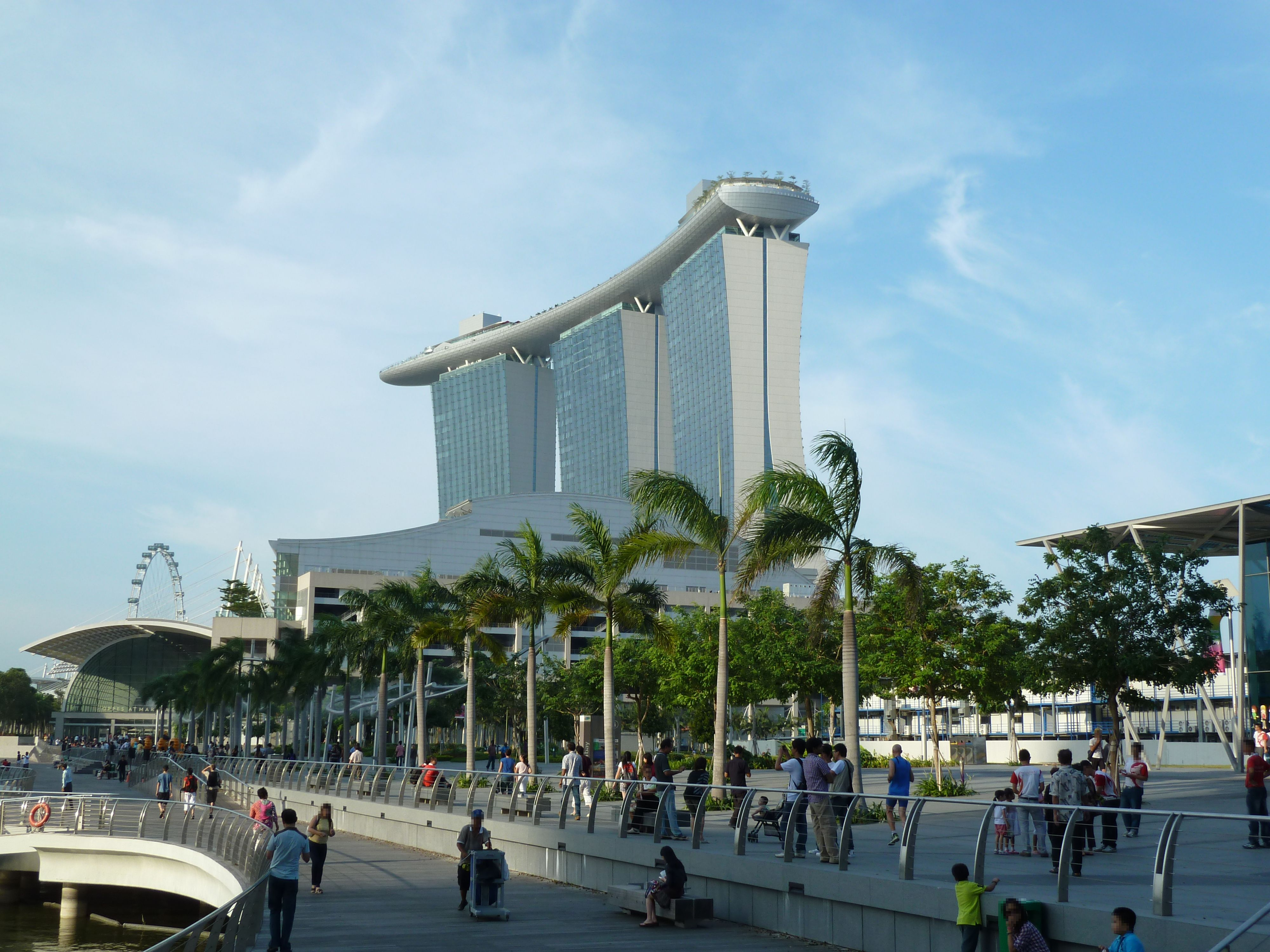
Marina Bay Sands, Singapore

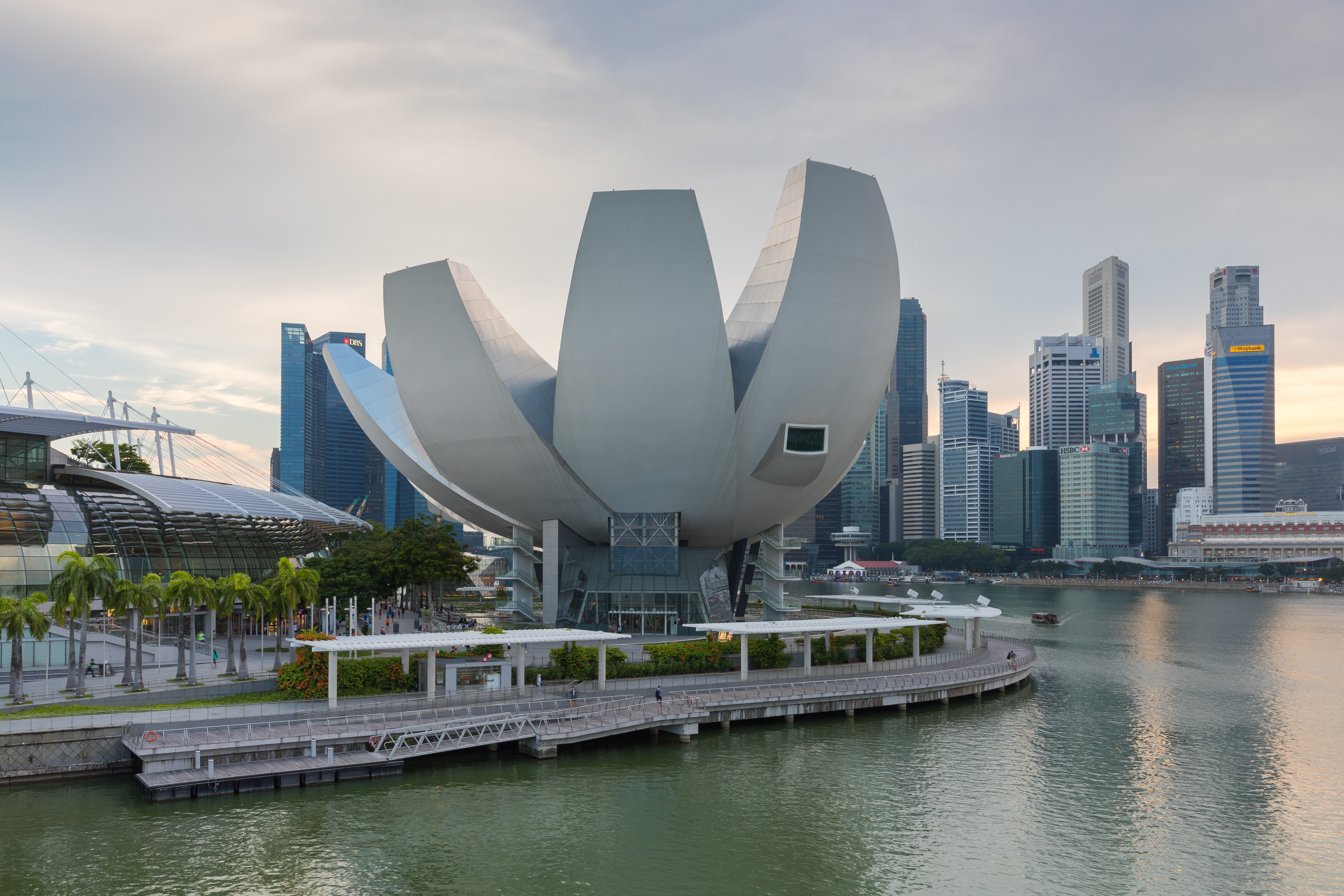
ArtScience Museum, Marina Bay Sands, Singapore

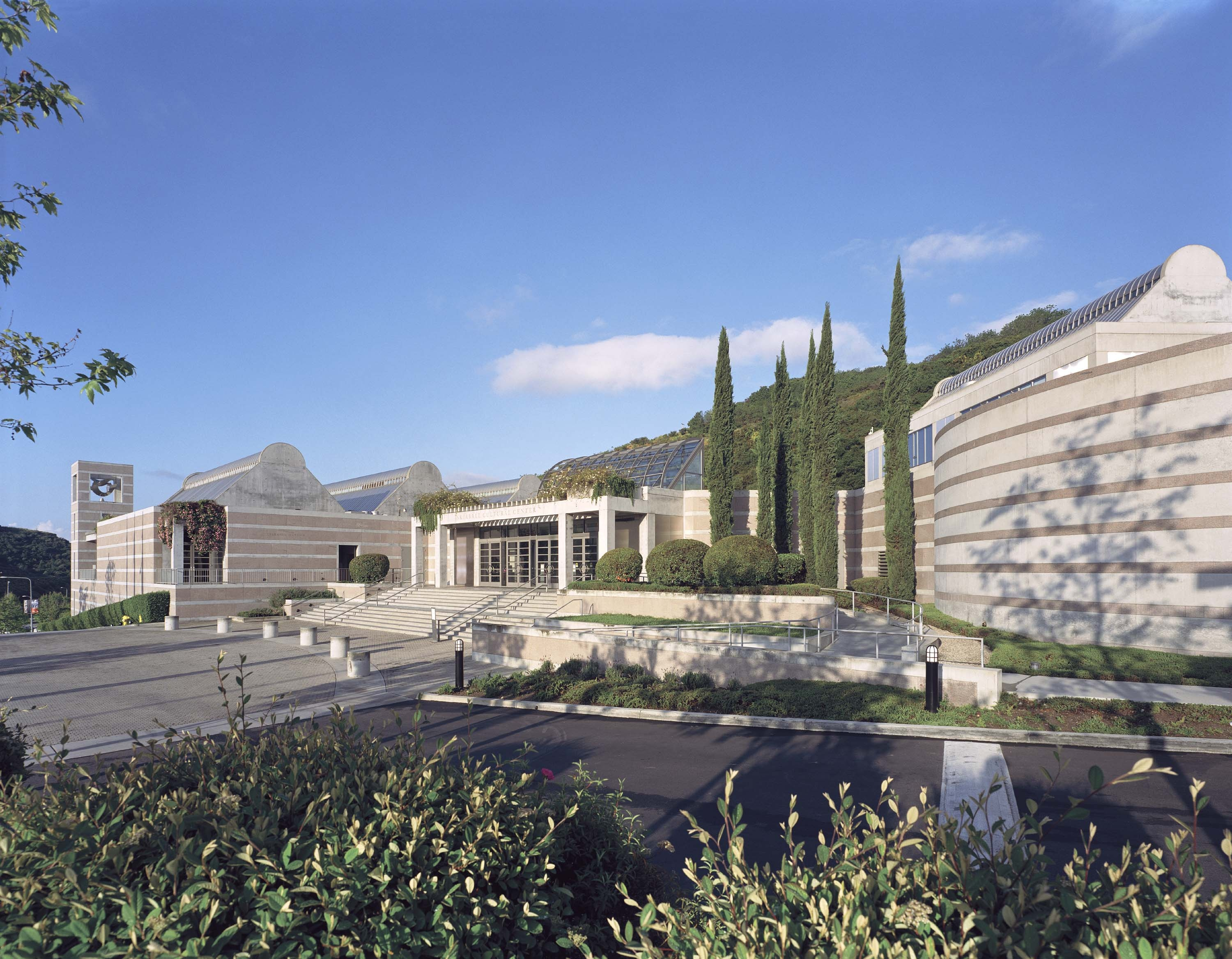
Skirball Cultural Center, Los Angeles, California

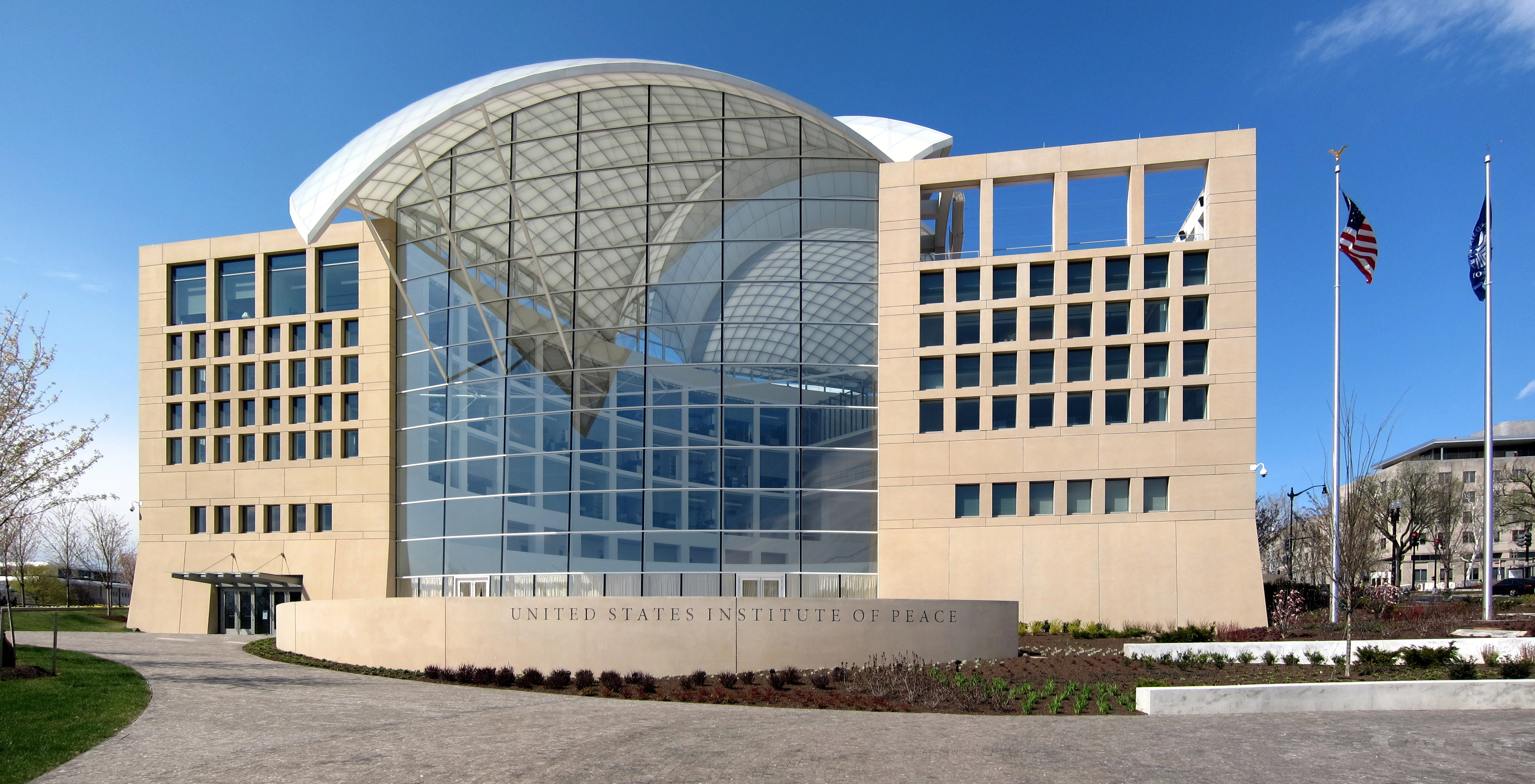
United States Institute of Peace Headquarters, Washington, D.C.

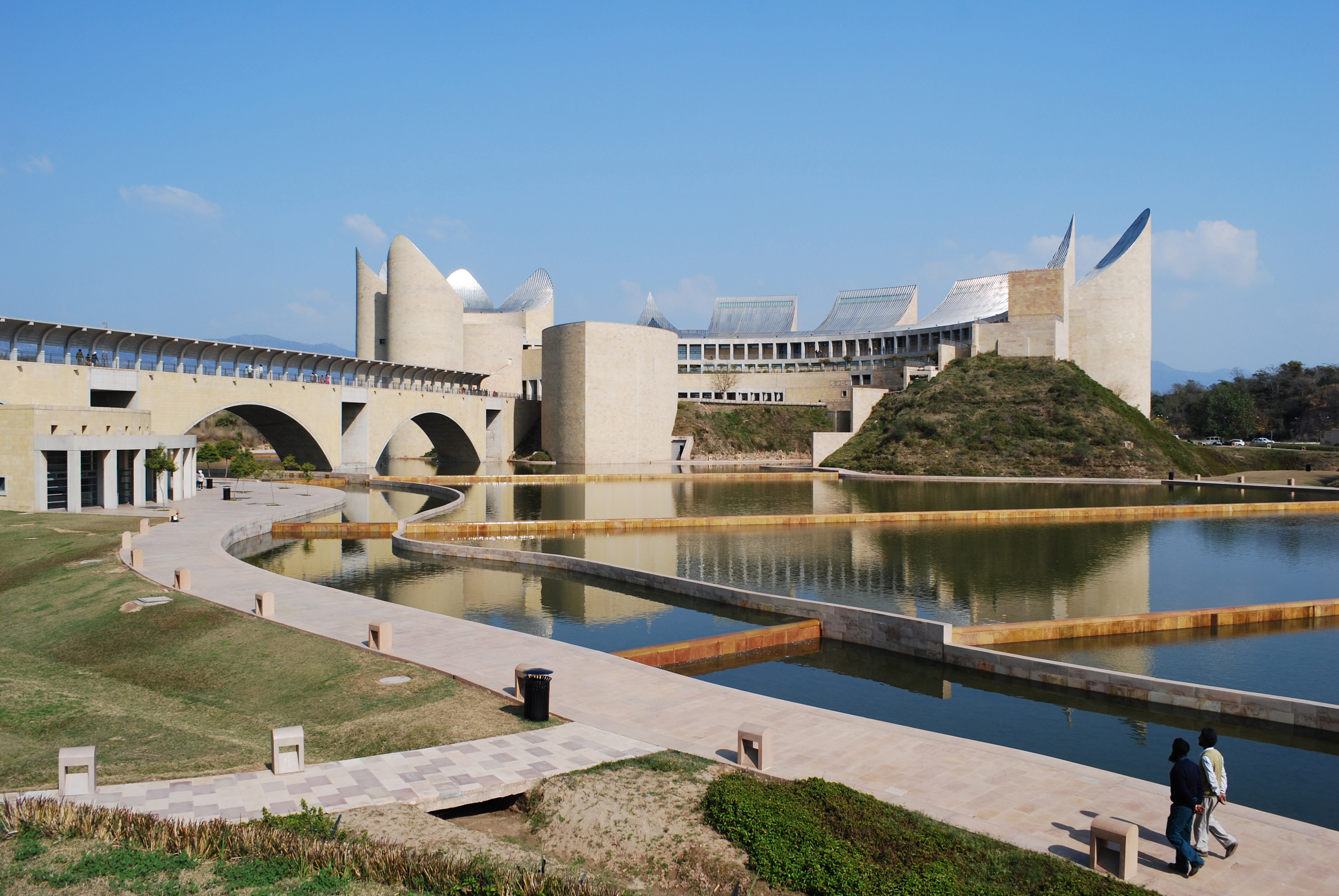
Khalsa Heritage Memorial Complex, Anandpur Sahib, India

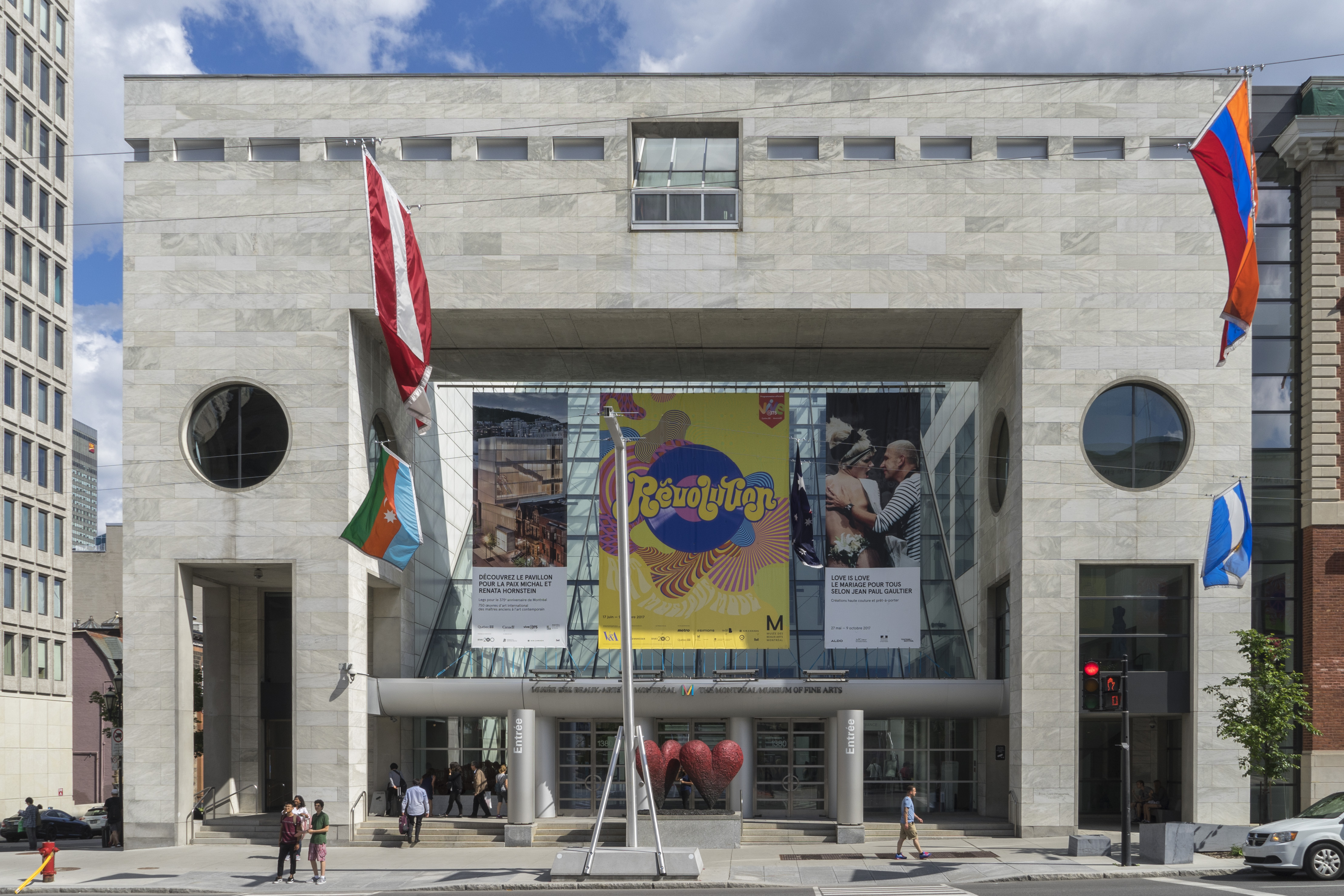
Montreal Museum of Fine Arts, Montreal
