= Sylvia Safdie =

Canadian artist

- Born: 1942 (age 83–84); Aley, Lebanon
- Education: Bachelor of Fine Arts Degree, Concordia University, 1975
- Known for: multimedia artist
- Partner: John Heward (d. 2018)
- Website: https://www.sylviasafdie.com/

Sylvia Safdie (born 1942) is a Canadian artist who gathers and utilizes found natural materials in a variety of mediums such as painting, sculpture, drawing, installation, photography and video to explore different themes in her work, calling upon early childhood memories, her Jewish heritage, and her experience of moving from Israel to Canada. She works and lives in Montreal, Québec.

== Early life and education ==
Sylvia Safdie was born in Aley, Lebanon, on August 17, 1942, to her parents Leon and Rachel Safdie. She was born into Syrian Jewish family, the youngest of three siblings. Her eldest brother, Moshe Safdie (born 1938) is an architect, and her other brother, Gabriel Safdie (born 1940) is a poet and literature teacher. She spent her early childhood years in Mount Carmel, Israel, but at age eleven, her family moved from Haifa, Israel to Montréal, Québec in 1953. She married, had two children, worked as a dental assistant and travelled. At the age of 26 while recovering from an operation she turned to painting. Safdie obtained her Bachelor of Fine Arts Degree at Concordia University, in Montreal, Québec, in 1975. Safdie resides and works in her home in Montreal, Québec, which was shared with John Heward, who was an active artist and her life partner until his death in 2018.

== Artistic career ==
Safdie's early childhood memories, her Middle Eastern Jewish heritage, and experiences in Israel, followed by moving to a new country, are main sources of inspiration and inform her five-decade-long artistic career. As a child, she would build sandcastles on the beaches near Haifa, where she became aware of their vulnerability amongst the waves with time, and further increased her fascination with transiency. At this time, she began to collect rocks and natural ephemera, which she then classified by size, shape, colour, material, and origin. These childhood practices and impulses were carried into her career as a professional artist and helped navigate her feelings of displacement after leaving Israel.

After completing her degree, Safdie has travelled broadly to places rich in her Israeli roots, such as Haifa, Jaffa, and Jerusalem, and to areas such as Morocco, Mexico, and India. During her travels, she physically collects or video documents specific natural objects, materials, or scenes, and ultimately capture the subtle archeological traces of place through time. Over the course of her explorations, Safdie collected over 500 earth samples, which she uses in her paintings and drawings. Her travels are viewed as an ongoing exploration of spirituality and her Jewish history, combined with her passion for nature, as a form of grounding herself with the land and past.

Chronologically, Safdie used found natural objects in her sculpture installations at the beginning of her career in the 1970s, and then, in the early 1980s, she began painting with oil and earth materials. Scratching away and layering are among many physical techniques that characterize her process of painting. Later in her career, she was drawn to photography to capture inherent truths revolving around her themes. In 2001, Safdie began experimenting with video works that included or excluded sound, which demonstrated her ideas in a fluid, non-static way.

== Themes, style, and techniques ==
Sylvia Safdie's visual language speaks about the intersection of time, place, and memory, with deeper themes of transformation and temporality. Her representation of the connection between the human figure, especially the female form, and the natural world is borderline abstract, yet consists of figurative representation. Safdie utilizes sand, earth, stone, wood, and other natural materials, either untouched or used as a medium. Her process demonstrates her subject in a state of transformation that is emerging, disappearing, or “presently absent”. Her depiction of lost or displaced humans puts emphasis not on emptiness, but on how their presence lives on through traces in the natural world.

Safdie's sculptures are developed in multiple series and often titled simple Hebrew words such as Zakhor (memory), Keren (light ray), and Lahav (eternal flame). Many of her pieces take several years to culminate into a final work, collection, or series.

"I was interested in how we are formed by nature and how the body is part of it," she explains.

== Selected Works/Series ==
- Earth Marks Series (1997-). This ongoing paint and drawing series of natural earth pigments mixed with oil on mylar. The abstracted subject resembles a human form that is reappearing or disappearing with a transient aura.
- Keren No.4 (1999). A copper barrel sculpture containing an open book with blank pages. As the viewer circles the barrel, an illusion of the pages in the book begin to turn, inflamed by light.
- Gulls (2002). An early video work depicting a gull hovering in flight played continuously on loop, which skew and pause the viewer's perception. The video is unaccompanied by sound and the video speed is slowed.
- Gladys: A Life (2005). A slowed-down video work documenting Gladys Barnes, a 95-year-old native of Trout River Newfoundland, in a state of sleep/awakening. It depicts Glady's slowed facial movements such as an evolving smile or closing of eyes.
- The Absent Present (2010). The work features three related video works: Pond/Auschwitz (2011), Reflection/Auschwitz (2011) and Web/Auschwitz (2011), and Lehav (1993), which is a sculpture. The video works were Safdie's documentation of Auschwitz, during her travels. It depicts rain falling on flooded areas of the camp, utilizing the water as a metaphor for personal reflection.
- As I Walk, (2021). A meticulously curated installation of found earth materials gathered by the artist over an extensive time period. Some objects vaguely suggest human extremities such as feet and faces, all of which have traces and scars of movement and time.

== Exhibitions ==
Her solo shows include: Galerie de l'Esprit, Mtl. (1975); Musée d'Art Vivant Véhicule, Md. (1980); Galerie/Gallery Don Stewart, Montreal, Toronto (1981, 1982, and 1983); Evelyn Aimis Gallery (1984, 1986, 1988, 1990, 1992); Galerie J. Yahouda Meir, Mtl. (1987, 1994, 2015); Art Gallery of Hamilton (1987); Centre Saidye Bronfman, Md. (1987); Galerie Montcalm, Hull, Que. (1988); 460 Ste. Catherine St. W., Suite 728, Mtl. (1994); Justina M. Barnicke Gal., Tor. (1994); Diane Farris Gal., Van. (1996); Paul Petro Contemporary Art, Tor. (1998, 2000); Paul Kuhn Gallery, Calgary (2002–2003, 2007); MacKenzie Art Gallery, Regina (2011); and others. In 2021, she had an exhibition titled As I Walk at the Darling Foundry in Montreal called "a masterly installation" by the Canadian art magazine Vie des Arts and "haunting" by Art Forum. In 2025 and 2026, Sylvia Safdie: TERRA was held at the National Gallery of Canada.

He work has been included in numerous group shows since 1978. Among them were the First Biennale for Québec Artists, Galerie du Centre des arts Saidye Bronfman, Montréal (1978); Face à face, Powerhouse Gallery, Montréal (1984); Hidden Values, McMichael Canadian Art Collection, Kleinburg, Ontario (1994); 25 Artists, 25 years: Celebrating the Faculty of Fine Arts, Galerie d'art Leonard & Bina Ellen, Université Concordia, Montréal (2001); Second Guanlan International Print Biennial 2009, Guanlan Museum, Shenzhen, China; and These Waters Have Stories To Tell, Glynn Vivian Art Gallery, Swansea, Wales (2018).

== Collections ==
Her work is in the collection of the Musée national des beaux-arts du Québec, in the Montreal Museum of Fine Arts, and elsewhere in Canada, as well as in galleries in the United States, Brazil, Switzerland, and Denmark.

== Awards/Prizes ==
- First Biennale for Québec Artists, Galerie du Centre des arts Saidye Bronfman, Montréal (1977)
- Canada Council, Project Grant Gouvernement du Québec, Ministère des affaires culturelles, aide "Accessibilité" (1980/1987)
- Gouvernement du Québec, Ministère des affaires culturelles, bourse “A” Thomas More Institute, Montréal - first prize (1991/1993)
- Canada Council, "B" Grant (1993)
