= Anti-Jewish boycotts =

Economic, political, and cultural boycotts of Jewish people or businesses

Anti-Jewish boycotts are organized boycotts directed against Jewish people to exclude them economical, political or cultural life. Antisemitic boycotts are often regarded as a manifestation of popular antisemitism.

== 19th and early 20th century boycotts ==
In Hungary, promotion for boycotts began in 1875 with an antisemitic speech from Győző Istóczy in the Hungarian House of Representatives. From the 1880s there were calls in some of the Catholic press, such as the daily newspaper Magyar Állam, for Jews to be boycotted. The government passed laws limiting Jewish economic activity from 1938 onwards.

In Russia, after a series of anti-Jewish pogroms in the Russian Empire following the assassination of Tsar Alexander II, towards that end in 1880 they were forbidden from purchasing land or taking mortgages (see the May Laws). Quotas limited Jewish access to educational institutions and from 1892 they were banned from participation in local elections and could constitute no more than 10% of company shareholders.

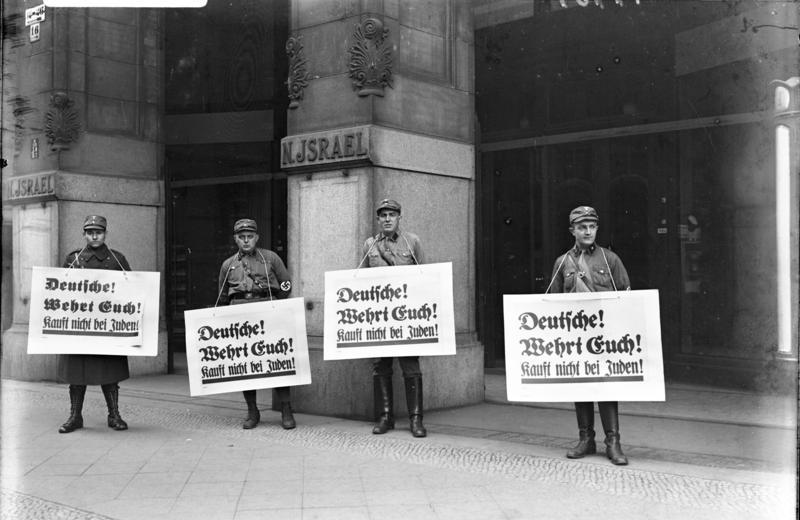
Nazi SA paramilitaries outside Israel's Department Store in Berlin, holding signs saying: "Germans! Defend yourselves! Don't buy from Jews"

In 19th century Austria, Karl Lueger, an antisemitic mayor of Vienna who inspired Hitler, campaigned for a boycott of Jewish businesses as a last resort for his party. Jews were only allowed to live in Vienna from 1840. An organization called the Antisemitenbund campaigned against Jewish civil rights since 1919. Austrian campaigns tended to heighten around Christmas and became effective from 1932.

In Ireland, Father John Creagh in Limerick campaigned against the town's small Jewish community in 1904, leading to a boycott of Jewish businesses and the departure of the Jewish population from the town.

In Ukraine, there was a boycott of Jews in Galicia, with allegations of Jewish support for Poland, while Poles in Galicia boycotted Jews for supporting Ukraine. In 1921, the German student union, the Deutschen Hochschulring, barred Jews from membership. Since the bar was racial, it included Jews who had converted to Christianity. The bar was challenged by the government leading to a referendum in which 76% of students voted for the exclusion.

In Quebec, French-Canadian nationalists organized boycotts of Jews in the thirties.

== Fascist boycotts ==
The Nazi boycott of Jewish businesses in Germany took place on 1 April 1933 as a response to the Jewish boycott of German goods which had started soon after Adolf Hitler was sworn in as Chancellor on 30 January 1933.

It was the first of many measures against the Jews of Germany, which ultimately culminated in the "Final Solution". It was a state-managed campaign of ever-increasing harassment, arrests, systematic pillaging, forced transfer of ownership to Nazi party activists (managed by the Chamber of Commerce), and ultimately murder of owners defined as "Jews". In Berlin alone, there were 50,000 Jewish owned businesses.

In Poland, the Endeks (founded by Roman Dmowski) organized boycotts of Jewish businesses across Poland. Polish universities placed growing limits on the number of Jews allowed to attend, (see numerus clausus) and increasingly forced them to sit separately from non-Jewish students, a practice known as "Ghetto benches" which became law in 1937. In 1936 Prime Minister Felicjan Sławoj Składkowski called for "economic struggle" and "economic boycott of the Jews became formal government policy from June 4, 1936". Kosher slaughter was banned in Poland in 1936, in Germany in 1930 following the similar legislation enacted in many other European countries.

In the US, Nazi supporters, such as Father Charles Coughlin (an Irish immigrant), encouraged a boycott of Jewish businesses. Coughlin's radio show attracted tens of millions of listeners and his supporters organized "Buy Christian" campaigns and attacked Jews.

== Anti-Zionist boycotts ==
In Palestine, the Arab leadership organized boycotts of Jewish businesses from 1929 onwards, with violence often directed at Arabs who did business with Jews. A series of riots in Egypt described by one British Embassy official as "clearly anti-Jewish" occurred in 1945, starting on the date of the Balfour Declaration. In the following weeks, the Egyptian press attacked Egyptian Jews as capitalists, white-slave traders, and other slurs while calling for a boycott of Jewish goods. Later in 1945, the Arab League began a boycott of Jewish businesses in British Mandatory Palestine.

In the 2000s, the BDS movement, which advocates for a total boycott of Israeli products, is regarded by some Jewish civil rights organizations (such as the Anti-Defamation League and the Simon Wiesenthal Center), as well as pro-Israel organizations and scholars as driven by antisemitism. This has been disputed by the BDS movement itself and Jewish supporters of BDS.

== See also ==
- 3D Test of Antisemitism
- Hebrew labor
- Arab general strike (Mandatory Palestine)
- Arab boycott
- Austerity in Israel
- Economic antisemitism
