= Hebrew labor =

Jewish ideal later embraced by Zionists

Jewish demonstrators near citrus groves in Kfar Saba, demanding the employment of Jewish workers

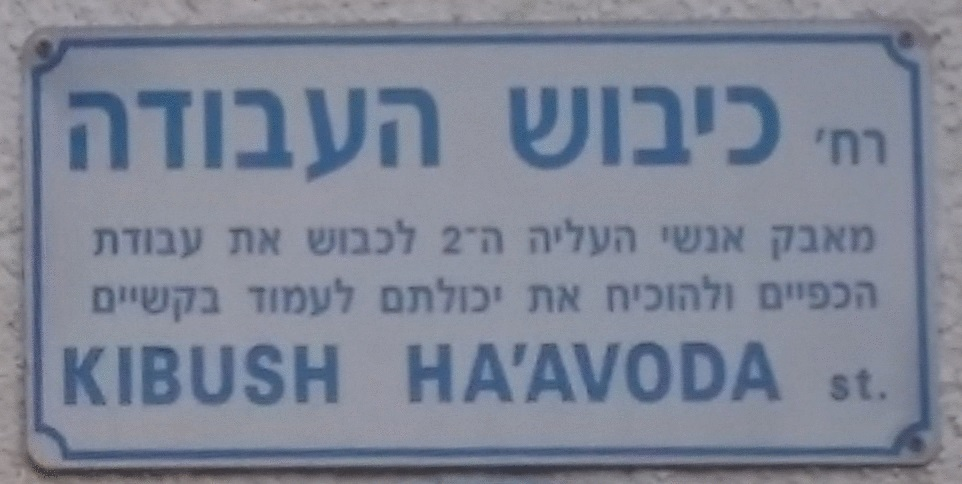
Kibush Ha'Avoda street, Herzliya

"Hebrew labor" (Hebrew: עבודה עברית, romanized: Avoda Ivrit) and "the conquest of labor" (כיבוש העבודה, Kibush haAvoda) are two related terms and concepts. The first refers to the ideal adopted by some Jews in Ottoman and Mandatory Palestine during the late 19th and early 20th centuries and later embraced by Zionism to favour hiring Jewish rather than non-Jewish workers. The second is the slogan for the Jews to embrace productive (industrial and agricultural) labor rather than being engaged only in trades and professions.

== Background ==
=== End of the Ottoman period ===
During the Second Aliyah period (1904-1914) many Jewish immigrants to Ottoman Palestine sought year-round jobs on the agricultural tracts and plantations of their fellow Jews who had arrived during the First Aliyah. Rather than hire their fellow Jews, the immigrants of the First Aliyah were initially inclined to hire local Arabs who provided cheaper labor. Eventually the immigrant laborers of the Second Aliyah unionized and successfully persuaded the First Aliyah immigrants to hire them and thereby displace the Arab labor. They organized under the banner of "Hebrew Labor" and "conquest of labor".

The struggle for Jewish labor, for Jews to employ only Jews, was constantly pushed by the leaders of the Second Aliyah, who founded Labor Zionism and in the 1930s became the leaders of the Zionist movement. Shortly after his arrival in Palestine in 1906 David Ben-Gurion noted that a moshava, a private Jewish agricultural settlement, employed Arabs as guards. He asked himself: "Was it conceivable that here too we should be deep in Galuth, (Note: By invoking the term בגלות, 'in Galuth', Ben-Gurion metaphorically compared Arab guards with the occupying Babylonians in the history of the Jews, see Jewish diaspora § Origins and uses of the terms) hiring strangers to guard our property and protect our lives?". Soon Ben-Gurion and his companions managed to amend this situation. According to Shabtai Teveth in these early years Ben-Gurion developed the concept of 'Avodah Ivrit', or 'Jewish labour'.

The leaders of the Second Aliyah agreed that Jewish labor was vital for the national revival process, as they were convinced that Jews should 'redeem' themselves by building with their own hands a new type of Jewish society. They also thought the use of Arab labor could create a typical colonial society, exploiting cheap, unorganized local labor, and would hamper further Jewish immigration. Finally they considered manual labor a good therapy for Jews as individuals and as a people. In Ben-Gurion's opinion, Jewish labor was "not a means but a sublime end", the Jew had to be transformed and made creative.

In 1907, Ben-Gurion called for Jewish labor on lands owned by the Jewish National Fund. There were difficulties here, because Arabs were prepared to work long hours for very low wages, and most Jewish immigrants preferred to settle in the cities. In this context occurred the development of the concept of the kibbutz, 'the co-operative settlement based on self-labour and motivated by Zionist ideals'. In a summary made in 1956, Ben-Gurion said the kibbutz movement was not started because of some socialist theory, but as an effective way to "guarantee Jewish labour".

Ben Gurion said:

We do not want to create a situation like that which exists in South Africa, where the whites are the owners and rulers, and the blacks are the workers. If we do not do all kinds of work, easy and hard, skilled and unskilled, if we become merely landlords, then this will not be our homeland. (David Ben-Gurion to Palestinian nationalist Musa Alami 1934)

=== Mandate period ===
Around 1920 Ben-Gurion began to call for Jewish labor in the entire economy, and labor Zionism started striving for an absolute segregation of the Jewish and Arab national communities. In this way 'Jews and Arabs [...] would live in separate settlements and work in separate economies'. In 1930 the Hope Simpson Report blamed the Jewish labor policy for the grave unemployment in the Arab sector. Ben-Gurion used the 1929 Palestine riots and the 1936 Arab general strike as opportunities to further enforce his drive for Jewish labor.

According to Flapan in 1933 the Histadrut launched its first campaign to remove Arab workers from the cities. In many cases the removal of Arab workers 'took the form of ugly scenes of violence'. Reports of this in the Jewish and Arab press 'created an atmosphere of unprecedented tension'. According to Flapan this forceful eviction of Arab workers and the 'acrimonious propaganda' which accompanied the operation amplified Arab hostility and ultimately precipitated the outbreak of the Arab revolt in 1936.

In 1947 the UN Special Commission on Palestine summarized the situation:

The economic life presents the complex phenomenon of two distinctive economies—one Jewish and one Arab, closely involved with one another and yet in essential features separate. . . . Apart from a small number of experts, no Jewish workers are employed in Arab undertakings and apart from citrus groves, very few Arabs are employed in Jewish enterprises. . . . Government service, the Potash company and the oil refinery are almost the only places where Arab and Jews meet as co-workers in the same organization. . . . There are considerable differences between the rates of wage for Arab and Jewish workers in similar occupations.

=== State of Israel ===
In recent times there have been attempts at reviving the practice of hiring exclusively Jewish labor in Israel and the occupied territories, particularly after the Second Intifada. While this is illegal in Israel since 1995, many employers, using a loophole in the law, cite overriding security concerns.

It 1995, the Israeli Employment (Equal Opportunities) Law was amended to prohibit discrimination based on nationality. (Note: In Israel, there is a distinction between concepts of "nationality" and "citizenship" for legal residents of Israel, and in the past the Israeli identity card contained the record "nationality")

Some organizations attempted to encourage "Hebrew labor" in apparently legal ways. An example is the "Hebrew Job Board" (לוח עבודה עברית) website, which was encouraging "Hebrew labor" by publishing the list of "Jew-only" businesses and warning about security risks and danger of hitbolelut (Jewish assimilation) involved in hiring non-Jews, It was found to be engaged in discrimination and ordered to pay a fine. In an appeal, the organization claimed that their purpose was the historical tradition of tzedakah (charitable work) aimed at helping Jews with their livelihoods, and vouched to amend their online activities to comply with the law.

Some right-wing organizations tried to ostracize the businesses that employ Arabs.

In March 2008, in light of the Mercaz HaRav massacre, perpetrated by an Arab East Jerusalem resident who was initially reported to have been an employee of the seminary, Rabbi Chaim Kanievsky ruled "it is completely forbidden to hire Arabs, especially in yeshivas" due to the "concern of endangering lives". One week later the Chief Rabbi of Hebron and Kiryat Arba, Rabbi Dov Lior ruled that "it is strictly prohibited to hire Arabs, or to rent houses on Israeli land to them. Their employment is out of the question, not only in the yeshivas but also in hotels or factories; basically anywhere."

== Terminology ==
=== Hebrew labor ===
"Hebrew labor" is often also referred to as "Jewish labor", although the former is the literal translation of "avoda ivrit". According to Even-Zohar the immigrants of the Second Aliyah preferred to use the word "Hebrew" because they wanted to emphasize the difference between their "new Hebrew" identity and the "old Diaspora Jewish" identity. For them the word "Hebrew" had romantic connotations with the "purity" and "authenticity" of the existence of the "Hebrew nation in its land", like it had been in the past.

Related to the concept of "Hebrew labor" was the concept of "alien labor". Ben-Gurion wrote about the settlers of the First Aliyah: "They introduced the idol of exile to the temple of national rebirth, and the creation of the new homeland was desecrated by avodah zara". According to Shapira avodah zara means both "alien labor" and, in a religious sense, "idol worship". Along with bloodshed and incest this is one of the three worst sins in Judaism. Application of this concept to the employment of Arab workers by Jews depicted this as a taboo.

== See also ==
- Labor Zionism
- Muscular Judaism
- Arab general strike (Mandatory Palestine)
- Antisemitic boycotts
  - Arab boycott
- Austerity in Israel
- Sursock Purchases

== Bibliography ==
- Even-Zohar, Itamar (1996) [1981]. "The emergence of a native Hebrew culture in Palestine: 1882–1948". In Reinharz, Jehuda; Shapira, Anita (eds.). Essential Papers on Zionism. Essential Papers on Jewish Studies. Vol. 3. NYU Press. pp. 727–729. ISBN 0-8147-7449-0. Revised reprint of article of the same title from Papers in Zionism 4 (October 1981), pp. 167–184, doi:10.1080/13531048108575807.
- Flapan, Simha (1979). Zionism and the Palestinians. Croom Helm. ISBN 9780064921046. Minimal text access via Google Books (15 September 2021).
- Gorni, Yosef (1987). Zionism and the Arabs, 1882-1948: A Study of Ideology. Translated by Chaya Galai. Clarendon Press. ISBN 9780198227212. No text access via Google Books (15 September 2021).
- Shafir, Gershon; Peled, Yoav (2002). Being Israeli: The Dynamics of Multiple Citizenship. Cambridge Middle East Studies. Vol. 16. Cambridge University Press. ISBN 9780521796729.
- Shapira, Anita (1999) [1992]. Land and Power: The Zionist Resort to Force, 1881-1948 (revised reprint ed.). Stanford U. Press. p. 64. ISBN 9780804737760.
- Smith, Charles D. (2001). Palestine and the Arab-Israeli Conflict (4th ed.). Palgrave Macmillan. p. 118. ISBN 9780333914427. No text access to any edition via Google Books (15 September 2021).
- Sternhell, Zeev (1998). The Founding Myths of Israel: Nationalism, Socialism, and the Making of the Jewish State (1st English ed.).
- Teveth, Shabtai (1985). Ben-Gurion and the Palestinian Arabs: From Peace to War. Oxford University Press. ISBN 9780195035629. Minimal text access via Google Books (15 September 2021).
