= Market Hall (Rotterdam) =

Residential building with market hall underneath, located in Rotterdam, Netherlands

Markthal
- Markthal
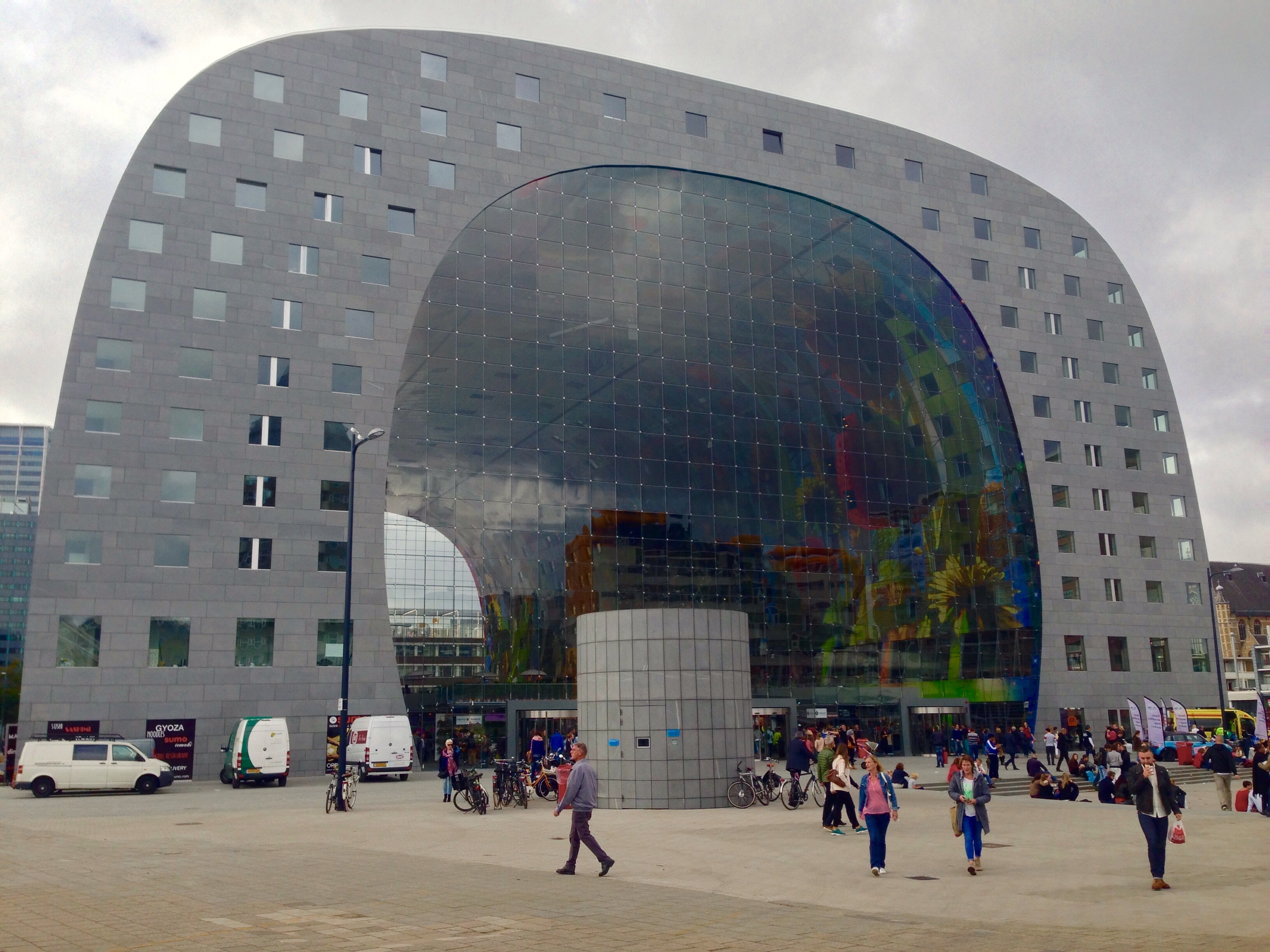
- The Markthal in 2015.

General information
- Status: Completed
- Location: Binnenrotte, Rotterdam, Netherlands
- Coordinates: 51°55′12″N 4°29′13″E
- Construction started: October 2009
- Completed: October 2014
- Opening: 1 October 2014
- Cost: €178,000,000

Height
- Roof: 40 m (131 ft)
- Top floor: 37 m (121 ft)

Technical details
- Floor count: 11; 4 below ground
- Lifts/elevators: 26

Design and construction
- Architect: MVRDV
- Developer: Provast
- Structural engineer: Royal HaskoningDHV

The Markthal (English: Market Hall) is a residential and office building with a market hall underneath, located in Rotterdam. The building was opened on October 1, 2014, by Queen Máxima of the Netherlands. Besides the large market hall, the complex houses 228 apartments, 4,600 m^{2} retail space, 1,600 m^{2} horeca and an underground 4-story parking garage with a capacity of over 1200 cars.

== Architecture ==
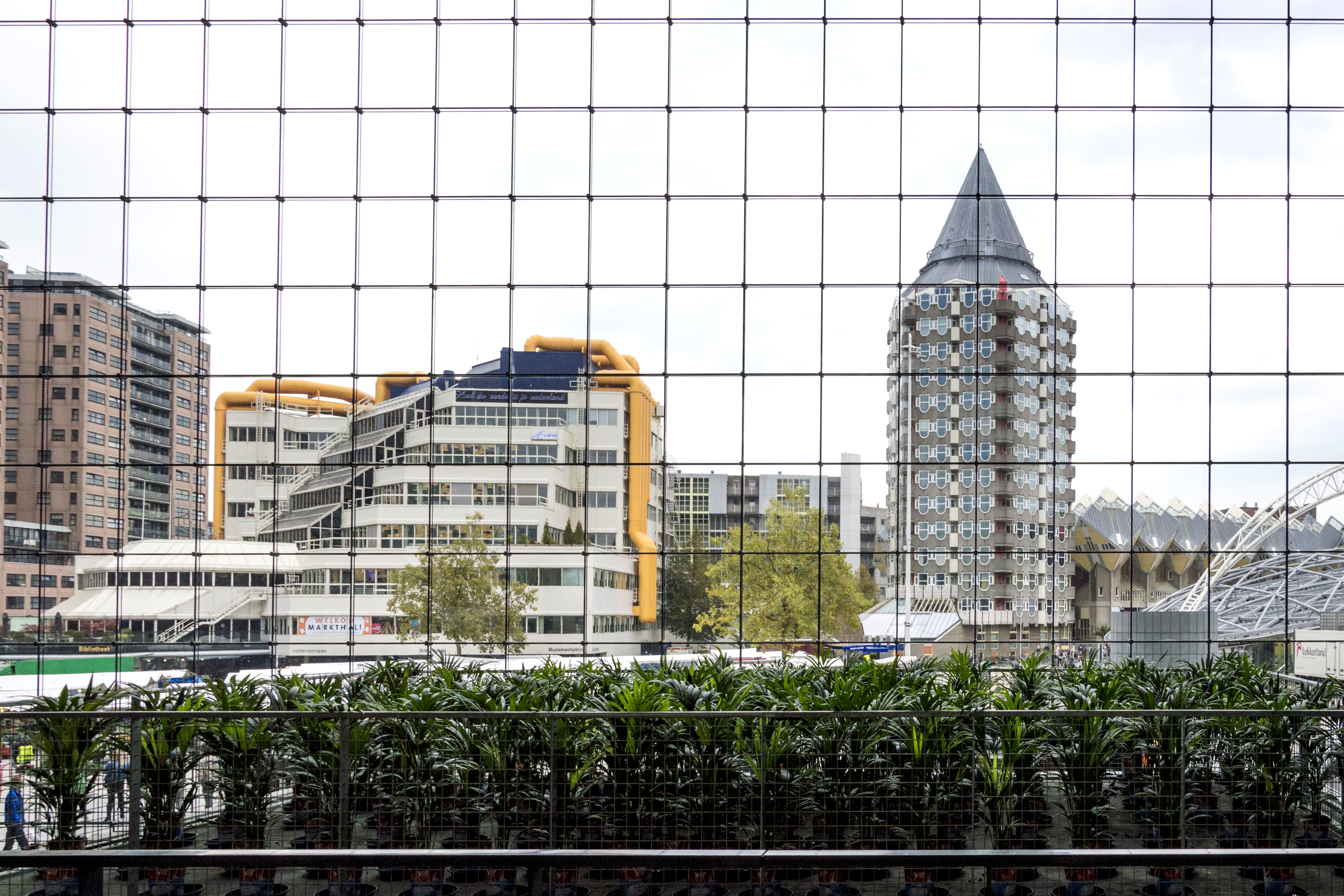
The glass windows of The Market Hall with in the background the Rotterdam Library (left) Blaak Tower (middle) and the cube houses (right).

The Markthal was designed by architectural firm MVRDV. The grey nature stone building has an archwise structure like a horseshoe. The building has a glass facade on both sides; these are made up of smaller glass windows. The smaller windows are mostly squared and around 1485 millimeters wide. All of these are hung around a structure of steel cables, 34 metres high and 42 metres wide, which makes it the largest glass-window cable structure in Europe. Each facade has 26 vertical and 22 horizontal cables. The facade was designed and installed by Octatube

== Artwork ==
The inside of the building is adorned with an 11,000m^{2} artwork by Arno Coenen and Iris Roskam, named Hoorn des Overvloeds (Horn of Plenty). The artwork shows strongly enlarged fruits, vegetables, seeds, fish, flowers and insects.

It was selected from nine international candidates. The work was made using digital 3D-techniques. The size of the digital file was 1.47 terabytes and required specialist servers, of the kind that are also used by Pixar Studios for making animated movies. The digital 3D-animation was separated into 4,000 pieces and then printed on perforated aluminum panels. The 4,000 aluminum panels are now on the inside of the hall. After the opening in 2014, the artwork gained a lot of international attention. Some called it The largest artwork in the world or The Sistine Chapel of Rotterdam.

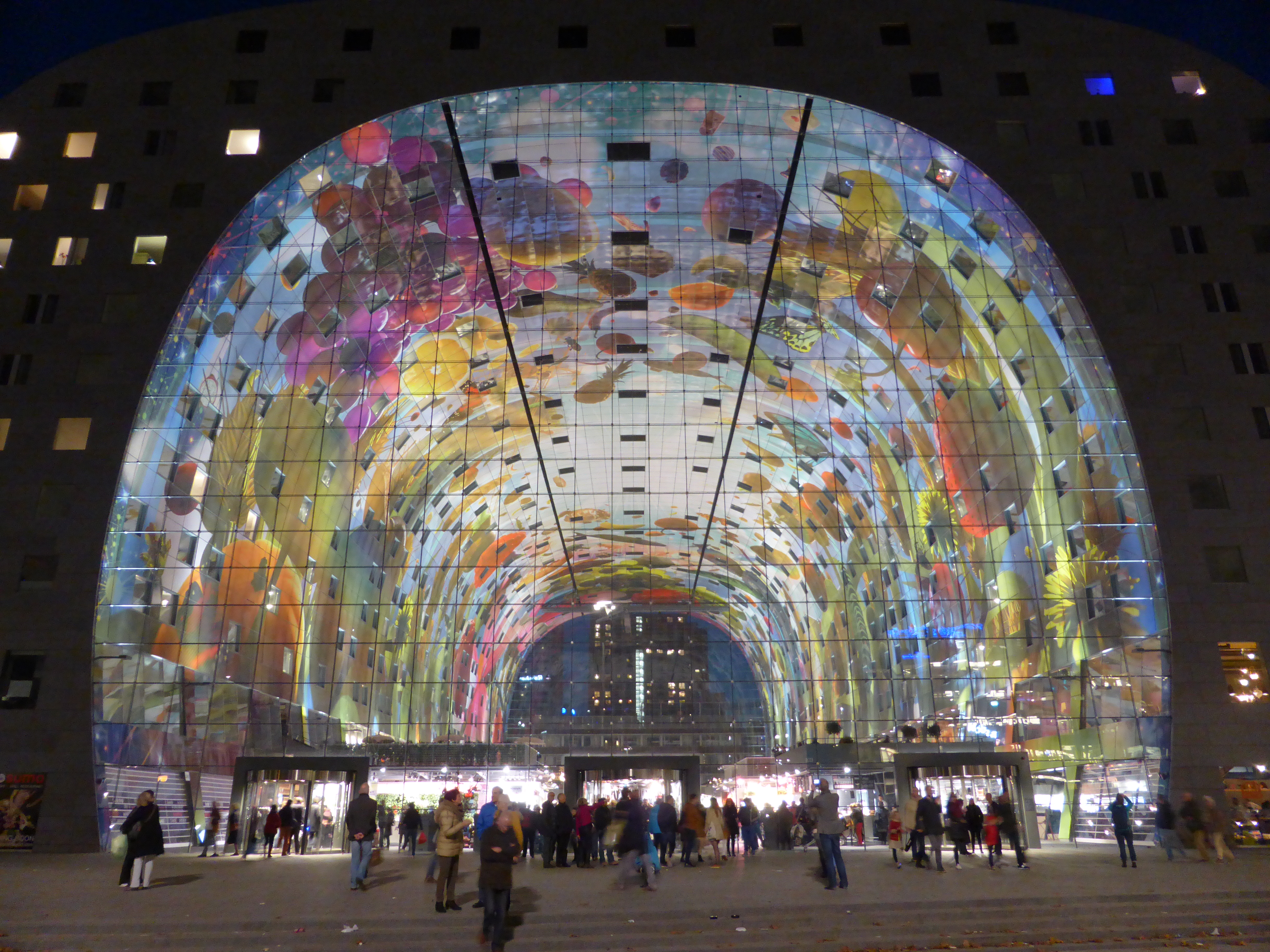

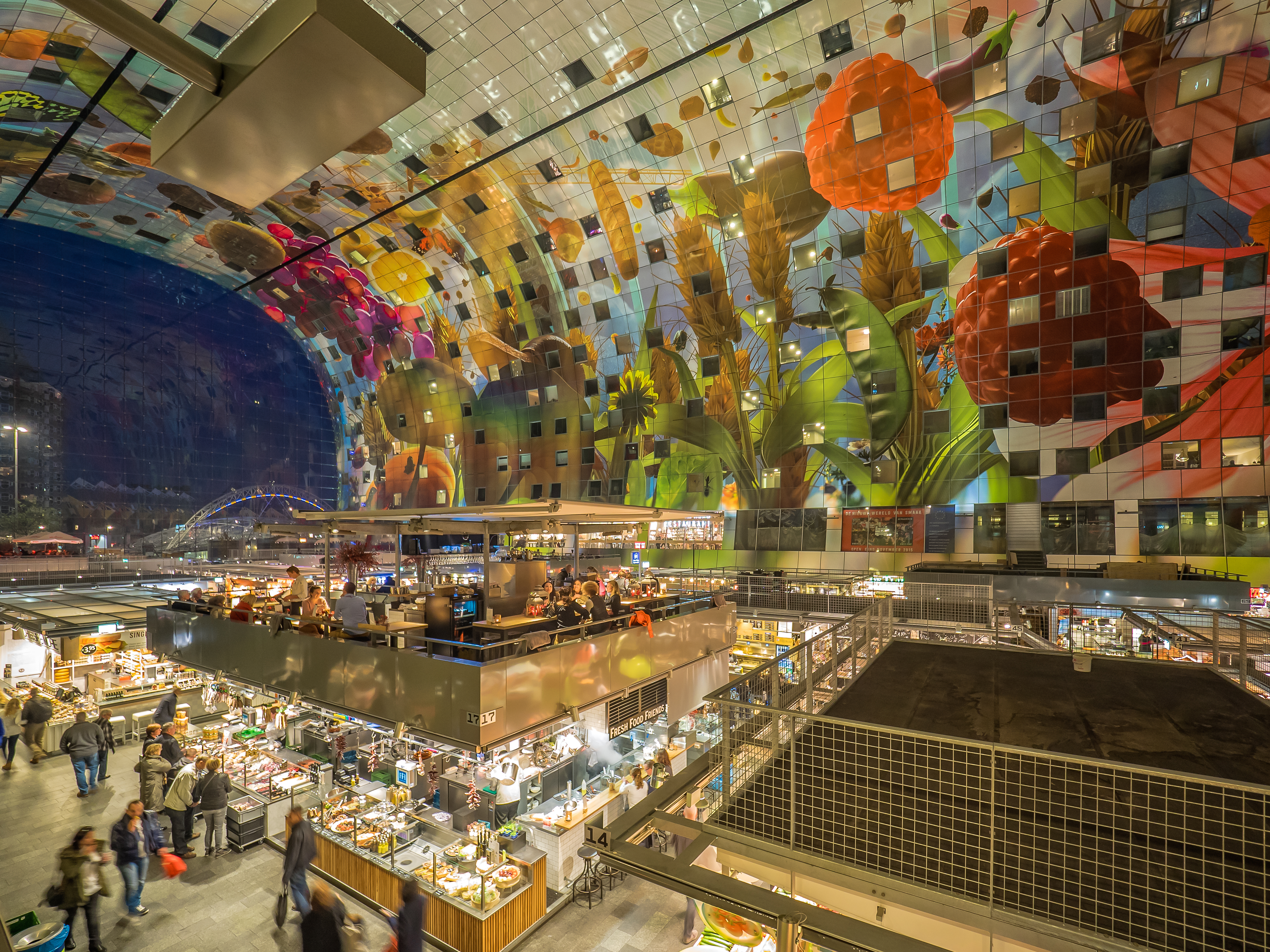

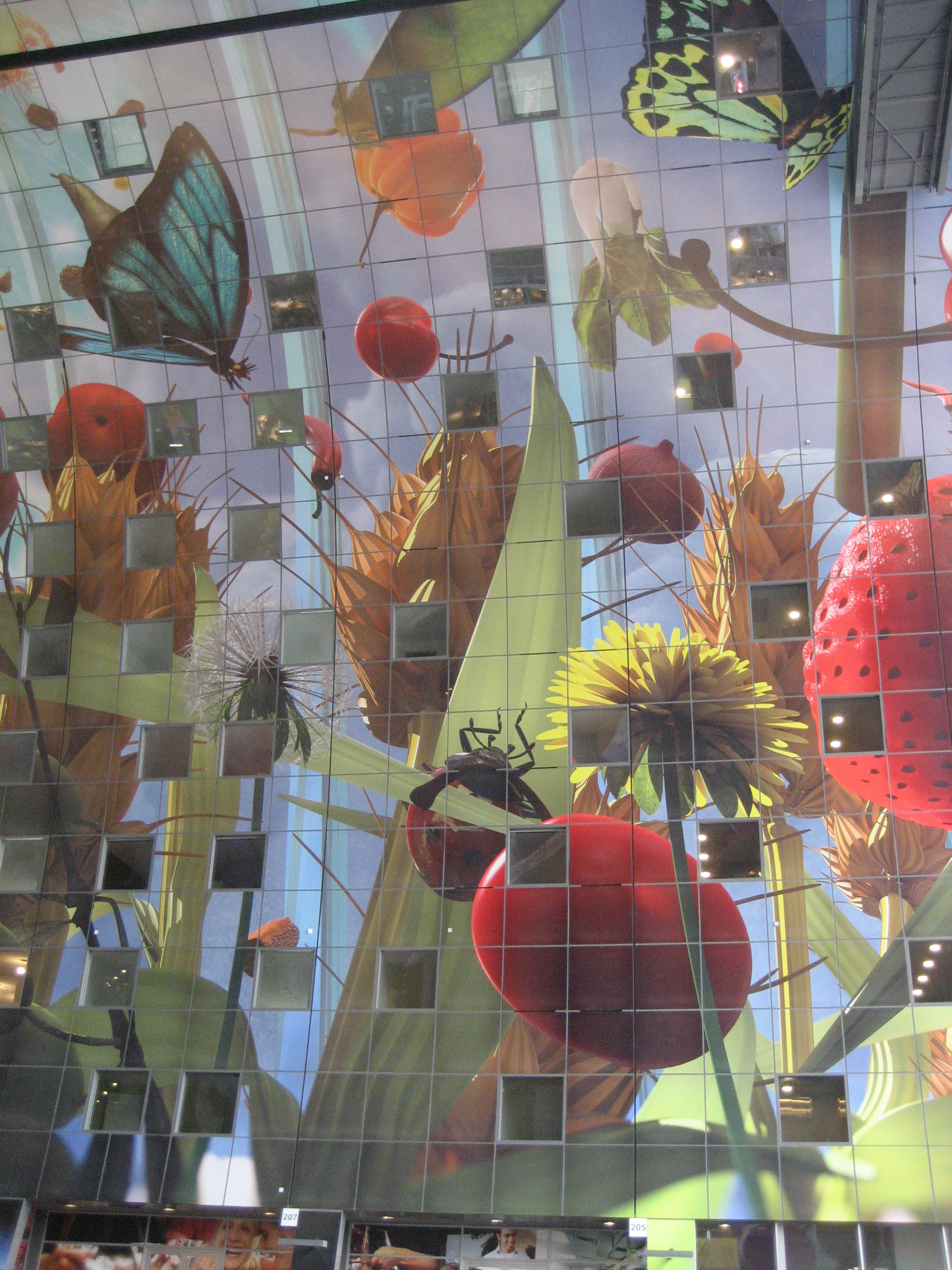

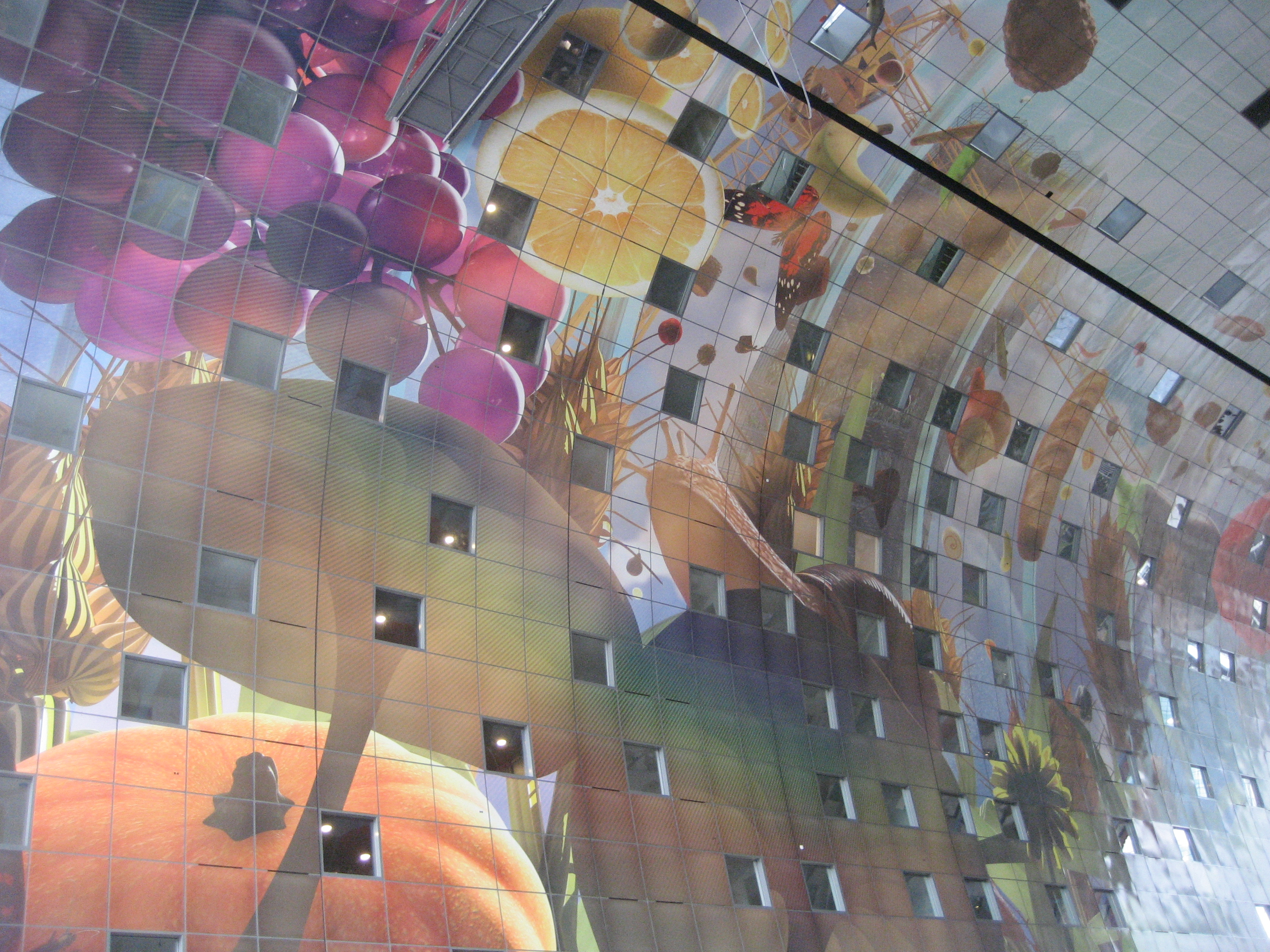

== Miscellany ==
- The 4-story parking garage of the Markthal is the largest in the center of Rotterdam.
- The Markthal was one of the first buildings in the world that could be seen by augmented reality. By using the application UAR, made by the NAi, users could see 3D-models of the building, and how it was going to look.
- A possible nickname of the Markthal is Koopboog. This name is a reference to the horseshoe shape of the hall and also refers to the nearby Koopgoot.

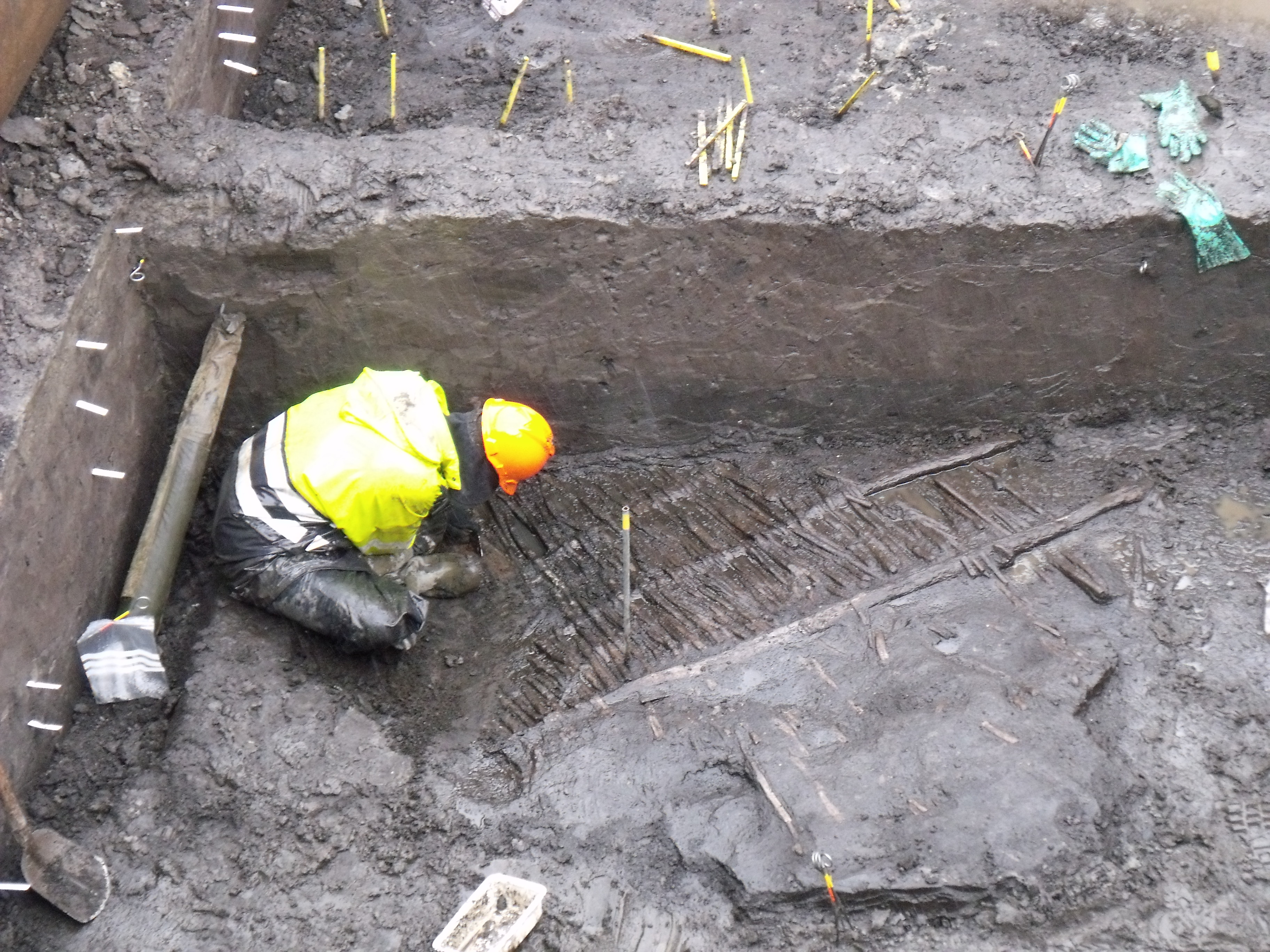
An archaeologist next to a buried farm (in Rotta), at the site of the Market Hall.

== Archaeological site ==
The Markthal is built on top of a fourteenth-century buried village in the Polder of Westnieuwland. This polder was surrounded by water and dykes to protect the polder during high-tide. There were a few houses and farms in this polder, also at the site of the Markthal.

During the building of the Markthal, a tenth-century farm was found 7 metres under the ground. Within the house were two stoves and a few fireplaces. The farm was part of a village before Rotterdam, named Rotta, after the river Rotte. The inhabitants of Rotta were farmers, craftsmen and traders. Earlier, a small settlement from the fourteenth-century was found on the site.

Several foundations on the site are now exhibited next to the central staircases underneath the Markthal.
