= Anita Shapira =

Israeli historian (born 1940)

- אניטה שפירא
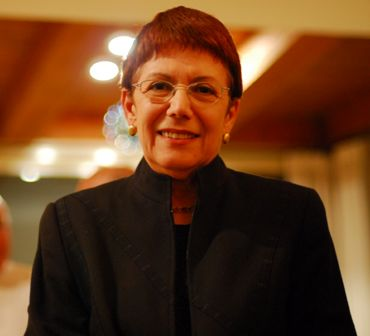
- Shapira in 2006
- Born: 1940 (age 85–86); Warsaw, German-occupied Poland
- Education: Tel Aviv University
- Scientific career
- Fields: Jewish history
- Workplaces: Tel Aviv University

Anita Shapira (Hebrew: אניטה שפירא; born 1940) is an Israeli historian. She is the founder of the Yitzhak Rabin Center, professor emerita of Jewish history at Tel Aviv University, and former head of the Weizmann Institute for the Study of Zionism at Tel Aviv University. She received the Israel Prize in 2008.

== Biography ==
Shapira was born in Warsaw, Poland, in 1940, immigrated to Mandatory Palestine in 1947 and grew up in Tel Aviv. The family lived on Yavneh Street, sharing a kitchen and bathroom with other families. Later, they moved to Yad Eliyahu.

She studied general and Jewish history at Tel Aviv University, completing her Ph.D. in 1974 under the supervision of Professor Daniel Carpi. Her dissertation, "The Struggle for Hebrew Labor, 1929-1939," indicated her interest in the history of the Labor Zionist movement, which was to be a continuing focus of her research. In 1985, she was appointed full professor at Tel Aviv University, serving from 1990-95 as dean of the Faculty of Humanities. From 1995 until 2009, she held the Ruben Merenfeld Chair for the Study of Zionism. From 2000 to 2012, she was head of the Chaim Weizmann Institute for the Study of Zionism and Israel at Tel Aviv University. From 2008 to 2013, she was a director at the Israel Democracy Institute.

From 1985 to 1989, she was a member of the Planning and Budgeting Commission of the Council for Higher Education in Israel; in 1987-90 she was chair of the board of Am Oved publishing house; since 1988 she has been a board member of the Zalman Shazar Institute. In 2002–2008, she was president of the Memorial Foundation for Jewish Culture. She founded the Yitzhak Rabin Center for Israel Studies and was its first director in 1996–99.

She is a member of the editorial board of the Jewish Review of Books, academic co-editor with Prof. Steven J. Zipperstein of the biography series "Jewish Lives" published by Yale University Press, and academic co-editor with Prof. Derek J. Penslar of the Journal of Israeli History.

== Research ==
Shapira's research focuses on the political, cultural, social, intellectual and military history of the Jewish community in Palestine (the Yishuv) and Israel.

Shapira's last book, Ben-Gurion: Father of Modern Israel, strives to get to the core of the complex man who would become the face of the new Jewish nation. Shapira tells the Ben-Gurion story anew, focusing especially on the period after 1948, during the first years of statehood. She provides fascinating and original insights into Ben-Gurion's personal qualities and those that defined his political leadership.

Her first book, based on her doctoral dissertation, Hama’avak Hanihzav: Avoda Ivrit 1929-1939 (The Futile Struggle: Hebrew Work 1929-1939), deals with the social and political history of the Yishuv in the 1920s and 1930s, including the controversies on policy towards the Arab population and the conflicts between left and right on the means for achieving Zionist goals.

Her second book, Berl: The Biography of a Socialist Zionist, Berl Katznelson, 1887-1944, was widely acclaimed by the general reading public as well as in academia and was published in Hebrew in eight editions. Focusing on a major figure in the Labor Zionist movement, this book portrays the history, society, and culture of the Yishuv from the Second Aliyah to the end of World War II.

During work on a biography of Yigal Allon, Shapira became interested in the role of force in the Zionist movement, initially inspired by an article by Menachem Begin during the 1982 Lebanon War on “A War of Choice.” This resulted in a book, Herev Hayona: Hatziyonut vehakoah, 1881-1948 (Land and Power: The Zionist Resort to Force, 1881-1948). In her biography of Yigal Allon, Yigal Allon, Native Son: A Biography, Shapira in fact portrays the development of the entire Palmach generation in Palestine, the first native-born Sabra generation.

During this period, she also began investigating issues related to culture and collective memory, as evident in articles on Latrun and S. Yizhar’s short story “Hirbet Hize,” and on the attitudes of Israeli society to the Holocaust and Holocaust survivors. Her book Hatanakh vehazehut hayisraelit (The Bible and Israeli identity) seeks to explain why the status of the Bible has declined in Israeli identity. Issues of identity, culture, and memory are also the focus of two collections of essays, Yehudim Hadashim, Yehudim Yeshanim (New Jews, Old Jews), and Yehudim, Tziyonim Umah shebeinehem (Jews, Zionists and Between).

Many of her books have been translated into English, German, Polish, Russian, and French.

From 2004-2005, she pursued her research through a fellowship at the Katz Center for Advanced Judaic Studies.

In a podcast interview conducted with her in October 2019, Shapira discussed her writing approach: "I never think about the audience. The audience does not exist when I write. I write what I believe is the closest to the truth I can reach [...] A researcher must have the ability to observe the protagonists from the outside, those he or she writes about... That must be their perspective. And perhaps that is what makes the difference between dull writing and writing that allows the reader to connect with the writer, not necessarily with the text itself [...] I write about topics where the human drama moves me".

== Published works ==
- Berl: The Biography of a Socialist Zionist, Berl Katznelson, 1887-1944/ Anita Shapira, translated by Haya Galai. Cambridge University Press, 1984, ISBN 0-521-25618-6
- Land and Power: The Zionist Resort to Force, 1881-1948 (Studies in Jewish History)/ Anita Shapira; translated by William Templer. Oxford University Press, 1992, ISBN 0-19-506104-7)
- Essential papers on Zionism / edited by Jehuda Reinharz and Anita Shapira. New York: New York University Press, 1996.
- Zionism and religion / Shmuel Almog, Jehuda Reinharz and Anita Shapira, editors. Hanover: Brandeis University Press in association with the Zalman Shazar Center for Jewish History, 1998.
- Israeli historical revisionism: from left to right / edited by Anita Shapira and Derek Penslar. Portland, Ore.: Frank Cass, 2003.
- Israeli identity in transition / edited by Anita Shapira. Westport, CT: Praeger, 2004.
- Brenner: Sippur hayim ("Yosef Haim Brenner: A Biography"), Am Oved, 2008.
- Yigal Allon, Native Son: A Biography / Anita Shapira, translated by Evelyn Abel. University of Pennsylvania Press, 2008, ISBN 978-0-8122-4028-3
- Israel: A history, Brandeis University Press, 2012.
- Yosef Haim Brenner: A Life, Stanford University Press, 2014.
- Ben-Gurion: Father of Modern Israel, Yale University Press, 2014.

== Awards ==
- In 1977, she was awarded a prize from the Ben-Zvi Institute for her book Hama’avak Hanihzav (The Futile Struggle).
- In 1992, the Am Oved publishing house awarded her a prize, on the occasion of its 50th anniversary, for the best non-fiction book, Herev Hayona (Land and Power), the English version of which won the National Jewish Book Award in 1993 in the category Israel.
- In 2004, she was awarded the Zalman Shazar prize in Jewish History, for her biography of Yigal Allon.
- In 2005, she won the Herzl Prize for her excellence in Zionist research from the city of Herzliya.
- In 2008, she was awarded the Israel Prize in Jewish history.
- In 2012, she was awarded the National Jewish Book Award in the History category for her book Israel: A History
- In 2014, her book Israel: A History was also awarded the Azrieli Award for Best Book in Israel Studies in English or French.

== See also ==
- List of Israel Prize recipients
