= Arab general strike =

1936 political action

- Part of the 1936–1939 Arab revolt in Palestine
- Location: Mandatory Palestine
- Date: April–October 1936
- Attack type: Protests
- Perpetrator: Arab Higher Committee

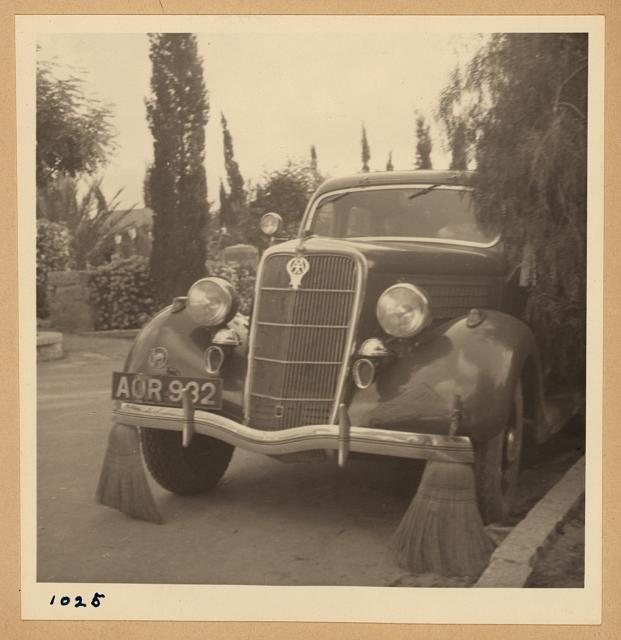
The Great Arab Revolt 1936, a vehicle for removing nails from the road

A general strike involving many Arabs in Mandatory Palestine, encompassing labor, transportation, and commercial activities, commenced on April 19, 1936, extending until October of the same year. This strike escalated into violence, marking the onset of the 1936–1939 Arab revolt in Palestine. These strikes represent a component of the undocumented, detailed civilian resistance carried out by the Palestinian population, with the majority of them not directly participating in the warfare against the colonial government.

== Background ==
As part of the intercommunal conflict, some Arab leaders sought to orchestrate boycotts from 1922, with the official commencement of the British Mandate for Palestine. Arab dissent was influenced by the Qassamite rebellion following the killing of Sheikh Izz ad-Din al-Qassam by the Palestine Police Force in 1935, as well as the declaration by Mohammad Amin al-Husayni of 16 May 1930 as 'Palestine Day' and calling for a general strike on this day, following the 1929 Palestine riots.

In Egypt, anti-British demonstrations in November 1935 brought about the resumption of negotiations between the two countries for a treaty of independence. In Mandatory Syria a promise in March 1936 from the French authorities of self-government was made to end the 50-day Syrian general strike.

== Timeline ==
The strike began on 20 April in Nablus, where an Arab National Committee was formed, and by the end of the month National Committees had been formed in all of the towns and some of the larger villages, including Haifa, Jenin, Tulkarm and Jerusalem. On 21 April the leaders of the five main parties accepted the decision at Nablus and called for a general strike of all Arabs engaged in labour, transport and shopkeeping for the following day.

While the strike was initially organised by workers and local committees, religious leaders, influential families and political leaders became involved to help with co-ordination. This led to the formation on 25 April 1936 of the Arab Higher Committee (AHC) under the chairmanship of Amin al-Husseini. The Committee resolved "to continue the general strike until the British Government changes its present policy in a fundamental manner". The demands of the Committee included: (1) the prohibition of Jewish immigration; (2) the prohibition of the transfer of Arab land to Jews; (3) the establishment of a National Government responsible to a representative council. On 15 May 1936, the Committee endorsed the general strike, calling for an end to Jewish immigration and a general non-payment of taxes.

The response of the British to the strike was to impose heavy fines on villages and cities. The city-port of Jaffa was especially singled out. Under the guise of urban renewal the British ordered the demolition of hundreds of homes in the city and more than a thousand in neighbouring villages. The British also authorised the building of a port in neighboring Tel Aviv to compete with the strike-bound Port of Jaffa.

Solidarity campaign committees were formed in Damascus, Baghdad, Cairo and Beirut.

The strike was eventually called off in November 1936, by the HAC, under the influence of Britain. King Ghazi of Iraq, King Abdul-Aziz of Saudi Arabia and Emir Abdullah of Transjordan appealed to the workers to end the strike because as they wrote in Palestinian newspapers, "We rely on the good intentions of our friend Great Britain, who has declared that she will do justice."

== See also ==
- Labor Zionism
- Hebrew labor
- Arab League boycott of Israel

== Bibliography ==
- Nicosia, Francis R. (2000). The Third Reich and the Palestine Question. Transaction Publishers. ISBN 978-0-7658-0624-6.
