= Yitzhak Rabin Center =

Library and research center in Tel Aviv, Israel

Coordinates: 32.102894°N 34.799782°E

- מרכז יצחק רבין
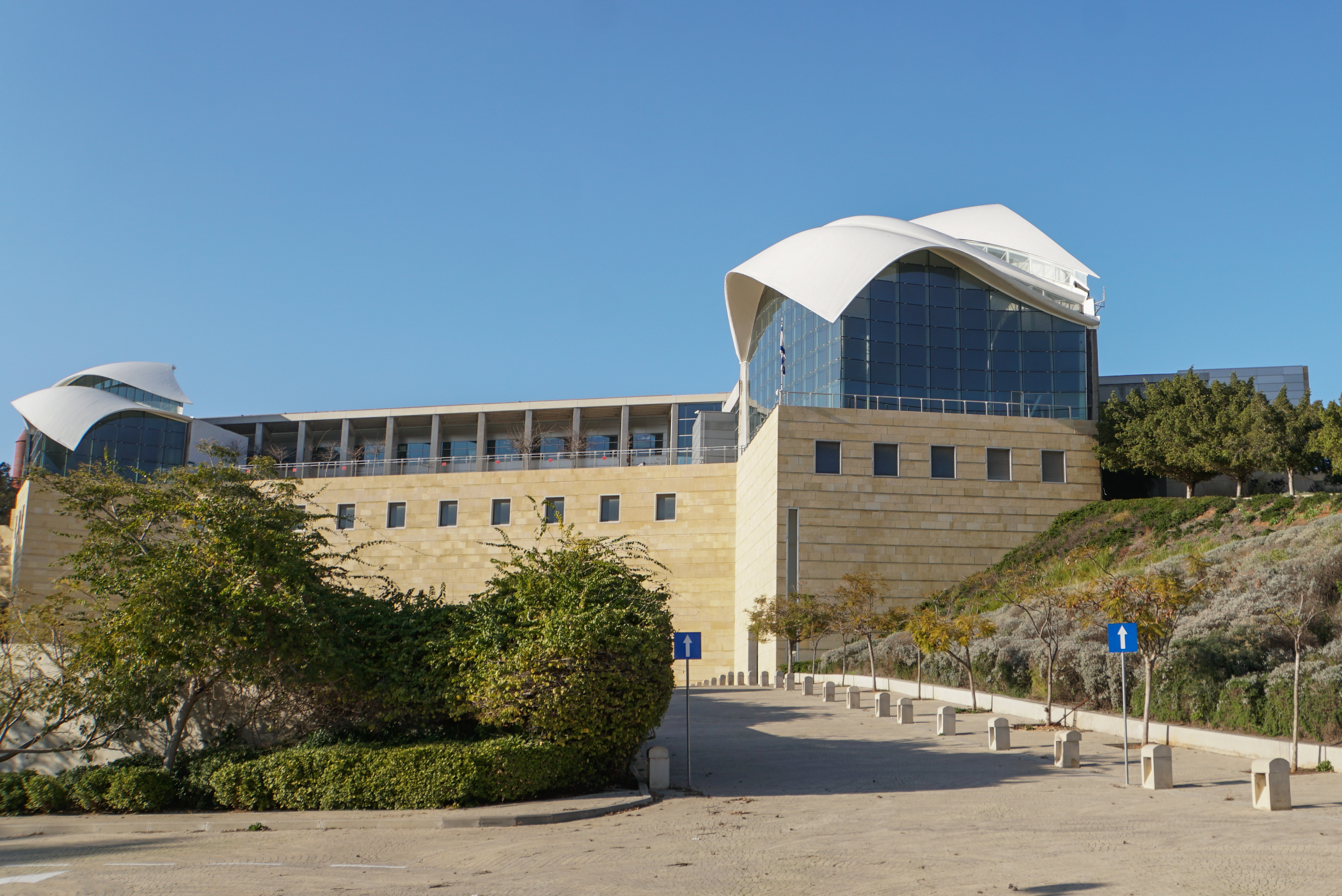
- Yitzhak Rabin Center
- Established: November 2005
- Location: Tel Aviv, Israel
- Type: Library and Research Center
- Collections: Exhibition on Israeli society, democracy, and the life of Yitzhak Rabin
- Architect: Moshe Safdie
- Website: Yitzhak Rabin Center

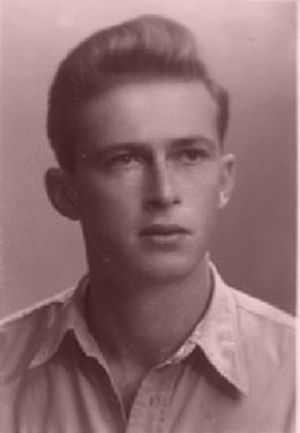
Rabin shortly before joining the Palmach

The Yitzhak Rabin Center is a library and research center in Tel Aviv, Israel, built in memory of assassinated Israeli prime minister Yitzhak Rabin. Designed by Israeli architect Moshe Safdie, it sits on a hill commanding a panoramic view of Yarkon Park and Tel Aviv, near the Eretz Israel Museum, the Palmach Museum, Tel Aviv University and ANU Museum of the Jewish People. The center was inaugurated in November 2005, on the tenth anniversary of Rabin's assassination.

== History ==
The center was erected on the foundations of a top secret power station known as "Reading G" or "J'ora." Built in 1954–1956 to supply power in the event of an enemy bombing, it was financed in part by the German reparations agreement.

Architect Moshe Safdie from Boston, Massachusetts was asked to design the Rabin Centre. He cooperated in the design-build with Octatube in Delft, Netherlands.

== Museum ==
A permanent exhibition at the Rabin Center is dedicated to the history of society and democracy in Israel with the life of Yitzhak Rabin serving as a connecting thread between the various sections.
