= Haskoning =

Engineering consultancy firm

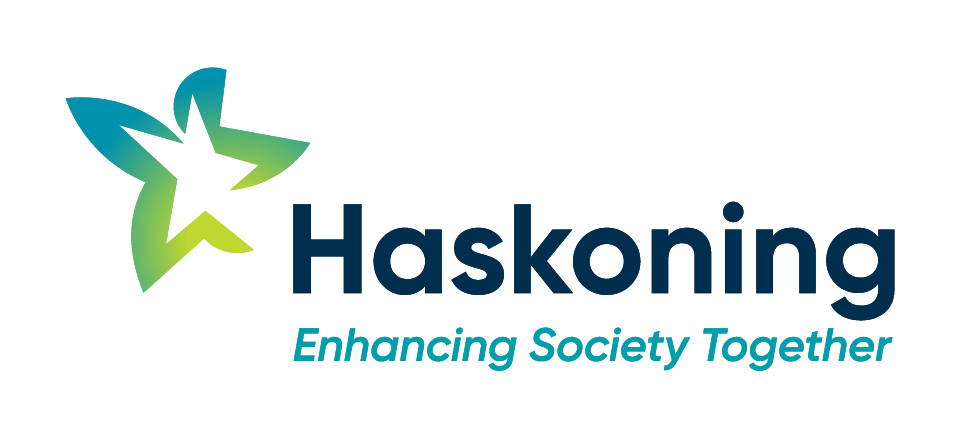
- Type: Private
- Industry: project management, engineering and consultancy
- Predecessor: Royal Haskoning, DHV, Royal HaskoningDHV
- Founded: Amersfoort, Netherlands (July 2, 2012) Nijmegen, Netherlands as Hassselt & De Koning (October 15, 1881) Rotterdam, Netherlands and The Hague, Netherlands as DHV (January 1, 1917)
- Founders: Johannes van Hasselt, Jacobus de Koning, Adriaan WC Dwars, Arie D Heederik & Bastiaan A Verhey
- Headquarters: Amersfoort, Netherlands
- Number of locations: 27 countries (2024)
- Area served: Worldwide
- Key people: Marije Hulshof (CEO)
- Revenue: €810 million (2024)
- Net income: €41 million (2024)
- Number of employees: 6,488 (2024)
- Website: haskoning.com

Haskoning, formerly known as Royal HaskoningDHV, is an international, non-listed engineering consultancy firm with headquarters in Amersfoort, Netherlands. It has offices in 30 countries, employing more than 6000 professionals worldwide.

Haskoning is active in aviation, buildings, energy, industry, infrastructure, maritime, rural and urban development, and water.

== Financial history ==
Year	Turnover	Net income	Employees
2024	▲€810 million	▲€41.0 million	6,488
2023	▲€736 million	▲€24.8 million	5,675
2022	▲€699 million	▼€13.7 million	6,551
2021	▲€624 million	▲€15.2 million	5,721
2020	▼€594 million	▲€13.0 million	5,781
2019	▲€650 million	▼€9.2 million	5,844
2018	▲€599 million	▼€12.7 million	5,818
2017	▼€585 million	▲€12.8 million	5,830
2016	▼€621 million	▲€12.1 million	6,197
2015	▲€667 million	▲€11.8 million	6,500
2014	▼€655 million	▲€6.3 million	6,300
2013	▼€667 million	▲€−3.4 million	6,400
2012	€702 million	€−19.9 million	6,900

== History ==
=== Royal Haskoning ===
Johan van Hasselt taught civil engineering at the Royal Netherlands Military Academy in Breda for a year before starting his own engineering firm in Nijmegen. Jacobus de Koning joined as a partner on October 15, 1881, and the engineering firm Hasselt & De Koning was established. The name of the firm changed quite a lot over the years. The name 'Haskoning' made its debut in the letterhead in the autumn of 1976. The acronym Haskoning started out as a telegram address. Reducing the length of the name was extremely practical because of the many international telegrams. In 1981 the company received the designation 'Royal' and one year later the legend changed to 'Koninklijk Ingenieurs- en Architectenbureau'. During the integration in 2001 the company name was changed to 'Royal Haskoning'.

=== DHV ===
Bastiaan Verhey had a well-paid job at the Navy Pilotage but his work ethic and entrepreneurial spirit made him desire for a life as a self-employed person. On 2 June 1916 he walked into Arnold Groothoff in The Hague, a classmate from Delft. Groothoff returned from the Dutch East Indies the other day. Intensive discussions followed and two weeks later they decided to start an advisory engineering company on 1 January 1917. Verhey is employed by the Navy until 1 December but Groothoff explored his relations, and soon the partners get to work, long before the official launch date. When in the autumn of 1916 it is apparent Groothoff will return to the West Indies, Verhey approaches his acquaintance Adriaan Dwars. Both gentlemen come to an agreement in November 1916. At the same time, they are exploring a partnership with Arie Heederik, who has been leading bureau Schotel in Rotterdam for decades. The meetings are successful and even before the bureau Dwars, Groothoff and Verhey officially starts, they decided on a merger. This creates a new partnership on New Year's Day 1917: 'de Vereenigde Ingenieursbureaux voor Bouw- en Waterbouwkunde te Rotterdam en 's-Gravenhage'. In 1934 the company changes its name to 'Ingenieursbureau Dwars, Heederik en Verhey', abbreviated as 'DHV'.

=== Merger ===
In February 2012 both companies announced the intended merger. In July 2012 the merger was official and Royal HaskoningDHV was established. In 2025, it was decided to shorten the name Royal HaskoningDHV to simply "Haskoning."

== Projects ==
- Canal del Dique
- Eko Atlantic
- Erasmus Hospital
- Fehmarn Belt Fixed Link
- Hong Kong–Zhuhai–Macau Bridge
- Hvidovre Hospital
- Maasvlakte 2
- Market Hall Rotterdam
- New international airport for Mexico City
- Nicaragua Canal
- One Angel Square
- Padstow Lifeboat Station
- Palm Jebel Ali
- Seine–Nord Europe Canal
- The World (archipelago)
- Vizhinjam International Seaport
- IKEA projects Saudi Arabia
- Beijing Daxing International Airport
