= Iris Roskam =

Dutch visual artist (born 1976)

- Born: 1976 (age 49–50); Delft
- Education: Willem de Kooning Academy, AKI; pupil of Bernard Heesen

Iris Roskam (born 1976) is a Dutch visual artist, glass artist and ceramicist.

== Life ==
Roskam was born in Delft. She studied at the Willem de Kooning Academy in Rotterdam and at the AKI in Enschede. From 1995 she was a glassblower at the Oude Horn glassworks in Acquoy. She was a pupil of Bernard Heesen.

From 2006 to 2018 she and Arno Coenen worked together as an artist duo. In 2016 the two were also a married couple.

== Work with Arno Coenen ==
Commissioned by the Port of Amsterdam, Coenen and Roskam made Box Bar A in 2007, a shipping container for the ART-on-a-BOX campaign, which was meant to promote Amsterdam abroad as a hub for container shipping and logistics. For its presentation at that year's Uitmarkt, Roskam fitted out the interior as a harbour pub.

Horn of Plenty, Markthal, Rotterdam

For the Markthal in Rotterdam, which opened on 1 October 2014, they made the ceiling artwork Horn of Plenty (Hoorn des overvloeds), commissioned by Provast: prints on aluminium panels with a surface area of 11,000 m^{2}. The work shows greatly enlarged images of insects, fish, flowers, fruit, vegetables and grains, among other things. The duo were assisted by designers and animators. In 2015 Horn of Plenty was one of the nominees in the Habitat category of the Dutch Design Awards, and it featured on the cover of the Dutch Design Yearbook.

The World is Yours followed in 2015, commissioned by the municipality of Rotterdam: a luminous globe of metal and LED lighting, 3 metres in diameter, on the roof of a small electricity building on the Tiendplein. The work carries the text The World is Yours, a quotation from the film Scarface; the artists meant it to give young people in the area self-confidence.

With Hans van Bentem, Coenen and Roskam made Amsterdam Oersoep (Amsterdam primordial soup) in the Beurspassage in Amsterdam in 2016, a 450 m^{2} artwork on the theme of the city's canals. It consists of a mosaic ceiling, a terrazzo floor and tiled panels with gold leaf along the walls. In total the work has more than a million glass mosaic tiles.

In August 2018 the housing association Woningstichting Den Helder announced that Roskam and Coenen would make artworks for the facades and porches of post-war blocks of flats in the Waddenzeestraat in Den Helder as part of their renovation.

== Gallery ==
Horn of Plenty, Markthal, Rotterdam

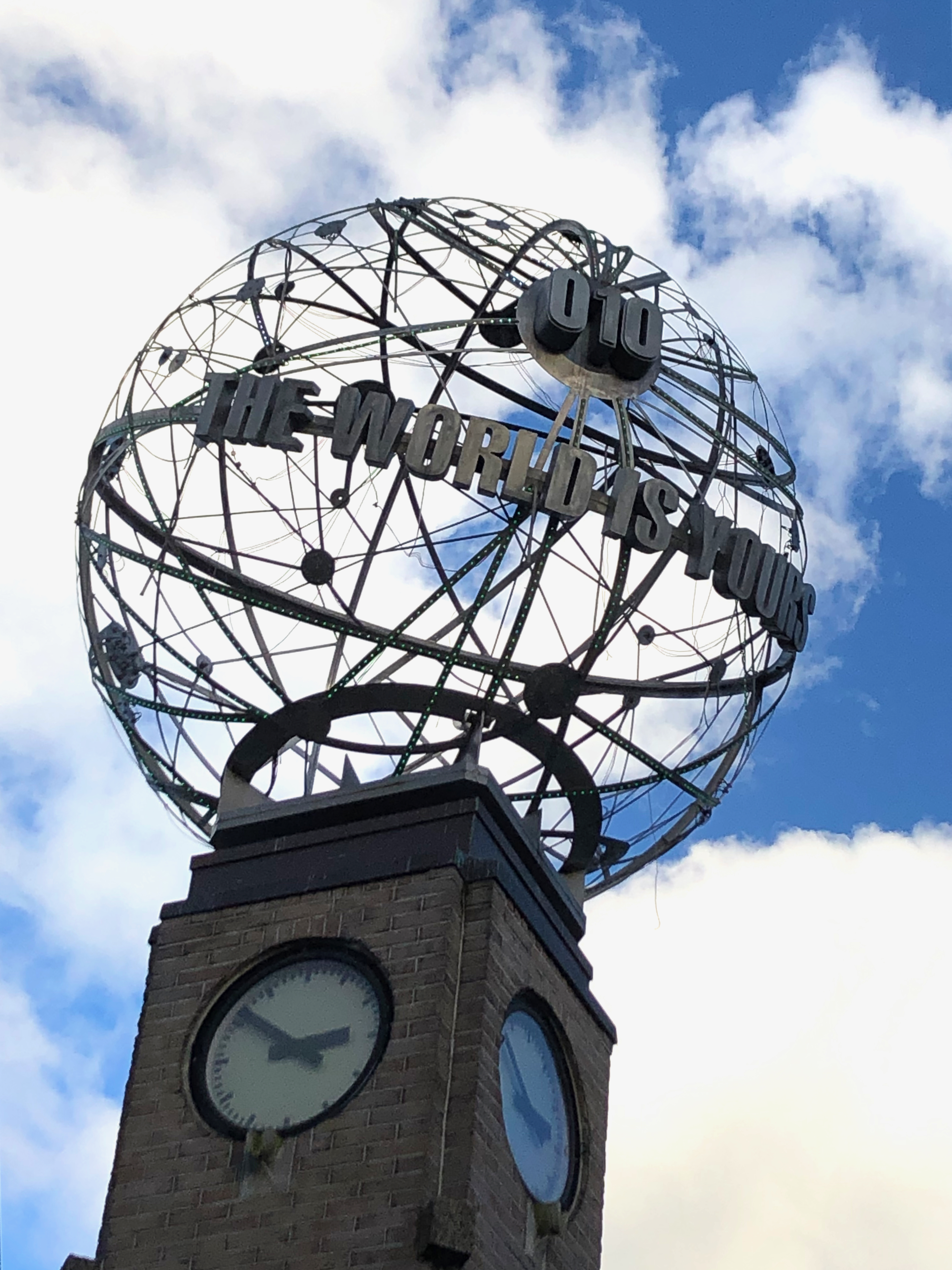
The World is Yours (2015), Rotterdam West

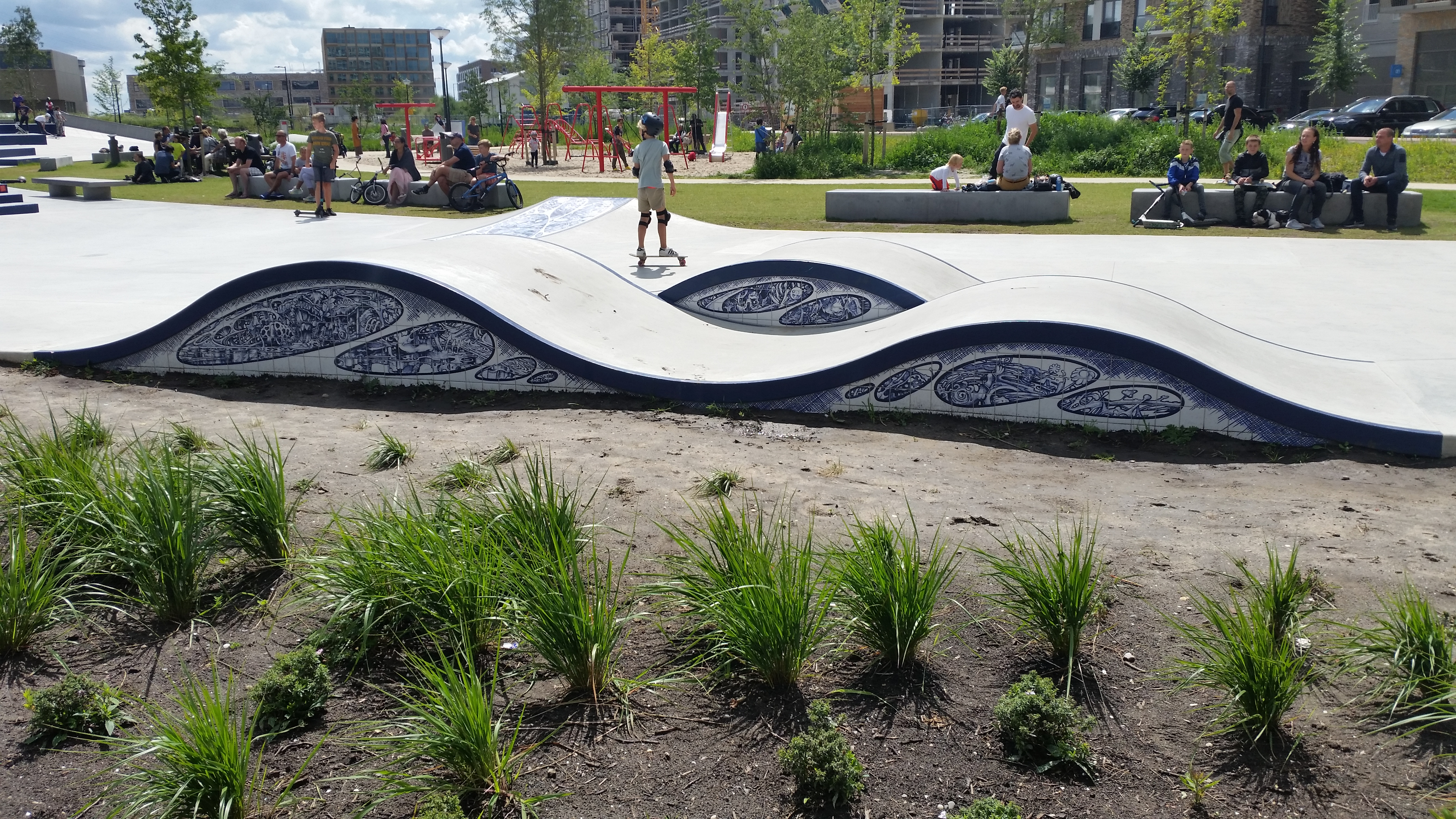
An outcast sanctuary, Zeeburgereiland, Amsterdam

Amsterdam Oersoep in the Beurspassage, Amsterdam

Schuttersmonument (shooting guild monument), Stein, Limburg

Art on a block of flats in the Waddenzeestraat, Den Helder

Art on a block of flats in the Waddenzeestraat, Den Helder
