= Arno Coenen =

Dutch visual artist (born 1972)

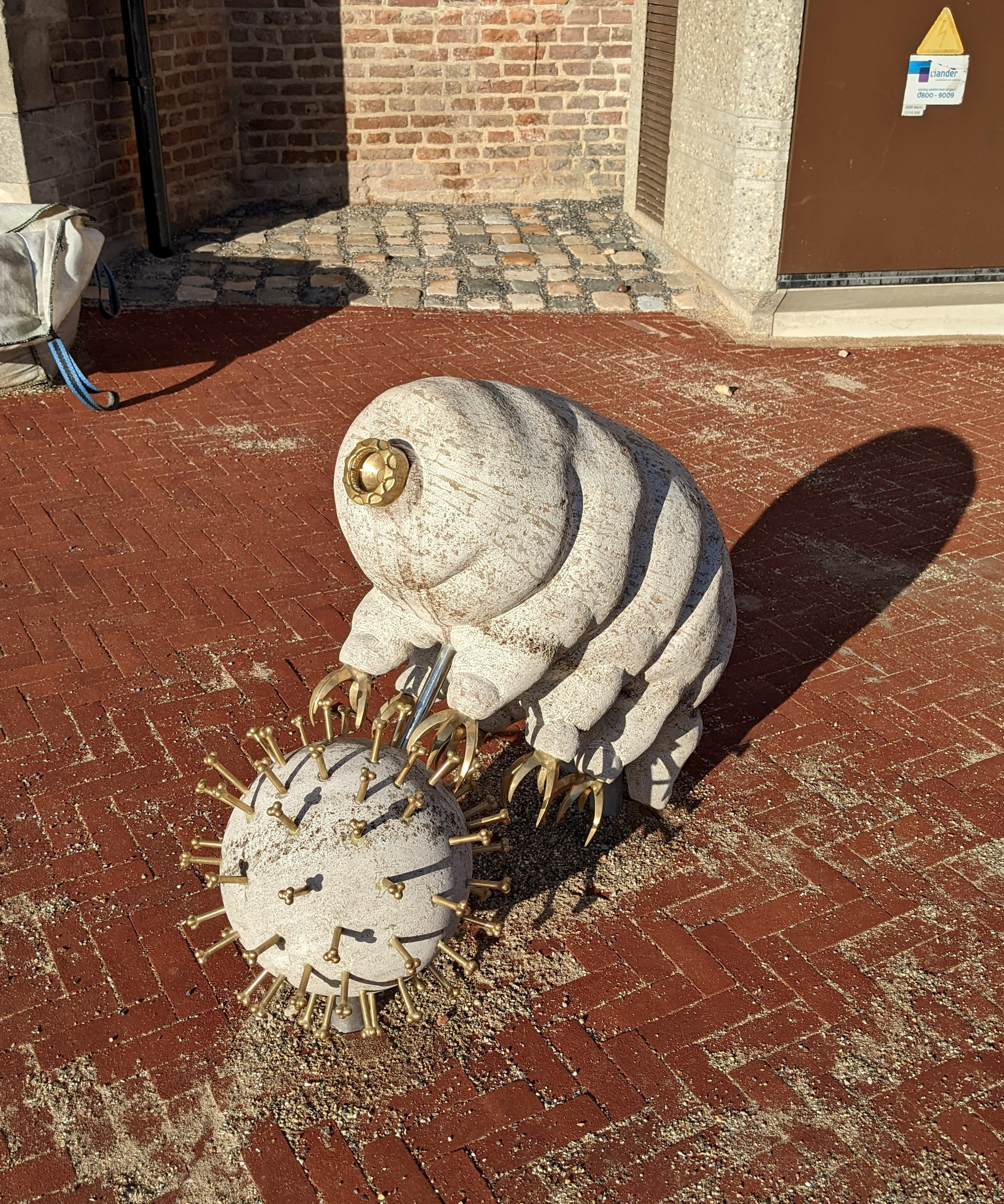
- 'Ark van Noach 3.0' (Noah's Ark 3.0) by Arno Coenen
- Born: 1972 (age 53–54); Deventer, Netherlands
- Education: Academie Minerva, Groningen (1997); MFA computer graphics, Media-GN, Groningen (1998)
- Known for: Visual art, digital media; Horn of Plenty, inner façade of the Markthal, Rotterdam
- Website: arnocoenen.art

Arno Coenen (born 1972 in Deventer, Netherlands) is a Dutch visual artist who makes extensive use of digital media in his work.

== Life and working method ==
Arno Coenen graduated in 1997 from the Academie Minerva in Groningen. A year later he also obtained an MFA in computer graphics at Media-GN, Groningen. He lives and works in Dordrecht.

Coenen works across a wide range of media: from video art and 3D animation to stained glass and mosaic. All of his projects are developed with the aid of computers. His work frequently connects with contemporary subcultures, youth culture, and popular culture. He is particularly interested in outspoken subcultures such as hooliganism, heavy metal, and martial arts.

Coenen's art is described as accessible and having a social character, and he is regularly described as a "people's artist". On most of his projects, Coenen works in collaboration with others. From 1994 to 1999 he worked regularly with fellow artist René Bosma. Coenen is also active as a VJ, curator, and organiser.

In June 2022, Coenen was introduced to OpenAI — the American artificial intelligence research company — by creative director Rodger Werkhoven, who is based in Amsterdam. At the time, OpenAI's image-generating AI, DALL-E 2, was still in the research phase. In July 2022, on Werkhoven's recommendation, Coenen joined a select group of Dutch artists and creative professionals with access to the AI, with the goal of training it through creative experimentation and addressing societal biases. When DALL-E 2 entered beta at the end of July, Coenen made public his first artworks produced with the AI: three series, including a portrait series of Anthropocene children at landfill sites, a series of children with smartphones in mountain mist, and a series of still lifes combining birds, food scraps, flowers, and household waste — all Anthropocene in character and critical of the problem of waste.

== Works ==
=== Oud-West, thuis best (2007) ===
The collection of the Rijksmuseum Amsterdam includes a tile tableau designed by Arno Coenen and executed by Norman Trapman, commissioned by the Paradiso foundation. The tableau, measuring 3 by 6 metres, pays tribute to multicultural society. It combines Moroccan tiles and stars, the cross of Saint Andrew from the coat of arms of Amsterdam, a portrait of William of Orange after Adriaen Thomasz. Key, and two kickboxers.

=== Horn of Plenty (2014) ===
In 2014, Coenen's work Horn of Plenty (Dutch: Hoorn des Overvloeds) attracted international media attention. The piece is a digital image covering 11,000 m² (equivalent to two football pitches) on the inner façade of the new Markthal in Rotterdam. Coenen was selected for the commission from nine international candidates. The artwork consists of 4,000 panels and depicts dramatically enlarged fruits, vegetables, grains, fish, flowers, and insects. Pixar was enlisted to help render the enormous file. According to Coenen, the work is a reference to the "source of life in the cosmos" — a veneration of nature and an ode to the universe. Some publications have described it as "the largest artwork in the world" (a claim that is likely inaccurate) or "the Sistine Chapel of Rotterdam". Coenen realised the work in collaboration with Iris Roskam, Marinus de Ruiter, Michiel van Iperen, Frank aan de Stegge, Dustin Kershaw, and Frank Hanswijk.

=== Selected other works ===
- Deus Ex Machina (1996), video, with René Bosma
- The Last Roadtrip (2000), video
- Time to Bone Remixx (2002), video
- Baghdad Disco (2005), video, with Transformer di Roboter
- Virtual Fairytale 2.0 (2007), street mosaic on the Trumanlaan in Utrecht, featuring figures from video games
- VOC/VIP: Holland Experience! (2007), video, with Peter Leeuwerink
- Eurotrash Brewery (2008), a self-produced beer brand
- Monument René Kempenaar (2009–2011), Weerwaterplein, Almere
- Brothers of Metal (2010), video
- Metal Heart (2010–2012), a series of art events about heavy metal, in collaboration with Marinus de Ruiter and others
- Wapen van Holendrecht, a street tile artwork for the Holendrechtplein in Amsterdam-Zuidoost
- Die 2 Brüder von Venlo (2013), an initially controversial sculpture on a roundabout in Venlo, a gift from supermarket Die 2 Brüder
- Geachte cliënten, 't wordt lente (2014), stained glass window for the Dutch Tax and Customs Administration in Hoofddorp; the title references a lyric by Annie M.G. Schmidt advocating for friendlier language in government communication
- The World is Yours (2015), light artwork on the Tiendplein in the Oude Westen district of Rotterdam, in collaboration with Iris Roskam
- Amsterdam Oersoep (2016), in the Beurspassage, Amsterdam

== Personal life ==
Arno Coenen is the brother of mixed martial arts fighter Marloes Coenen, and the son of cartoonist and draughtsman Huub Coenen.
