= Antisemitenbund =

The Antisemitenbund (German: Der Antisemitenbund, "The Antisemite League") was an Austrian antisemitic collective movement that existed between 1919 and 1938. Their organ was a printed magazine named Der Eiserne Besen ("The Iron Broom").

The movement was founded 1919 in Vienna by Christian Socialist politician Anton Jerzabek. This antisemitic movement was first based in the district of Gersthof (Schindlergasse 20). It was later forced to be moved to Salzburg.

In the beginning of the Austrofascist era, the Antisemitenbund was officially forbidden 1933 by the Ständesstaat, but because it was counted as a NSDAP society, it was allowed to continue its activities. After the German annexation of Austria 1938, the movement dissolved.

Their printed organ Der Eiserne Besen was published from 1919 to 1922 in Vienna, then in Salzburg until 1932. The circulation was small, never exceeding 6 000. The magazine was known for its sensationalist content, with stories focusing on sex scandals involving Jews as well as stories about alleged Jewish ritual murders. Because of its diction and expression, it is seen by many scholars as a predecessor to Der Stürmer.
