= Octatube =

- Industry: Structural engineering
- Founded: 1983 in Delft, Netherlands
- Founder: Mick Eekhout
- Headquarters: Delft
- Number of employees: 100+

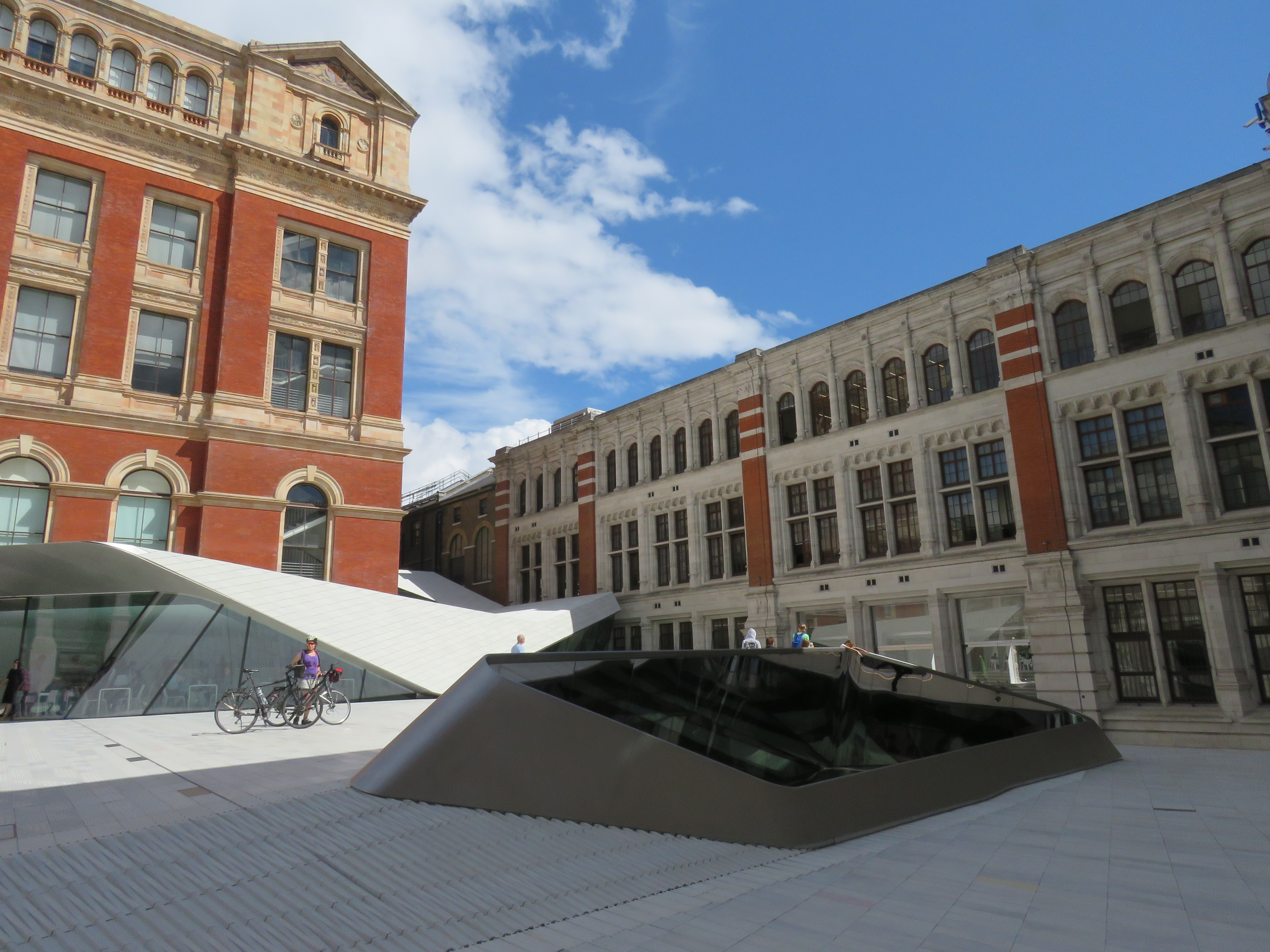
Victoria & Albert Museum, Sackler Courtyard, designed by Amanda Levete Architects (AL_A). Octatube was responsible for the design, engineering, production, and installation of several of the glass and stainless steel structures.

Octatube is a Dutch company that designs, develops and constructs complex architectural structures, with an emphasis on advanced applications of glass and steel. Octatube often assists architectural firms and construction companies to realize challenging architecture. Octatube is based in Delft and unique in the Netherlands, carrying out projects in-house from design to completion.

== History ==
Octatube was founded in 1983 by Mick Eekhout. Octatube was very involved in technical developments in the high-tech architecture era between 1980 and 1995 and in the succeeding freeform or blob architecture period. In the first decade of Octatube's existence, the emphasis was on space frame and tent structures. This developed into the field of structural glazing. Nowadays the company specializes in complex glazed facades, roofs and technically demanding structural forms.

== Major Projects ==
- 2014: all glass roof Gemeentemuseum (municipal museum) in The Hague.
- 2014: The glass façade of the Market Hall in Rotterdam.
- 2015: Glass Entrance, building of the Van Gogh Museum in Amsterdam.
- 2017: complete refurbishment of Sackler Courtyard, entrance to the Victoria and Albert museum in London.
- 2017: London Business School, The Sammy Ofer Centre. Octatube was contracted as a steel and glass specialist.

== Awards ==
- 2015: winner of the Dutch Construction Awards 2015. The cable net facades of the Market Hall, realized by Octatube, were awarded in the category for building materials and systems.
- 2016: Special commendation for Octatube: Facade of the Year, in the category New Build with the glass Entrance Building for the Van Gogh Museum.
- 2017: Winner at the Society of Facade Engineering (SFE) Awards 2017 - Octatube won the Refurbishment category of the Façade of the Year for the new entrance at the Victoria & Albert Museum located in Exhibition Road, West London.
