= Arab League boycott of Israel =

Political strategy of the Arab League

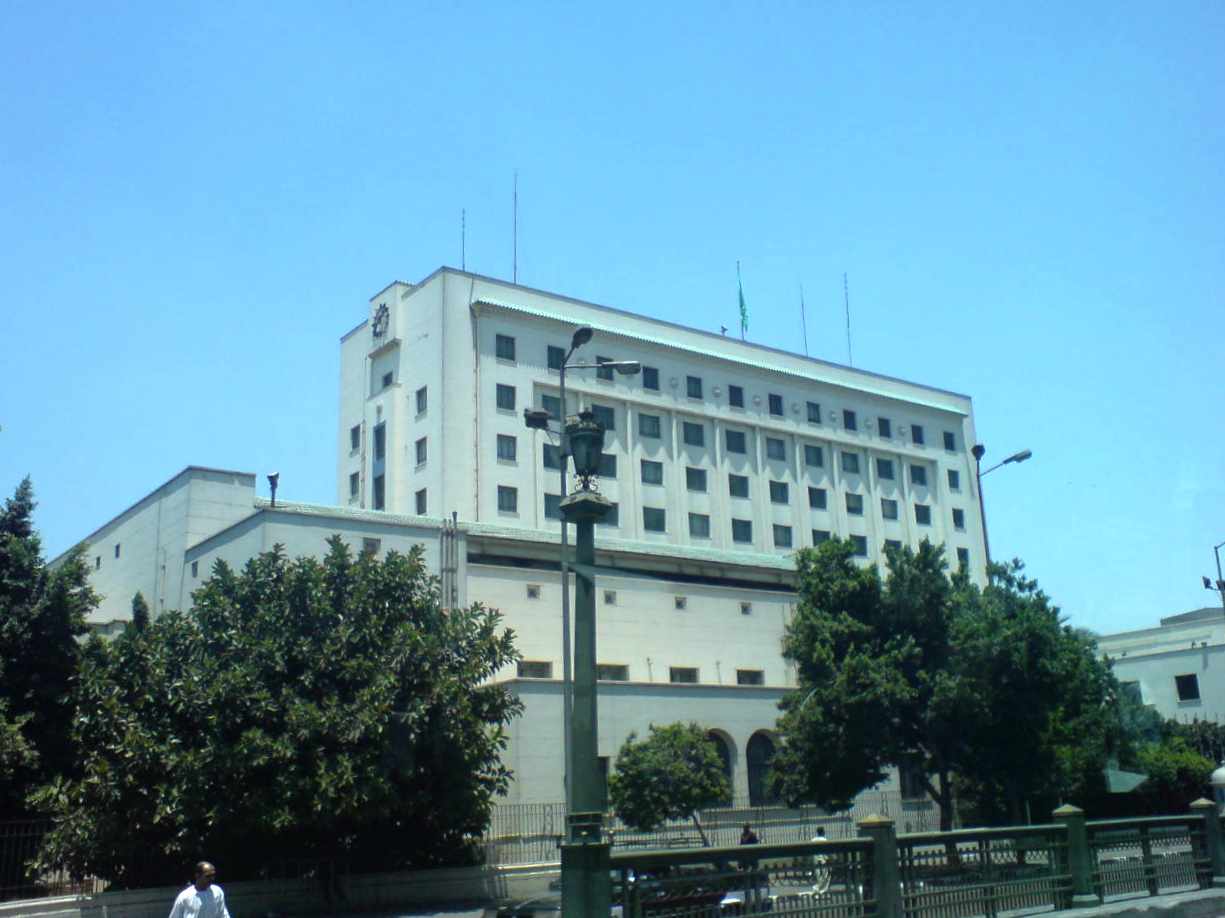
Headquarters of the Arab League, Cairo

The Arab League and its member states have boycotted economic and other relations between Arabs and the Arab states and Israel, stopping all trade with Israel which adds to that country's economic and military strength. A secondary boycott was later imposed, to boycott non-Israeli companies that do business with Israel, and later a tertiary boycott involved the blacklisting of firms that do business with other companies that do business with Israel. An official organized boycott of the Yishuv (pre-state Jewish community in Palestine) was adopted by the Arab League in December 1945, and persisted against Israel after its establishment in 1948. The boycott was designed to weaken Jewish industry in Palestine and to deter Jewish immigration to the region.

Egypt (1979), the Palestinian Authority (1993), Jordan (1994), Bahrain (2020), United Arab Emirates (2020), Sudan (2020) and Morocco (2020), signed peace treaties or agreements that ended their participation in the boycott of Israel. Mauritania, which never applied the boycott, established diplomatic relations with Israel in 1999, later suspended in 2009. Algeria and Tunisia do not enforce the boycott. In 1994, following the Oslo Peace Accords, the Cooperation Council for the Arab States of the Gulf (GCC) states ended their participation in the Arab boycott against Israel. The move prompted a surge of investment in Israel, and resulted in the initiation of joint cooperation projects between Israel and Arab countries. In 1996, the GCC states recognized that total elimination of the boycott is a necessary step for peace and economic development in the region. There are still residual laws banning relations with Israel. For example, until 2021, Sudan had a law, dating back to 1958, that forbade establishing relations with Israel, and outlawed business with citizens of Israel as well as business relationships with Israeli companies or companies with Israeli interests. The law also forbade the direct or indirect import of any Israeli goods.

While, in its heyday, the Arab boycott had a moderate negative impact on Israel's economy and development, it also had significant negative effect on economic welfare in participating Arab countries, as a result of a deterioration in the foreign direct investment climate in the Arab world, and reduction in the volume of trade. In subsequent years and decades, the boycott was sporadically applied and ambiguously enforced, and therefore no longer has a significant effect on the Israeli or Arab economies. As of 2024, Syria and Lebanon are the only Arab states which actively enforce the primary boycott, although Iran (which is not a member of the Arab League) also enforces it as a member of the Organisation of Islamic Cooperation. Syria is the only country to continue to enforce the secondary and tertiary boycotts.

== History ==
=== Boycotts in Mandatory Palestine ===
As part of the Arab opposition to the increasing Jewish presence in Mandatory Palestine, some Arab leaders sought to orchestrate anti-Jewish boycotts from 1922. The original boycott forswore any dealings with any Jewish-owned business operating in Mandatory Palestine. Palestinian Arabs "who were found to have broken the boycott ... were physically attacked by their brethren and their merchandise damaged" when Palestinian Arabs rioted in Jerusalem in 1929. Another, stricter boycott was imposed on Jewish businesses following the riots that called on all of Arabs in the region to abide by its terms. The Arab Executive Committee of the Syrian-Palestinian Congress called for a boycott of Jewish businesses in 1933, and in 1934 the Arab Labor Federation conducted a boycott as well as an organized picketing of Jewish businesses. In 1936, the Palestinian Arab leadership called on another boycott and threatened those who did not respect the boycott with violence. However, this boycott was unsuccessful as Jewish lawyers, physicians, and hospitals were too heavily integrated into Palestinian society.

=== First Arab League boycott ===
On 2 December 1945, the newly formed Arab League, then comprising six members, issued its first call for an economic boycott of the Jewish community of Palestine. The declaration urged all Arab states (not just members) to prohibit the products and usage of the products of Jewish industry in Palestine. The declaration read:

Products of Palestinian Jews are to be considered undesirable in Arab countries. They should be prohibited and refused as long as their production in Palestine might lead to the realization of Zionist political aims.

In 1946, the Arab League established the Permanent Boycott Committee, based in Cairo, Egypt. After the Partition Plan of Palestine into Arab and Jewish states was adopted by the United Nations General Assembly on 29 November 1947, efforts to apply the boycott were intensified. However, the boycott was unsuccessful, as noted in the first annual report of the Boycott Committee, and trade between Palestine (the vast majority by Jews) and Arab states neighboring Palestine continued to thrive.

Following the Israeli declaration of independence on 14 May 1948, the Permanent Boycott Committee ceased to function upon the outbreak of war between Israel and surrounding Arab States on 15 May 1948, and the Arab League repeated its calls for a ban on all financial and commercial transactions with Palestinian Jews, boycotting the newly formed State of Israel. The Arab League cut off postal, telegraphic, and radio communications with Israel, and Arab states imposed a land, sea, and air blockade on the fledgling state.

The Boycott Committee moved to Damascus, Syria in 1949, and called upon Arab states to set up national boycott offices. Later measures adopted by the Committee included requiring those selling goods to Arab states to provide a certificate of origin to prove the goods were not manufactured by Palestinian Jews, the allocation of 50% of the value of goods confiscated in this manner to customs officials, the prohibition by Arabs of the use of Jewish banks, insurance companies, contractors, and transport in Palestine. Member states of the Arab League began implementing these resolutions through legal and administrative measures.

=== Egypt boycott ===
Countries that participated in the Arab League boycott of Israel up to 1987 Full boycott since 1948 Joined full boycott later Only primary boycott Non-member states of Arab League participating in certain years Israel (target of boycott)

Israeli goods, shipped through Alexandria, Port Suez and Port Said, were confiscated by Egyptian inspectors. A prize court established in Alexandria in 1949 authorized the seizure of cargo ships destined for Israel. In 1950, regulations were promulgated to allow the search of ships and aircraft and the seizure of Israeli-bound goods found within.

On 6 February 1950, King Farouk of Egypt issued a decree under which manifests and cargoes of ships could be searched to ensure that no "war contraband" was present on vessels bound directly or indirectly for Israel. War contraband included arms, munitions, and war material. However, article 10 additionally stipulated that other goods were to be considered "contraband" and were to be treated as war material — ships, chemicals, motor vehicles, money, gold, and fuel of any kind. At the time 90% of Israeli oil was supplied by Iran and imported through the Straits of Tiran. To prevent Iranian oil from entering Israel, Egypt blockaded the Straits of Tiran and the Gulf of Aqaba. Oil tankers proceeding through the Suez Canal were required to submit documentation to guarantee none of their cargo would arrive at an Israeli port. To enforce the policy of denying strategic goods to Israel, the decree authorized the use of force against any ship attempting to avoid search, including live gunfire, to make it submit to inspection. If a ship were to subsequently allow a search and reveal that they were not carrying any "contraband", the ship would be allowed to continue its voyage. However, if the ship resisted a search by force, it would be considered to have violated its neutrality. For this "hostile act", ships were to be seized and their cargo impounded even if they were not found to possess any "contraband". Ships found or suspected to transgress the Egyptian shipping practices delineated in this decree were blacklisted by Egypt and denied free use of the Suez Canal. The decree of February 1950 signaled a shift in the policy of the Arab League. The boycott's immediate purpose had originally been to prevent direct Arab trade with Israel (called a primary boycott). With this decree the boycott was expanded to the interruption of international trade with Israel (a secondary boycott). On 8 April 1950, the Arab League Council embraced this shift, approving a decision by its political committee to the effect that all ships carrying goods or immigrants to Israel were to be blacklisted.

In mid-1950, the governments of Britain, Norway, and the United States lodged a complaint with Egypt about some of their tankers being blacklisted and barred from using the Suez Canal. On 1 September 1951, after ships destined for Eilat had been stopped at the entrance of the Gulf of Aqaba, Israel went to the United Nations, demanding Egypt terminate its restrictions on navigation through international waterways in adherence to the 1949 Armistice and to Security Council resolutions prohibiting further hostilities between the Arab states and Israel. The United Nations Security Council issued a resolution which condemned the Egyptian practice as an "abuse of the exercise of the right of visit, search and seizure." The UNSC resolution was ignored by Egypt.

On 28 November 1953, Egypt increased expanded its list of "contraband" to include "foodstuffs and all other commodities likely to strengthen the potential of the Zionists in Palestine in any way whatsoever."

=== Establishment of Central Boycott Office ===
On 19 May 1951, the Arab League Council established the successor to the defunct Permanent Boycott Committee, the Central Boycott Office (CBO), with its headquarters in Damascus, and branch offices established in each Arab League member state. The position of Boycott Commissioner was created to direct the CBO and deputies were appointed, who were to function as liaison officers accredited by each member state of the Arab League. The primary task of the Damascus CBO was to coordinate the boycott with its affiliated offices, and to report regularly to Arab League Council. Biannual meetings were to be held each year after 1951 to coordinate boycott policies and to compile blacklists of individuals and firms which had violated the boycott. Each member state of the Arab League would enforce the resolution through legal and administrative measures. Finally, the resolution stipulated that "participation in regional conferences organized on the initiative of one country or by an international organization could not be attended if Israel were also invited", expanding upon its 1950 decree that such a conference would not be organized by an Arab state.

Boycotts were almost exclusively applied against specific individuals and firms in third countries, and very rarely against the countries themselves, excluding a few short-lived boycotts of countries in the early 1950s. A plan was made by the Arab League in 1952 to boycott the Federal Republic of Germany after it signed the Reparations Agreement with Israel, which would provide Israel with restitution for the slave labor of Jews during the Holocaust and compensate for losses in Jewish livelihood and property that was stolen due to Nazi persecution and genocide. The Arab League strongly opposed the agreement, but its threats to boycott West Germany were never carried out due to economic considerations—the Arab League would be impacted far more negatively by losing trade with West Germany than vice versa. Similarly, at its second meeting on the boycott in 1953, the Arab League proposed a wide range of restrictions on trade with Cyprus, which had become a hub of illicit Arab-Israeli trade. The restrictions were greatly relaxed due to international criticism of the boycott of an entire state not involved in the Arab-Israeli conflict, but they were not eliminated.

The boycott of third parties (secondary boycott) originally applied solely to funds and strategic commodities.

By 1953 the Arab boycott was a well-established feature of international trade relations, and becoming more brazen. In early 1953 the first reports were released about Arab attempts to make American and European airlines boycott Israel by refusing to service Israelis or land in Israel, or at a minimum to not invest in Israel. This tertiary boycott marked another fundamental shift in boycott policy wherein Arab states would pressure third party states to agree to boycott Israel. However, these rudimentary efforts were unsuccessful and the airline boycotts remained isolated to the Arab world.

On 11 December 1954 the Arab League Council passed Resolution 849, approving the Unified Law on the Boycott of Israel. The provisions of this resolution, implemented in legislation by most member states over the following year, formalized the application of the boycott in the Arab States uniformly. The resolution contained new recommendations prohibiting Arab entities and individuals from dealing with agencies of persons working for Israel, and with foreign companies and organizations with interests, agencies, or branches in Israel. The export of Arab goods to countries to be re-exported to Israel was criminalized with a penalty of large fines and hard labor.

=== Further intensification of the boycott and international capitulation to tertiary boycotts ===
In the mid-1950s boycott activities intensified, and gained a new and highly powerful ally — the Soviet Union. During Israel's early years it was seen by the USSR as a potential ally due to the significant socialist aspirations advocated by its founders and applied in its conception. The Soviet Union was one of the first countries to recognize Israel de jure upon its establishment in 1948. However, as Israel's democratic nature became evident and its ties with Western states were solidified, the Soviet Union would view Israel as an enemy in the West vs. East dichotomy of the Cold War. Instead, the Soviet Union would form an alliance with the revolutionary Arab regimes, Egypt, Syria, Yemen, Sudan, and later in the decade Iraq, united in anti-American and anti-Israel political objectives. The clout of the Soviet Union gave the boycott new international legitimacy and guaranteed anti-boycott resolutions a veto at the UN Security Council. The tertiary boycott, formerly ignored as an affront to international trade relations, became enforceable through the sheer political and economic power of the Soviet Union. In 1958, Air France capitulated to Arab League demands after being denied overflight and landing rights in Arab states for eighteen months due to its alleged investment in Israeli development projects.

With the success of the first tertiary boycott the Arab League became increasingly demanding of uninvolved states to adhere to its boycott of Israel. In 1958 the boycott was expanded to prohibit all goods exported from a third state identical to goods imported by the state from Israel, including goods produced with Israeli raw materials or components. In the same year, ships visiting an Arab port and an Israeli port within the same trip were blacklisted.

=== Height of the boycott — the Oil Crisis ===
A man at a service station reads about the gasoline rationing system in an afternoon newspaper; a sign in the background states that no gasoline is available. 1974

The Arab boycott of Israel escalated with the 1973 oil crisis, when the members of the Organization of Arab Petroleum Exporting Countries (OAPEC, consisting of nine Arab members of OPEC plus Egypt and Syria) announced an oil embargo in October 1973, following the American resupply of arms to Israel during the 1973 Yom Kippur War. The OAPEC embargo targeted Canada, Japan, the Netherlands, the United Kingdom and the United States. OAPEC threatened to cut oil production 5% monthly "until the Israeli forces are completely evacuated from all the Arab territories occupied in the June 1967 war...." The embargo lasted for about five months before it was lifted in March 1974, though its aftereffects were to continue.

=== Weakening of the boycott ===
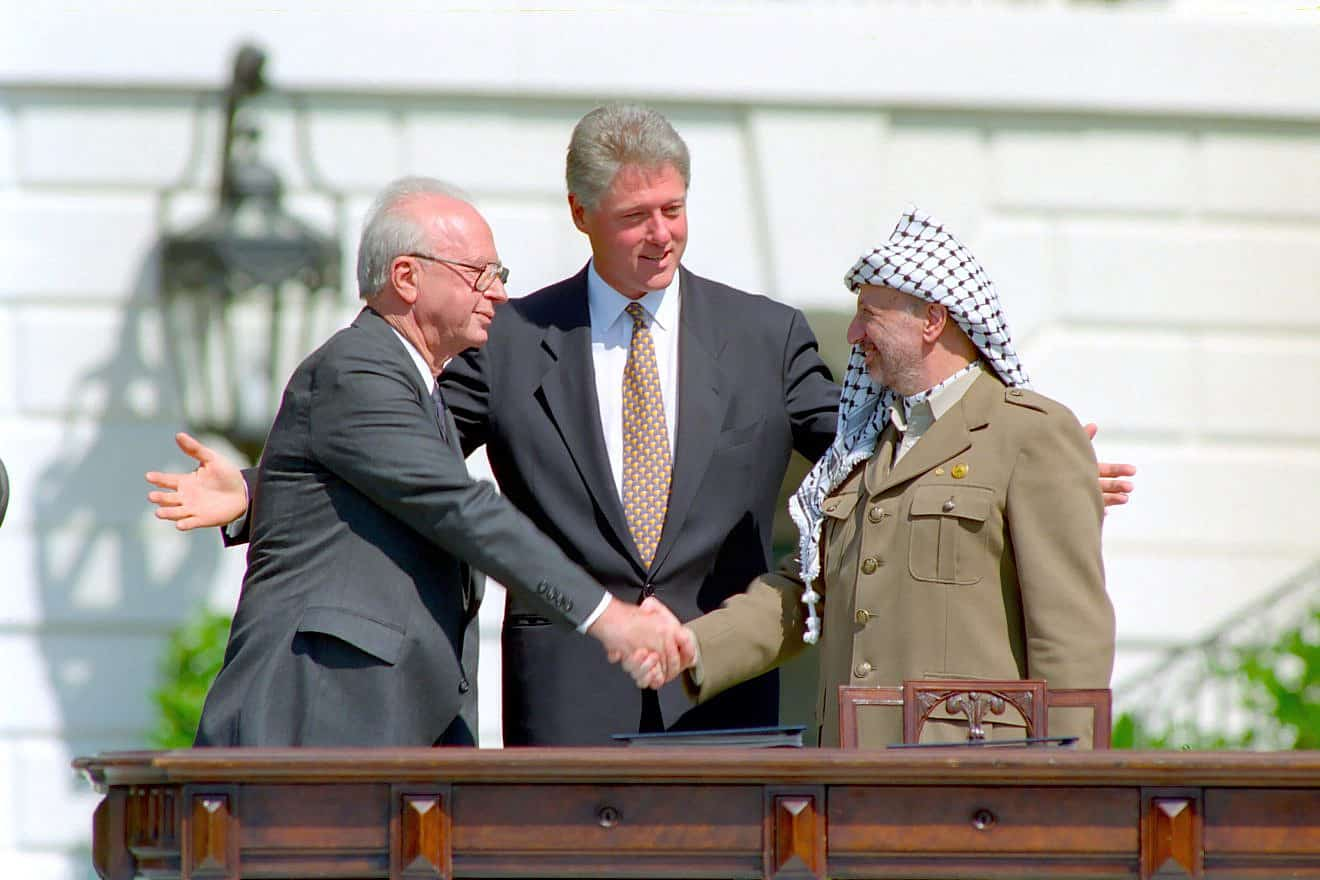
Following the Oslo Peace Accords, the Cooperation Council for the Arab States of the Gulf (GCC) states, ended their participation in the Arab boycott against Israel, and declared that total elimination of the boycott is a necessary step for peace and economic development in the region.

A number of companies found ways of bypassing the boycott and managed to trade with both Israel and the Arab world. For example, some firms that did business with Arab countries officially complied with the boycott, but in practice subcontracted their trade with Israel to companies already blacklisted by the Arab states, while others did business with Israel through divisions or affiliates whose links to the company were disguised. Others strove to cultivate good personal relationships with Arab leaders, who would allow them to trade with Israel without economic repercussions in their own countries as a favor. Some firms placed on the blacklist managed to lobby or buy their way off it.

Israel responded to the boycott by creating its own blacklist of firms that respected the boycott, and circulated them around the world to encourage Jewish-owned businesses to avoid dealing with them. In addition, Israel supporters in some Western countries managed to get anti-boycott laws passed, but they typically went unenforced everywhere except the United States. In 1977 the United States Congress passed a law that President Jimmy Carter signed, which made it a criminal offense to adhere to the boycott and imposed fines on American companies that were found to be complying with it. For the surveillance after the implementation of this law, an office called the "Office of Antiboycott Compliance" was opened in the US Department of Commerce. Despite the fines, there were some American companies (like McDonald's) which preferred to pay the fines and continue boycotting Israel rather than lose their business with the Arab world.

Israel also took a series of steps to evade the embargo and clandestinely trade with the Arab world. Front companies in third countries were set up, which imported goods, then re-exported them to Arab countries with false labels and certificates of origin. In other cases, foreign companies would purchase Israeli technology and materials, use them to assemble completed products, and export them to Arab countries while concealing this fact from their customers. Arrangements with American companies were worked out where the American companies would buy goods from Israeli affiliates and export them as American-made goods. Israeli ships were re-flagged as ships of other nations and provided with faked bills of landing so they could directly export goods to the Arab and Muslim world. Greece and Cyprus were particularly popular hubs for smuggling Israeli goods into the Arab world due to their location, multilateral economic connections, large merchant fleets, and Cyprus' corporate and bank secrecy laws.

Egypt was the first nation to abandon boycott, doing so in 1980 after signing a peace treaty with Israel the previous year. After more or less consistently adhering to the practice of seizing cargo bound for Israel since 1950, the Straits of Tiran and the Gulf of Aqaba were opened to Israeli trade and Israeli cargo went unmolested for the first time in decades. Afterwards, Egypt became a convenient destination to smuggle Israeli goods into the rest of the Arab world, as Israeli goods could be legally imported into Egypt and relabeled as Egyptian for trade with other Arab countries, although the treaty led to other Arab countries becoming more suspicious of Egyptian products. By the late 1980s, Israel's counter-measures against the boycott were proving a success, and the Boycott Office estimated that between $750 million to $1 billion worth of Israeli goods, or about 10% of Israel's exports at the time, were reaching Arab markets per year.

In 1995, a year after it signed a peace treaty with Israel, Jordan lifted its boycott. The Palestinian Authority likewise agreed not to abide by the boycott that same year. In 1994 several of the Arab states of the Persian Gulf abandoned the secondary and tertiary boycotts. The period also saw "low-level diplomatic relations" between Israel and Morocco, Mauritania, Oman, and Qatar. In 1994, following the Oslo Peace Accords, the Cooperation Council for the Arab States of the Gulf (GCC) states, ended their participation in the Arab boycott against Israel. The move prompted a surge of investment in Israel, and resulted in the initiation of joint cooperation projects between Israel and Arab countries. In 1996, the GCC states recognized that total elimination of the boycott is a necessary step for peace and economic development in the region. Algeria, Morocco, and Tunisia do not enforce the boycott. Mauritania, which never applied the boycott, established diplomatic relations with Israel in 1999. Saudi Arabia had pledged to end its economic boycott as a condition for membership in the World Trade Organization but came back on the promise following its acceptance into the organization on December 11, 2005.

As the boycott was relaxed (or rather, not as stringently enforced) starting in the late 1980s and early 1990s, many companies which previously stayed out of the Israeli market had entered it, e.g. McDonald's and Nestlé. In 1985, the ban was lifted on Ford, which had been in place since the company had opened an assembly plant in Israel, and Colgate-Palmolive, although five other companies were added to the blacklist. Toyota began selling cars in Israel in 1991, although it claimed that it had never complied with the boycott, arguing that it did not have the resources to sell cars in the country.

=== Military non-cooperation ===
The Arab League boycott of Israel extends to military and security non-cooperation. For example, before the Gulf War (1990–91) the United States sought to form a military coalition that included Arab countries to confront Saddam Husein’s Iraq following his invasion of Kuwait. During the war, Iraq fired many Scud missiles potentially containing poison gas at Israel, which caused considerable distress and damage in Israel, hoping to provoke an Israeli military response. The Iraqi government hoped that Arab states would withdraw from the coalition, as they would be reluctant to fight alongside Israel. US President Bush pressured Israeli Prime Minister Yitzhak Shamir not to retaliate and withdraw Israeli jets, fearing that if Israel attacked Iraq, the other Arab countries would either desert the coalition or join Iraq. It was also feared that if Israel used Syrian or Jordanian airspace to attack Iraq, they would intervene in the war on Iraq's side or attack Israel.

== Contemporary boycott ==
Today, most Arab states, Syria being the exception, no longer attempt to enforce the secondary or tertiary boycotts. Syria, Lebanon, and Iran (though not an Arab state and not a member of the Arab League) are the only states which actively enforce the primary boycott. The Central Boycott Office has become obsolete. With the vast majority of Arab states benefiting from trade with Israel, any "boycott" has become symbolic in nature, limited to bureaucratic slights such as passport restrictions.

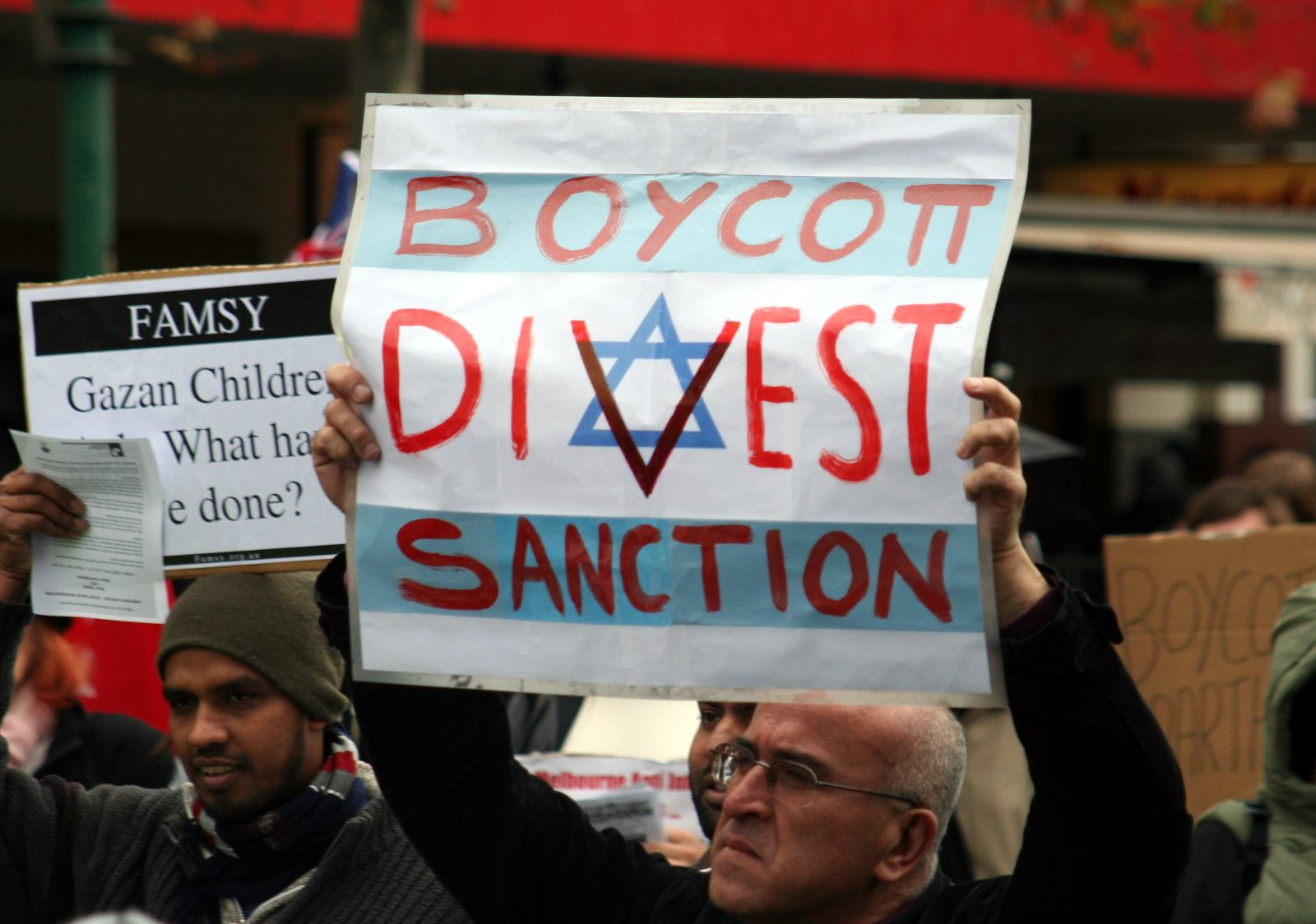
BDS protest in Melbourne, Australia in 2010.

The Boycott, Divestment and Sanctions (BDS) movement was founded in 2005 in an attempt to increase economic and political pressure on Israel and advocates a total, international boycott of Israeli products, divestment of investments in Israel and sanctions. Besides anti-Israel economic measures, the BDS movement also strives to disrupt cultural exchanges and business involving Israel, Israelis and businesses which deal with them. In addition, sporting teams from various Arab states continue to boycott international matches when they are drawn against an Israeli team, choosing instead to forfeit the match.

=== Recognition and diplomatic relations ===
Today, 15 of the 22 members of the Arab League — Algeria, Comoros, Djibouti, Iraq, Kuwait, Lebanon, Libya, Mauritania, Oman, Qatar, Saudi Arabia, Somalia, Syria, Tunisia, and Yemen — do not recognise or have diplomatic relations with Israel; with the exceptions being Bahrain, Egypt, Jordan, Morocco, Palestine, Sudan, and the United Arab Emirates. At Arab League urging, a further 9 members of Organisation of Islamic Cooperation also do not have diplomatic relations with Israel — Afghanistan, Bangladesh, Brunei, Indonesia, Iran, Malaysia, Mali, Niger, and Pakistan. In 2002, the Arab League offered normalisation of relations between Israel and Arab countries as part of the resolution of the Palestine-Israel conflict in the Arab Peace Initiative.

=== Other diplomatic exclusions ===
United Nations members formed themselves into regional groups as a means of sharing the distribution of posts for General Assembly committees. Many UN bodies are allocated on the basis of geographical representation. Top leadership positions, including Secretary-General and President of the General Assembly, are rotated among the regional groups. The groups also coordinate substantive policy and form common fronts for negotiations and bloc voting. Israel is geographically in Asia, but it has been blocked from joining the Asia group by the Arab-Muslim bloc in the group, denying Israel an opportunity to become an active member of UN bodies and positions. In 2000, Israel was admitted as a member of the Western European and Others Group to bypass the Arab-Muslim block. As a consequence, for example, Israel has never been a member of the United Nations Commission on Human Rights.

Another boycott has been applied to Israel's potential participation in the Middle East and North Africa Financial Action Task Force (MENAFATF), a regional body of the Financial Action Task Force on Money Laundering (FATF), instead being an observer in the European regional FAFT style group, Moneyval.

=== Travel restrictions ===
The passports of some countries are not valid for travel to Israel, including Bangladesh, Brunei, Iran, Iraq, and Pakistan. Thirteen countries do not accept Israeli passports: Algeria, Bangladesh, Brunei, Iran, Iraq, Kuwait, Lebanon, Libya, Malaysia, Pakistan, Saudi Arabia, Syria and Yemen. In addition, seven of these countries — Afghanistan, Iran, Kuwait, Lebanon, Libya, Syria and Yemen — do not allow entry to people with evidence of travel to Israel, or whose passports have either a used or an unused Israeli visa. The stamp may be a visa stamp, or a stamp on entry or departure. Because of these issues, Israeli immigration controls do not stamp passports with an entry visa, instead stamping on a separate insert which is discarded on departure. However, a stamp of another country which indicates that the person has entered Israel may frustrate that effort. For example, if an Egyptian departure stamp is used in any passport at the Taba Crossing, that is an indication that the person entered Israel, and a similar situation arises for land crossings into Jordan. Several Arab League member states now accept Israeli passports for transit passengers on flights.

Legend: State of Israel Countries that reject passports from Israel Countries that reject passports from Israel and any other passport which contain Israeli stamps or visas

Countries with restrictions in place
Country	Citizens of Israel	Israeli stamps or any other indication of a connection with Israel
Afghanistan	Admission refused	Admission refused
Algeria	Admission refused	—N/a
Bangladesh	Admission refused	—N/a
Brunei	Admission refused	—N/a
Iran	Admission refused	Admission refused
Iraq (except for Kurdistan Region)	Admission refused	Admission refused
Kuwait	Admission refused	Admission refused
Lebanon	Admission refused	Admission refused
Libya	Admission refused	Admission refused
Malaysia	Admission refused unless holding a letter of approval from the Ministry of Home Affairs	—N/a
Maldives	Admission refused	—N/a
Oman	Admission refused	—N/a
Pakistan	Admission refused	—N/a
Saudi Arabia	Admission refused	—N/a
Syria	Admission refused	Admission refused
Yemen	Admission refused	Admission refused

In August 2020, the United Arab Emirates permitted direct flights to and from Israel, with Saudi Arabia and Bahrain authorizing overflying their territory for such flights. On 8 October 2020, Israel and Jordan reached an agreement to allow flights to cross over both countries’ airspace. It will also allow the UAE and Bahrain, along with other countries in the region, to fly over Israeli airspace.

== Effects of the boycott ==
=== Economic effects ===
Although it cannot be estimated to what extent the boycott hurt Israel's economy, the boycott cannot be said to have affected it to the extent the Arabs intended. Israel's economy has performed relatively well since 1948, achieving a higher GDP per capita than that of all Arab countries except for the oil-rich gulf states of Kuwait and Qatar. The boycott nevertheless has undoubtedly harmed Israel to some extent. The Israeli Chamber of Commerce estimates that with the boycott Israeli exports are 10 percent less than they would be without the boycott and investment in Israel likewise 10 percent lower.

Arab states suffer economically from the boycott as well. In its report on the cost of conflict in the Middle East, Strategic Foresight Group estimates that Arab states lost an opportunity to export $10 billion worth of goods to Israel between 2000 and 2010. Moreover, the Arab states of the Persian Gulf and Iran together stand to lose $30 billion as the opportunity cost of not exporting oil to Israel in the second half of the decade.

Because of the boycott, products that were ubiquitous throughout the First World, such as Pepsi, McDonald's and most Japanese cars were not to be found in Israel until the boycott began waning in the late 1980s. A similar situation existed in the Arab world which boycotted the products of companies that were selling in Israel as in the case of Coca-Cola, Ford and Revlon.

=== Avoiding the boycott ===
Despite the boycott, Israeli goods often do make it onto markets in boycotting Arab countries. The boycott evasion tactic of using a third country as a front to export Israeli goods to the Arab and Muslim world has been used. In addition, Israeli products are not heavily boycotted in the Palestinian territories and often make it into the larger Arab world through the Palestinians or other neutral countries.

=== Foreign reactions to the boycott ===
The United States adopted two anti-boycott laws that seek to counteract the participation of U.S. citizens in other nation's economic boycotts or embargoes (although these laws do not restrict the ability to engage in disinvestment campaigns.) These laws are the 1977 amendments to the Export Administration Act (EAA) and the Ribicoff Amendment to the Tax Reform Act of 1976 (TRA). The antiboycott provisions of the Export Administration Regulations (EAR) apply to all "U.S. persons," defined to include individuals and companies located in the United States and their foreign affiliates, and prohibit them to participate in unsanctioned boycotts against other nations, punishable by fines of up to $50,000 or five times the value of the exports involved or jail term of up to 10 years.

Conduct that may be penalized under the TRA and/or prohibited under the EAR includes:

- Agreements to refuse or actual refusal to do business with or in Israel or with blacklisted companies.
- Agreements to discriminate or actual discrimination against other persons based on race, religion, sex, national origin or nationality.
- Agreements to furnish or actual furnishing of information about business relationships with or in Israel or with blacklisted companies.
- Agreements to furnish or actual furnishing of information about the race, religion, sex, or national origin of another person.

Of all the Western countries, only the United Kingdom has not passed legislation against the Arab boycott. Despite this, many companies in Western nations practice some degree of compliance with the boycott.

Japan was the industrialized nation that complied most with the boycott. As a result, Israel–Japan relations were limited until the 1990s.

=== Notable targets of the blacklist ===
==== People ====
The following is a list of notable people who were at any time blacklisted in the Arab world.

- Marilyn Monroe, for "pronounced pro-Israeli sympathies" and "help[ing] to collect donations for Israel" (also converted to Judaism)
- Elizabeth Taylor, her films were banned after converting to Judaism and purchasing Israeli bonds
- Louis Armstrong, for performing in Israel
- Edward G. Robinson, for "pronounced pro-Israeli sympathies" and "help[ing] to collect donations for Israel" (also Jewish)
- Eartha Kitt, for "pronounced pro-Israeli sympathies" and "help[ing] to collect donations for Israel"
- Frank Sinatra, due to his pro-Jewish and pro-Israel activism
- Harry Belafonte
- Helen Hayes
- Kirk Douglas
- Jerry Lewis
- Paul Newman
- Paul McCartney, for performing in Israel
- Mick Jagger, for performing in Israel
- Elton John, for performing in Israel
- Paul Stewart, for performing in Israel (also Jewish)
- Roger Moore, for performing in Israel
- Paul Simon, for performing in Israel (also Jewish)
- Sophia Loren for filming a movie in Israel, taken off the blacklist when she promised not to be in any more films there.
- Phil Silvers
- Raquel Welch, for purported Israeli nationality, taken off after this was discovered to be false

==== Corporations ====
The following is a list of notable corporations that were at any time blacklisted in the Arab world.

- RCA
- Zenith
- Coca-Cola
- Barclays Bank
- McDonnell Douglas
- Bantam Books
- Sears Roebuck
- Revlon
- Ford Motor Company
- General Electric
- Hewlett Packard
- Hughes Aircraft
- Hilton
- Mercedes-Benz
- Avis
- IBM
- Citibank
- Nestlé
- Raytheon, for supplying Hawk anti-aircraft missile systems to Israel in the 1970s
- Marks & Spencer (until 2007)

==== Films ====
The following is a list of notable films that were at any time blacklisted in the Arab world.

- I Love You, Alice B. Toklas (1968), filmed in Israel
- The Big Red One (1980), filmed in Israel
- Delta Force (1986), filmed in Israel
- Wonder Woman (2017); the title star, Gal Gadot, is Israeli and previously undertook mandatory service in the Israel Defense Forces.

== See also ==
- Boycotts of Israel
- Boycott, Divestment and Sanctions
