= The Book of Names =

Oversized commemoration book of Holocaust victims

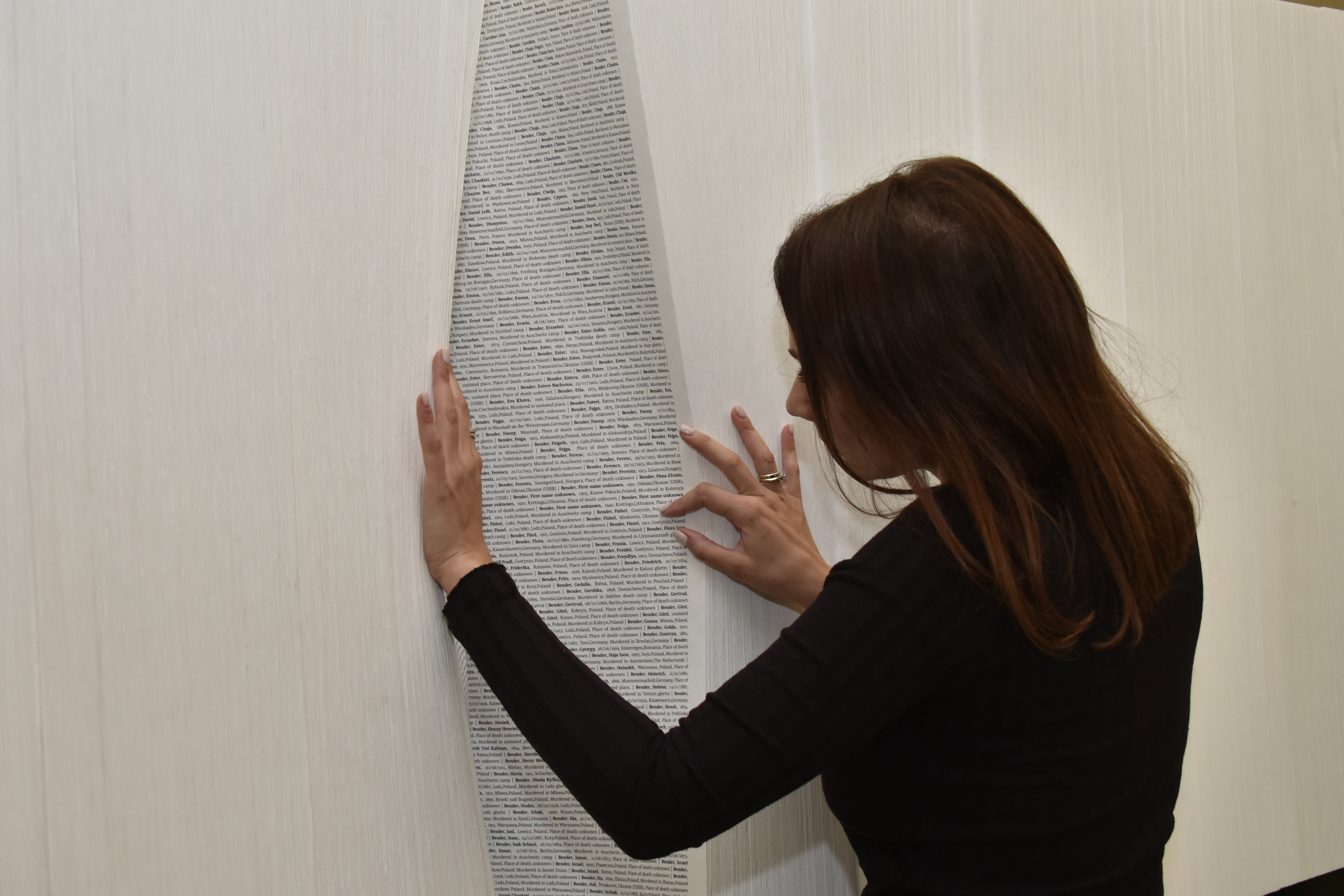
The Book of Names at Yad Vashem

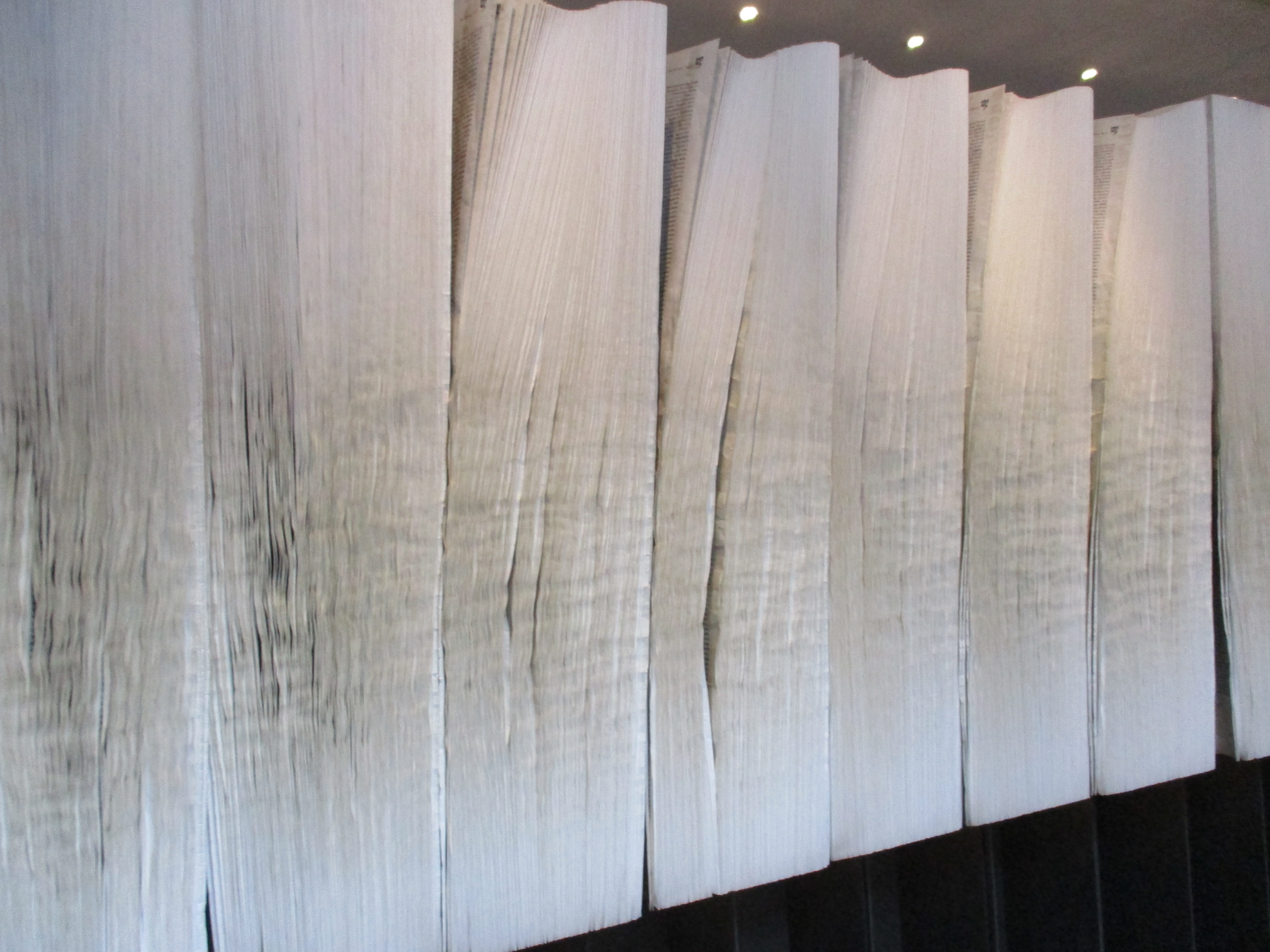
The Book of Names in Auschwitz

The Book of Names is a large-scale commemoration book, whose pages detail the names and short biographical information about approximately 4,800,000 Jewish victims of the Holocaust known to and documented by Yad Vashem, out of a total of 5.8 million victims. The book was printed in two editions, in 2013, and a decade later.

== Initiative ==
The idea to establish the Book of Names stemmed from people coming to the Hall of Names at Yad Vashem and wanting to physically touch the Pages of Testimony, to embody the commemoration - which was not possible since the pages are archival sources under preservation. The source and inspiration for the mode of commemoration in the Book of Names are European synagogues like the Pinkas Synagogue in the Jewish Museum in Prague, where tens of thousands of names of Holocaust victims are inscribed on the walls. The accessibility of the names, in an unmediated way, inspired the Book of Names, in which one can touch each and every name of the Holocaust victims.

== The Names Database ==
As part of the "Every Person Has a Name" commemoration project, the names of the many Holocaust victims about whom information reached Yad Vashem were collected, usually following testimony gathered from survivors via Pages of Testimony. The names database is available on site and online, but unlike the digital database, the Book of Names is a monumental physical monument commemorating the victims in a tangible way. It emphasizes their quantity alongside their individuality by dispelling the anonymity of each name and briefly focusing on the life journey of the person who bore it, separately from the whole for a fleeting moment.

== The Book ==
In 2013, the book was printed in a single copy containing around 4,300,000 names. It is displayed in a permanent exhibition in Block 27 at the Auschwitz-Birkenau State Museum, at the final station.

In 2023, the book was re-issued in an updated version containing approximately 4,800,000 names. On January 26, on the eve of the International Holocaust Remembrance Day, it was exhibited at the United Nations headquarters, attended by Secretary-General Antonio Guterres, Israeli Ambassador Gilad Erdan, and Chairman of the Yad Vashem Council Danny Dayan. The exhibition was displayed for several weeks until February 17. In March, it was transferred to Israel, and on the eve of Holocaust Remembrance Day 5783, it was placed on permanent display at the Yad Vashem Holocaust History Museum, in the presence of President Isaac Herzog.

The names appear in English alphabetical order. Next to them are details of date and place of birth, and place of murder, as known. The book's pages are tall and rigid, 30 cm wide and 1 meter high. The 20,000 pages are bound into 70 volumes of about 80,000 names each. The volumes are arranged along 8 meters on both sides of a black stand, illuminated from below. On the front of the stand is the name of the book and its purpose. At Yad Vashem, it is accessible for reading in a permanent hall with wooden benches placed along its walls, away from the book's two ends.

== See also ==
- Every Person Has a Name
- Ohel Yizkor

== External ==
- Official website
- An online exhibition on The Book of Names, on Yad Vashem website
- "Category:The Book of Names - Wikimedia Commons". commons.wikimedia.org.
