= Every Person Has a Name =

Holocaust commemoration project

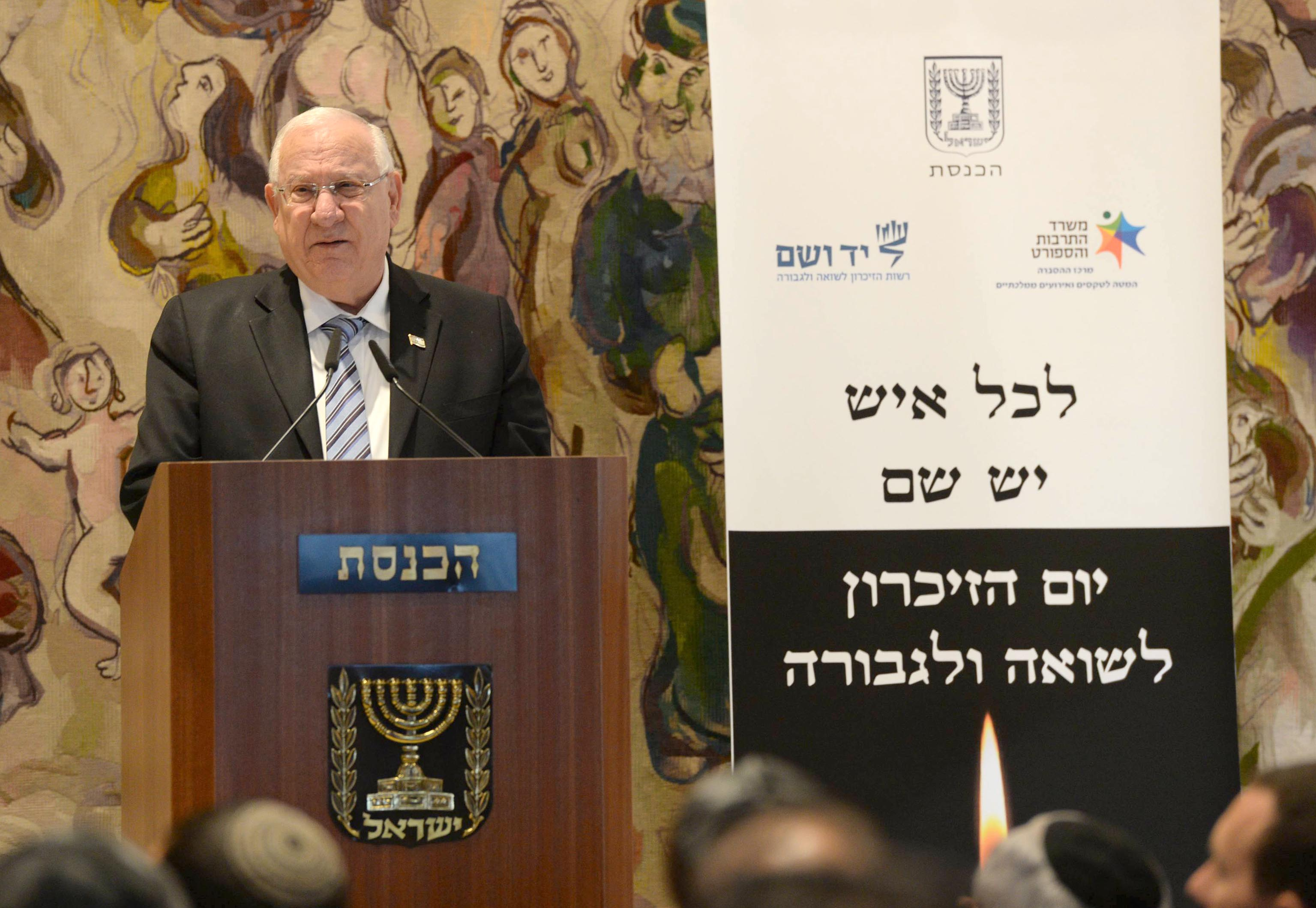
Everyone Has a Name - Knesset ceremony

Every Person Has a Name or Everyone Has a Name (לכל איש יש שם) is Yad Vashem's commemoration project to document the names of those killed in the Holocaust. The project's goal is to commemorate the victims individually, ensuring that at the very least the names of the millions of Jews murdered in the Holocaust are recorded. The project's name is taken from the poem by Zelda, "Every Person Has a Name".

== The Names Recovery Project ==
As part of the commemoration project, Yad Vashem is collecting the names of all Holocaust victims that have reached the museum, usually by gathering testimony from survivors through Pages of Testimony. The names database is available on-site and also online. The project serves as a valuable tool for researching the genealogy of victims' families. The collection of Pages of Testimony began in mid-1955, and by the end of 1956, 500,000 pages containing the names of about 750,000 murdered individuals had been collected. As of 2010, 4 million names had been documented, representing about two-thirds of the Holocaust victims, with approximately 55% of the names coming from Pages of Testimony and the rest from archival documents and various commemoration initiatives.

== The Names Book ==
The Names Book is a large commemorative book listing the names and brief details about some 4,800,000 Jewish victims of the Holocaust known to Yad Vashem and documented through the Names Recovery Project, out of the total 6 million victims. The book has been published in two editions, in 2004 and a decade later.

== The "Every Person Has a Name" Ceremony ==
=== Origin of the Idea ===
In 1989, Holocaust survivor from the Netherlands Chaim Roth and the Second Generation organization of children of Holocaust survivors headed by Billy Leniado (based on an idea by a Dutch newspaper correspondent in Israel, Ed Rosenthal) organized a demonstration in front of the Dutch Embassy in Tel Aviv to protest the release of Nazi criminals from prison in the Netherlands. The thousand participants, including many Holocaust survivors, spent hours reading out the names of Dutch Holocaust victims. The demonstration and the participants' reactions to the name-reading led initiator Chaim Roth, together with Billy Leniado, to launch the "Every Person Has a Name" commemoration project to honor the memory of the victims as unique individuals rather than an incomprehensible number. The project was later embraced by Yad Vashem which now heads it, and as part of it, the names of hundreds of thousands of victims are read out each year in Israel and around the world.

=== The Ceremony ===
On Holocaust Remembrance Day, since 1989, the "Every Person Has a Name" ceremony has taken place at Yad Vashem's Tent of Remembrance, the Knesset, and various locations across Israel and worldwide. During the ceremony, the names of victims documented by Yad Vashem over the years are read aloud by Knesset members, youth movement members, and families of survivors.

The then-Speaker of the Knesset, Dov Shilanski, himself a Holocaust survivor, adopted the project from its inception, and since then, a national commemoration ceremony as part of the project has been held at the Knesset on Holocaust Remembrance Day. The national ceremony, organized jointly with Yad Vashem and the National Information Center, takes place on Holocaust Remembrance Day itself at 11:00 AM, after the wreath-laying ceremony at Yad Vashem. Participants include the Speaker of the Knesset, the President of Israel, the Prime Minister, the Chief Rabbis, government ministers, members of Knesset, Yad Vashem directors, youth movement members, soldiers, representatives of immigrant associations, delegations from abroad, and others.

The ceremony's core is the reading of the names of individuals who perished in the Holocaust, including family members, acquaintances, and friends of the participants. Six representatives – Holocaust survivors and second- and third-generation descendants of survivors – light memorial candles. One of the Chief Rabbis recites a chapter of Psalms while the other says the Kaddish memorial prayer for the victims' souls, and an IDF cantor recites the El Maleh Rachamim memorial prayer. Choir passages are incorporated into the ceremony. Similar ceremonies take place across the world during Holocaust Remembrance Day.

== See also ==
- The Book of Names
- Ohel Yizkor
