= Yad Vashem: Preserving the Past to Ensure the Future =

1989 American documentary film

- Produced by: Ray Errol Fox
- Distributed by: Ergo Media
- Release date: 1989
- Country: United States
- Language: English

Yad Vashem: Preserving the Past to Ensure the Future is a 1989 American short documentary film produced by Ray Errol Fox about Yad Vashem, the Israel's Holocaust memorial authority. It was nominated for an Academy Award for Best Documentary Short.

== See also ==
- Gathering the Fragments
