= Ohel Yizkor =

- אוהל יזכור
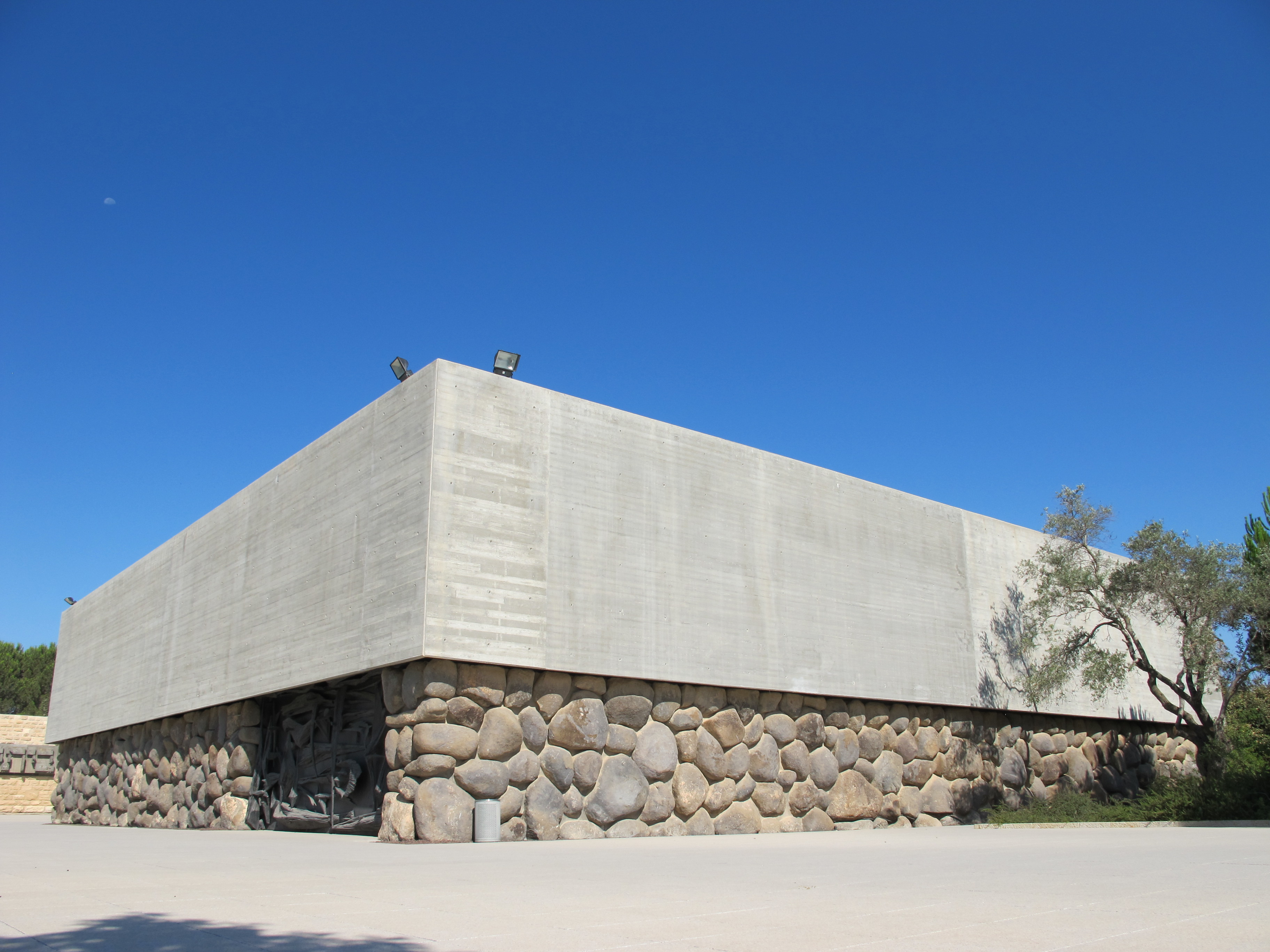
- Interactive map of the Ohel Yizkor area

Ohel Yizkor is the central gathering structure and the ceremony hall of the Yad Vashem Holocaust Remembrance Authority in Jerusalem. In the building, the national memorial ceremonies in memory of the Holocaust victims are held, and it is customary for official guests of the State of Israel to visit and lay wreaths in memory of the victims.

== Establishment ==
The Ohel Yizkor structure was designed by architects Aryeh El-Hanani, Aryeh Sharon, and Benjamin Idelson, inspired by the memorial site structure for the massacre in Fosse Ardeatine. The building was constructed in 1957 with the purpose of serving as a ceremony hall for the memorial site.

== Architecture and fittings ==
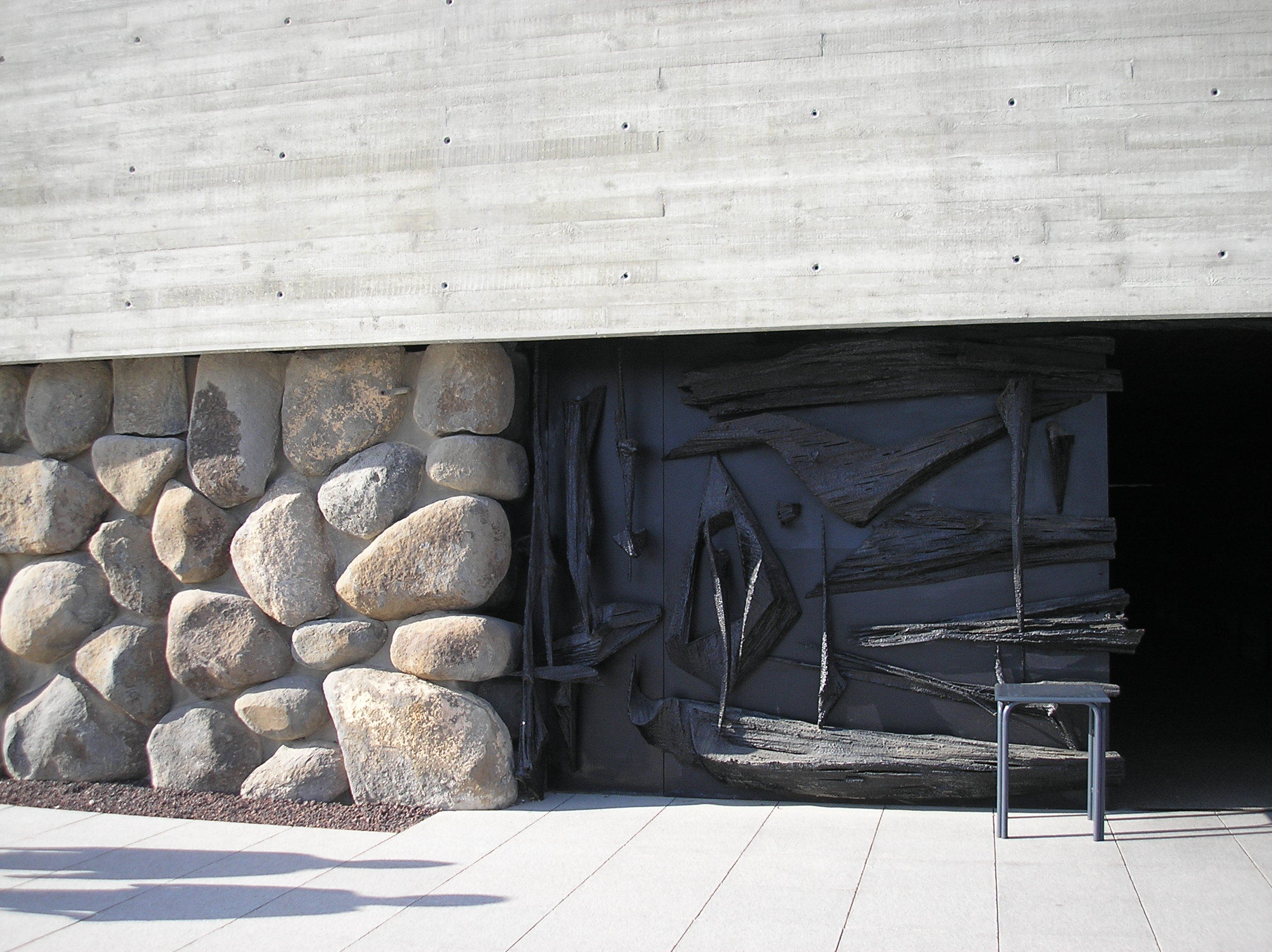
Entrance gates to the Ohel Yizkor

The structure is square-shaped. Its walls are built of roughly hewn basalt stones of various sizes, brought from the Beit She'an Valley. This is since the construction was in 1961 when the Golan Heights were still in Syrian hands.

Its roof is made of exposed concrete, whose inner side is pyramid-shaped. The apex of the pyramid is located above the eternal flame burning within the structure. The roof does not touch the building's walls and is supported by thin, almost invisible steel columns, since the building is not illuminated, the only light entering the building comes through the slit between the roof and the building's walls.

The building's doors were designed by the sculptor David Plombo (who later designed the Palombo Gates at the entrance to the Knesset building) in the shape of smokestacks. Visitors do not walk on the building's floor but pass along its length on a concrete bridge. Engraved on the floor of the building are the names of concentration and extermination camps in Europe, names of ghettos and killing pits.

In total, 22 names of concentration and extermination camps as well as major extermination and murder sites that were prominent in research at that time are marked. For example, the name Breendonk is written following the testimony of Jean Améry that was found. The names of the places are engraved in white lettering reliefs above the black floor, designed by the typographer and calligrapher Yerachmiel Schechter. Beneath the black marble stone in the center of the hall, ashes brought from extermination and concentration camps are buried. The ashes were buried outside, on the mountain slopes, in the fifties, and in 1961 were transferred to Ohel Yizkor with its inauguration. With the inauguration of the tent, the Military Rabbinate buried it, since 'the Chief Rabbinate was working with the Holocaust cellar and was not in contact on this matter with Yad Vashem in those years.'

=== Names of the Places in Ohel Yizkor ===
The names of the places in Ohel Yizkor, as they are written in the transliteration that was customary in the sixties:

| In Hebrew | In Foreign Language |
|---|---|
| ראוונסברוק | RAVENSBRUEK |
| וסטרבורק | WESTERBORK |
| באבי יאר | BABI-YAR |
| פונאר | PONAR |
| ברינדונק | BREENDONCK |
| טראנסניסטריה | TRANSNISTRIA |
| בוכנוואלד | BUCHENWALD |
| טרבלינקא | TREBLINKA |
| סוביבור | SOBIBOR |
| קלוגא | KLOOGA |
| יאסנובאץ | JASENOVAC |
| מאוטהאוזן | MAUTHAUSEN |
| שטוטהוף | STUTTHOF |
| תרזיינשטאט-טרזין | THERESIENSTADT-TEREZIN |
| אושוויץ-אושווינצ'ים | AUSCHWITZ-OSWIEĆIM |
| מאידאנק | MAJDANEK |
| דכאו | DACHAU |
| ברגן-בלזן | BERGEN-BELSEN |
| בלזץ | BEŁZEC |
| חלמנו | CHEŁMNO |
| לבוב-יאנובסקא | LWOW-JANOWSKA |
| דראנסי | DRANCY |

Total – 22 names. The structure is built in the shape of a pyramid to symbolize eternal remembrance, and the structure is also meant to recall the Tent of Meeting (hence its name: Ohel Yizkor).

== See also ==
- Every Person Has a Name
- The Book of Names
