= Alona Frankel =

Polish-born Israeli writer and illustrator (born 1937)

- אלונה פרנקל
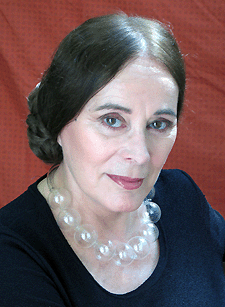
- Writer & Illustrator Alona Frankel
- Born: 27 June 1937 (age 89); Kraków, Poland
- Occupations: Illustrator, writer, novelist
- Spouse: Zygmunt Frankel (1937-1997)
- Children: Ari Frankel (b. 1960), Michael Frankel (b. 1972)
- Writing career
- Notable works: Once Upon a Potty, Once Upon an Elephant, A Family of Tiny White Elephants (or: Once Upon an Elephant), A True Story (or: Once Upon a Bird), A Book Full of Love, Girl, Teen, Woman

Alona Frankel (Hebrew: אלונה פרנקל; 27 June 1937) is a Polish-born Israeli writer and illustrator of many classic children's books as well as recently published poetic memoirs for young adults. She was born in Kraków, Poland, and is a Holocaust survivor. In 1949, Alona immigrated to Israel.

== Biography ==
Alona Frankel was born in 1937 in Kraków, Poland, and spent her childhood during the Holocaust in the Lwów Ghetto, then in hiding; first alone, later with her parents. After immigrating to Israel with her family in 1949, Frankel studied art at the Avni Institute. She began illustrating children's books at the age of 30. In 1975, she published the first of over 40 children's books that she both wrote and illustrated, in addition to illustrating dozens of books by other authors. Her books, translated into 12 languages, have become bestsellers. She lectures on illustration at several institutions, and her work has been featured at exhibitions and fairs in Israel and abroad. Frankel has won numerous prizes, including an Hans Cristian Andersen Honor Citation and multiple Parent's Choice awards. Girl, her first book for adults, was awarded the Sapir Prize for Literature and Yad Vashem's Buchman award. She was married to the late artist Zygmunt Frankel (1929-1997; see http://www.zygmuntfrankel.com), and their sons are Ari (born 1960; see http://www.arifrankel.com), and Michael (born 1972).

== Author and illustrator of children's literature ==
For all ages

Frankel started writing when her son Michael was a baby, creating a book for him about toilet training, titled Sir ha-Sirim (Hebrew: Potty of Potties; a whimsical play on words from the biblical Hebrew Shir ha-Shirim, Song of Songs). The Hebrew-language original was published in 1975 and became an instant best seller. Frankel gained international popularity and recognition when its English translation, Once Upon a Potty, appeared in 1980 for boys – Joshua – and girls – Prudence. These books and their video editions have sold over 5,000,000 copies in the United States alone. They were listed as No. 1 (His) and No. 3 (Hers) in Publishers Weekly all-time best-selling Hardcover Childcare charts. Alona Frankel has written and illustrated several dozen children's books, many of which have been translated into English and other languages. Her books have been published by Harper Collins, Firefly Books, and Publications International.

For adults

Following the Hebrew publication of Girl [Hebrew: Yalda], its translation into Polish and Czech, and excellent reviews, comparing it favorably to Anne Frank and Primo Levi writings, Alona published two more volumes in her autobiographical memoir, Teen and Woman. Indiana University Press published Girl in English in Fall 2016.

== Awards ==
Following numerous awards and honors for her picture book works, in 2005, Frankel won Israel's Sapir Prize for Literature for her memoir, Girl, about her childhood and the Second World War in Poland, spent under an assumed identity or in hiding. The book was also awarded the Jacob Buchman Memorial Foundation Prize for Holocaust Literature that same year. In 2014, Frankel was a recipient of the Prime Minister's Prize for Hebrew Literary Works.
