= Hall of Names =

Archive of Holocaust victims

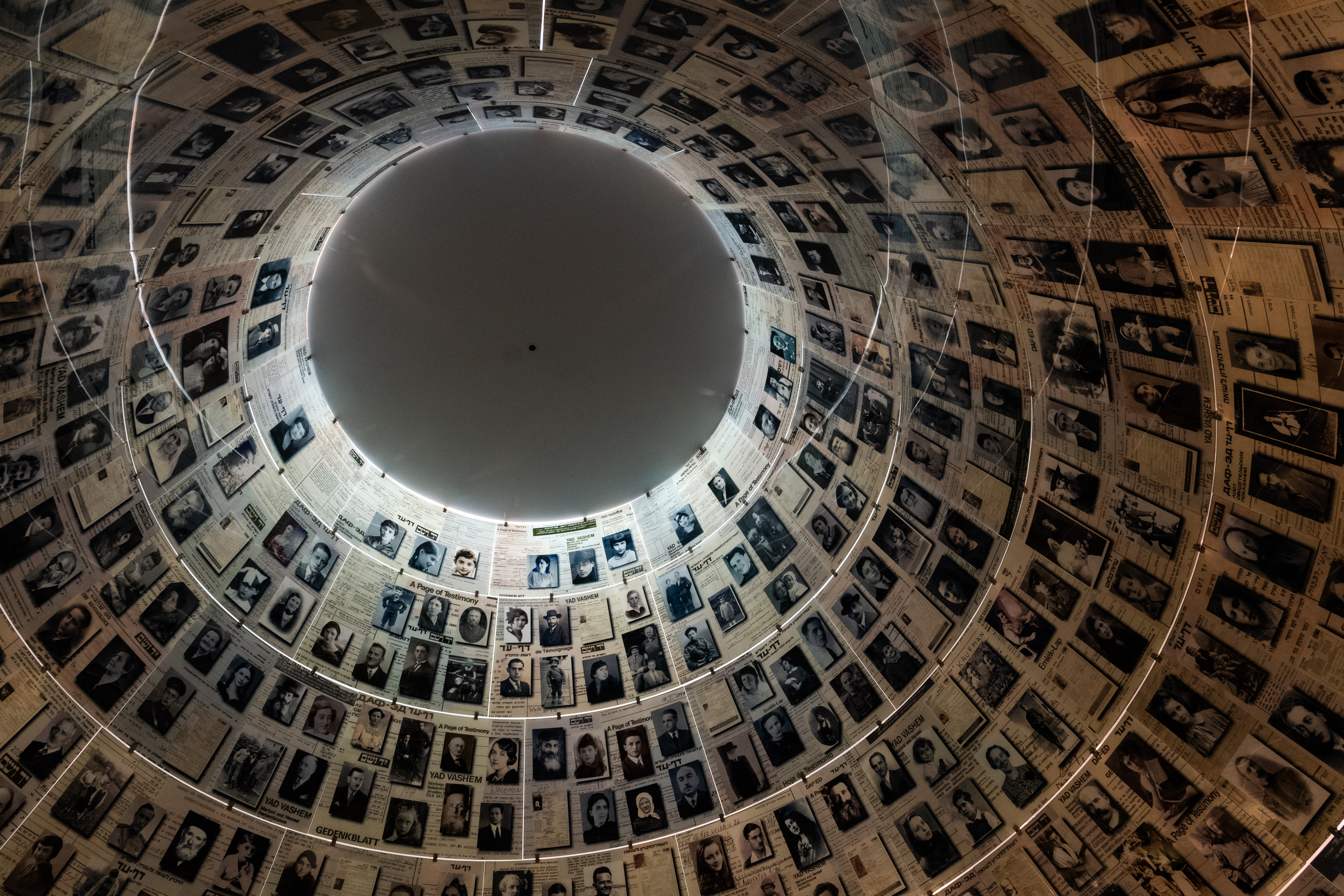
- Interactive map of Hall of Names

General information
- Type: Museum, Memorial
- Location: Jerusalem, Israel
- Coordinates: 31°46′28″N 35°10′30″E
- Opened: 1977; 49 years ago
- Owner: Yad Vashem

The Hall of Names is a repository for the names of millions of Holocaust victims at Yad Vashem, the Holocaust Remembrance Authority in Jerusalem. These names also appear in the Central Database of Shoah Victims' Names on the Yad Vashem website. Most of the names are commemorated on Pages of Testimony, with the rest gleaned from Holocaust-era lists, such as those of ghetto and concentration camp prisoners, Jews whose property was confiscated by Nazi Germany and its allies, Jews deported on transports, victims of death marches, etc.

== History ==
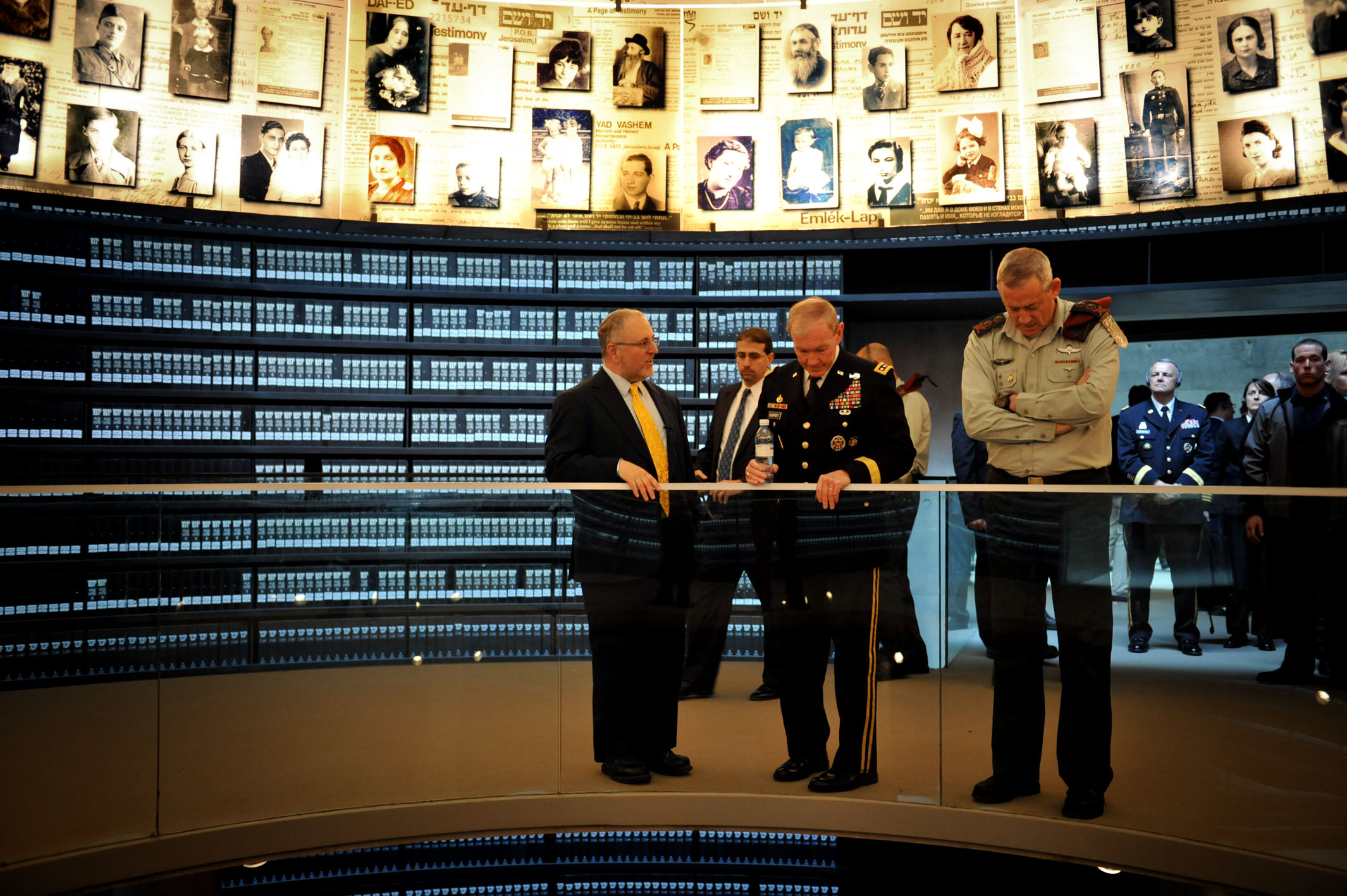
The Chairman of the Joint Chiefs of Staff of the United States Military, General Martin E. Dempsey at the Hall of Names

In 1968, a "Names Room" was established at Yad Vashem in Jerusalem, in which original Pages of Testimony were stored in alphabetical order. In 1977, the Hall of Names building was opened at Yad Vashem. In the 1980s, Yad Vashem copied onto microfilm some one million Pages of Testimony in order to improve their accessibility to the general public as well as to provide backup for the Pages. With the beginning of the large wave of immigration of Jews from the Former Soviet Union in the 1990s, the rate at which Pages of Testimony were submitted doubled to some 3,000 per month. In 1990, Yad Vashem began to glean names of Holocaust victims from deportation lists as well as camp and ghetto prisoner records, prepared by the Nazis and their allies. The 1990s also saw the launch of the project to digitize the names of Holocaust victims found in the Hall of Names. During the Names Recovery Campaign in 1999 under the auspices of Israeli President Ezer Weizman, 380,000 Pages of Testimony were submitted in one year alone, and another 70,000 in the year 2000. That same year, a digitized database of Holocaust victims' names was created, and in 2004 the Central Database of Holocaust Victims' Names was launched on the Yad Vashem website.

With the dedication of the new Holocaust History Museum at Yad Vashem in 2005, the Hall of Names was moved to that location. As of 2024, more than 4.9 million names of Holocaust victims are stored in the Hall of Names.

== Structure ==
The Hall of Names consists of a circular upper walkway for visitors. The space above and below the walkway is constructed of two 10-meter cones facing away from each other and connected at their widest point. The upper cone bears copies of some 600 photographs and fragments of Pages of Testimony of Holocaust victims. The downward facing cone reaches into the mountain bedrock, at the base of which a pool of water reflects the images in the upper cone. Opposite to the entrance of the Hall of Names is an opening leading to a computer center for searching for names of Holocaust victims. On the walls surrounding the walkway are shelves bearing files in which the original Pages of Testimony are stored. These Pages are not accessible to the general public, but may be viewed in the computer center or online at the Central Database of Shoah Victims' Names on the Yad Vashem website.

== See also ==
- The Central Data Base of Shoah Victims' Names
