= Ray Errol Fox =

American journalist

- Born: Ramon Errol Fox; July 13, 1939; Philadelphia, Pennsylvania, U.S.
- Genres: Musical theatre, film, newspaper, magazine, blog
- Occupations: Writer, lyricist, journalist, documentarian, reviewer
- Years active: 1965–present

Ray Errol Fox is an American journalist who has written and produced award-winning documentaries, written books, and composed.

Ray Errol Fox's novel career in journalism and the arts has resulted in a wide range of distinguished achievements. His film, Preserving the Past to Ensure the Future, which he wrote and produced, was nominated for an Academy Award for Best Short Subjects Documentary in 1990. "Freedom to Hate," a one-hour film narrated by Dan Rather and introduced by Jack Lemmon that Fox directed as well, was selected an Outstanding Documentary of the Year by the Motion Picture Academy Foundation, awarded the CINE Golden Eagle and the American Film and Video Association's Blue Ribbon, was presented by the Congressional Human Rights Caucus to members and staff of the U.S. Congress, and has been widely used by emigration lawyers to protect political refugees from deportation and harm.

His book, "Angela Ambrosia", published by Knopf, was a Literary Guild Selection, Pocket Books paperback, Xerox Education edition, Look Magazine feature and a newspaper supplement. A recognized specialist in Middle East analysis, he contributed to The New York Times, Los Angeles Times, Boston Globe, Huffington Post, The Observer and numerous other publications. His New York Times article on Lebanon's Major Sa'ad Haddad was read into the U.S. Congressional Record.

Fox has appeared on The Today Show, CNN, others - and before a U.S. congressional committee re: hate crimes in Russia. He contributed two films, narrated by Larry King, to an International Satellite Broadcast hosted by King—and co-directed a documentary featuring the Dalai Lama in Mongolia. His additional documentary credits include: writer of "The Other War," featuring Eli Wallach and Anne Jackson; writer and producer of "Sammy Davis: Mission of Love"; and writer-producer-director of "Echoes of Remembrance", featuring a uniquely emotional Robert Maxwell and "Forward with New York" for the New York Daily News.

Fox was the co-teleplay writer and executive producer of "Family Dr.", a CBS TV film (2003) and wrote "Under Pegasus," a feature film in development based on the book by David Beckman. Prior to these, he wrote a screenplay (Miramax) based on the life of Moe Berg and contributed 'Additional Material' to two films, Hotshot and "The Stranger."

He has served as a theater, film and dance critic (Spectrum, New Republic et al. and on radio) - and contributed cultural and entertainment articles to countless newspapers and magazines. His exclusive account of a trip accompanying Elizabeth Taylor to Israel was a cover feature in "The Ladies' Home Journal"; "The Other Side of Goldie Hawn" was a cover story for "Parade"; and a 'reminiscence' with Sammy Davis Jr. appeared in a New York Times Sunday supplement. An exclusive interview with Armand Hammer was featured in "Aretè" and a cover story featuring Goldie Hawn, Kurt Russell and Sherry Lansing accompanied the premier issue of "Dimension."

Fox, who began his professional writing career as a lyricist, provided the lyrics for motion picture title themes including Resnais' award-winning "The War Is Over" and Fellini's "The Clowns." For theater, he wrote the lyrics for the Broadway production of Lorraine Hansberry's "The Sign in Sidney Brustein's Window": the Theatreworks and Pittsburgh Civic Light Opera productions of "Young Ben Franklin"; and contributed material to "Upstairs at the Downstairs," "Broadway Jukebox" and numerous other shows and reviews.

One of his most popular works is "The Confidence Man", a musical based on the Herman Melville novel of the same name. Ray Fox wrote the book and lyrics and Jim Steinman wrote the music. It was originally performed as a cabaret piece at the Manhattan Theater Club. A full staging, presented as a World Premier, followed at the Queens College Theatre. It was performed again in 2004 in Cincinnati, OH by the Beechmont Players, Inc. with an updated script and score.

Fox has also been responsible for several signature themes, including "Here's to Love" (Shields & Yarnell, CBS TV) and wrote "Children to Children" (lyric) for the 150 young professionals of the Children to Children's Chorus (debuted at the Live Aid Concert). His song lyrics endure on many recordings.

He wrote the play, "Spy-Catcher/The Unbelievably True Story of Moe Berg".
