= Once Upon a Potty =

Picture book for young children by Israeli author Alona Frankel

Once Upon a Potty (Hebrew: סִיר הַסִירים) is a picture book by Alona Frankel for pre-schoolers and their families, aimed to help with their potty learning. Its original version was published in 1975 in Hebrew and only featured the boy Joshua (נַפְתָּלִי). The English-language version was published in 1980 along with the girl Prudence (צִיּוֹנָה). The books have been translated into multiple languages, including Japanese, Chinese, Korean, Dutch, Italian, Spanish, and Hungarian. The English editions have sold more than 7 million copies in North America alone. There were also animated VHS, DVD, audio CD and audio tape versions produced. The books are still in print in both hardcover and board editions, and Oceanhouse Media has produced mobile app versions on all digital platforms.

The book contains a story, told from the point of view of a mother of a toddler who tries to figure out how to use a potty gifted to them by their grandmother. The story first describes that toddler's body, he or she has a head for thinking, eyes for seeing, ears for hearing, a mouth to talk and eat with, hands for playing, a “pee-pee” for making “wee-wee”, legs for walking and running, a bottom for sitting, and in their buttocks they have a little hole for making “poo-poo”. The rest of the story tells about the child’s potty training process.

In the original Hebrew edition, after the child uses the potty for the first time, he or she says "Bye-bye, wee-wee, bye-bye, poo-poo, see you on the seashore!" This line upset many environmentalists in Israel; When Shlomo Lahat, the mayor of Tel Aviv wrote to Frankel, offended, requesting that she remove the insult, she replied that if and after he cleans up the city beaches, she promised to remove it. At the time, there was a cholera outbreak from feces that were dumped into the sea. Years later, when the beaches were successfully cleaned, Frankel kept her word, instructing the publisher to remove those critical final words from the classic bestsellers. Regardless, the offending phrase is completely left off of other language publications of the book.
