= Lizzie Doron =

Israeli author

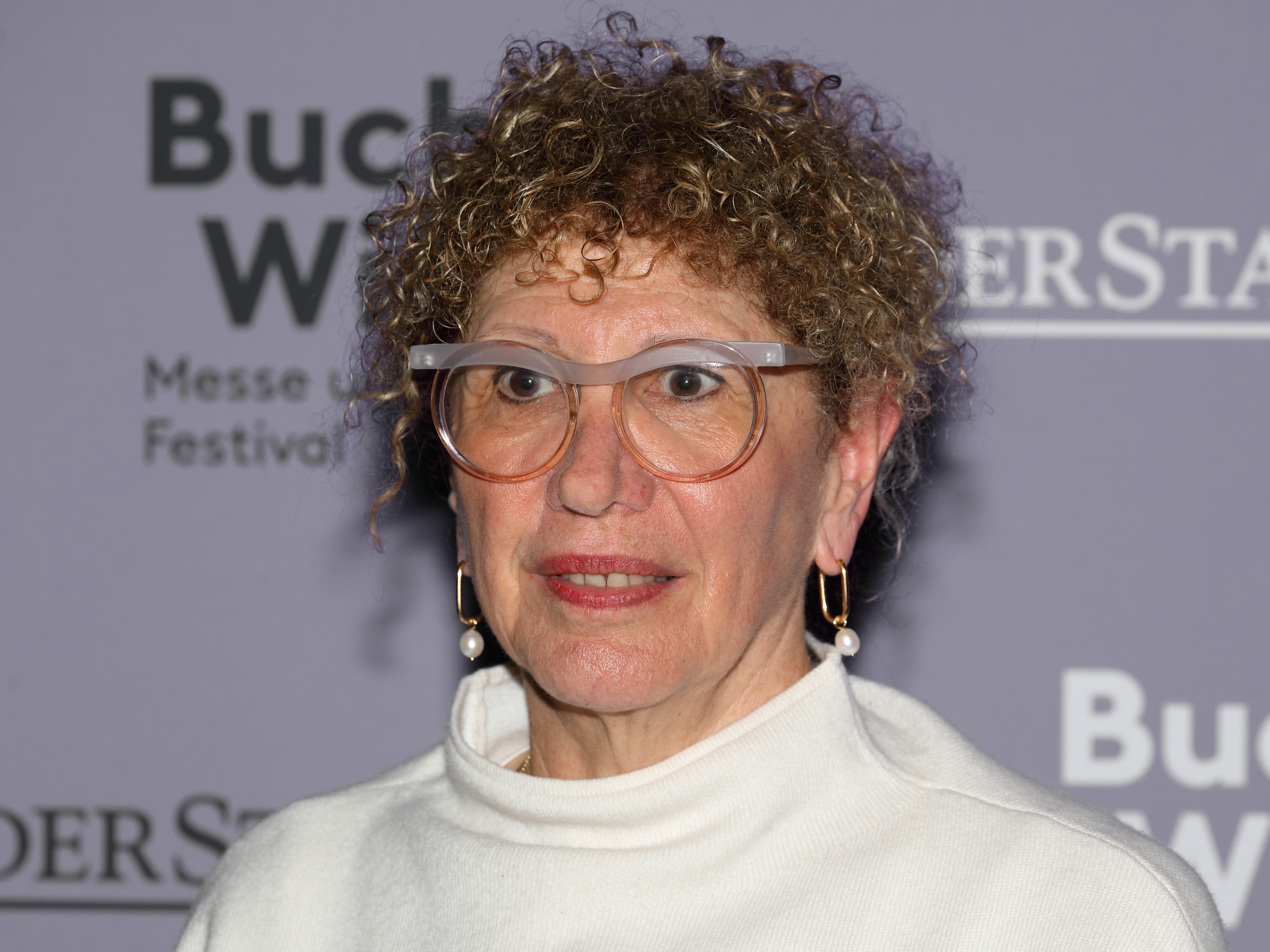
Lizzie Doron, 2025

Lizzie Doron (Hebrew: ליזי דורון; born 1953) is an Israeli author.

== Biography ==
Her mother was a German Holocaust survivor. Doron was born in Israel and served in the Israeli Defense Force. She also lived on a kibbutz. She eventually moved to Tel Aviv. One of her children now lives in Germany. Doron formerly worked as a linguist at the University of Tel Aviv. In the fall term of 2019 she was the twelfth Friedrich Dürrenmatt Guest Professor for World Literature at the University of Bern.

Doron writes about her family history, personal experiences and the Arab–Israeli conflict. Her book, "Peaceful Times", is about a woman living in Tel Aviv who forgets her childhood in World War II. Doron has also written about her changing views of the country.

== Positions ==
Doron said in a 2005 interview that she does not believe that the Arabs are Israel's main problem. One of her worries is the growing weight of religion in Israeli society. All this makes her pessimistic about the future, which has to be approached with radical openness and more detached from the traumas of the past.

== Awards and recognition ==
Other than in Germany and Switzerland, as of 2008, Doron's recognition in Israel had still been modest.

- Buchman Prize by Yad Vashem Holocaust Martyrs and Heroes Remembrance Authority (2003)
- Jeanette Schocken Prize – Bremerhaven Citizens' Prize for Literature for her entire oeuvre (2007)
- Her book Once There Was A Family was chosen among the 30 best books of 2007 by the Swiss newspaper Neue Zurcher Zeitung
- Kugel Prize for literature, awarded by the Municipality of Holon (2010)
