= Monument to the children in Yad Vashem =

Architectural structure in Israel

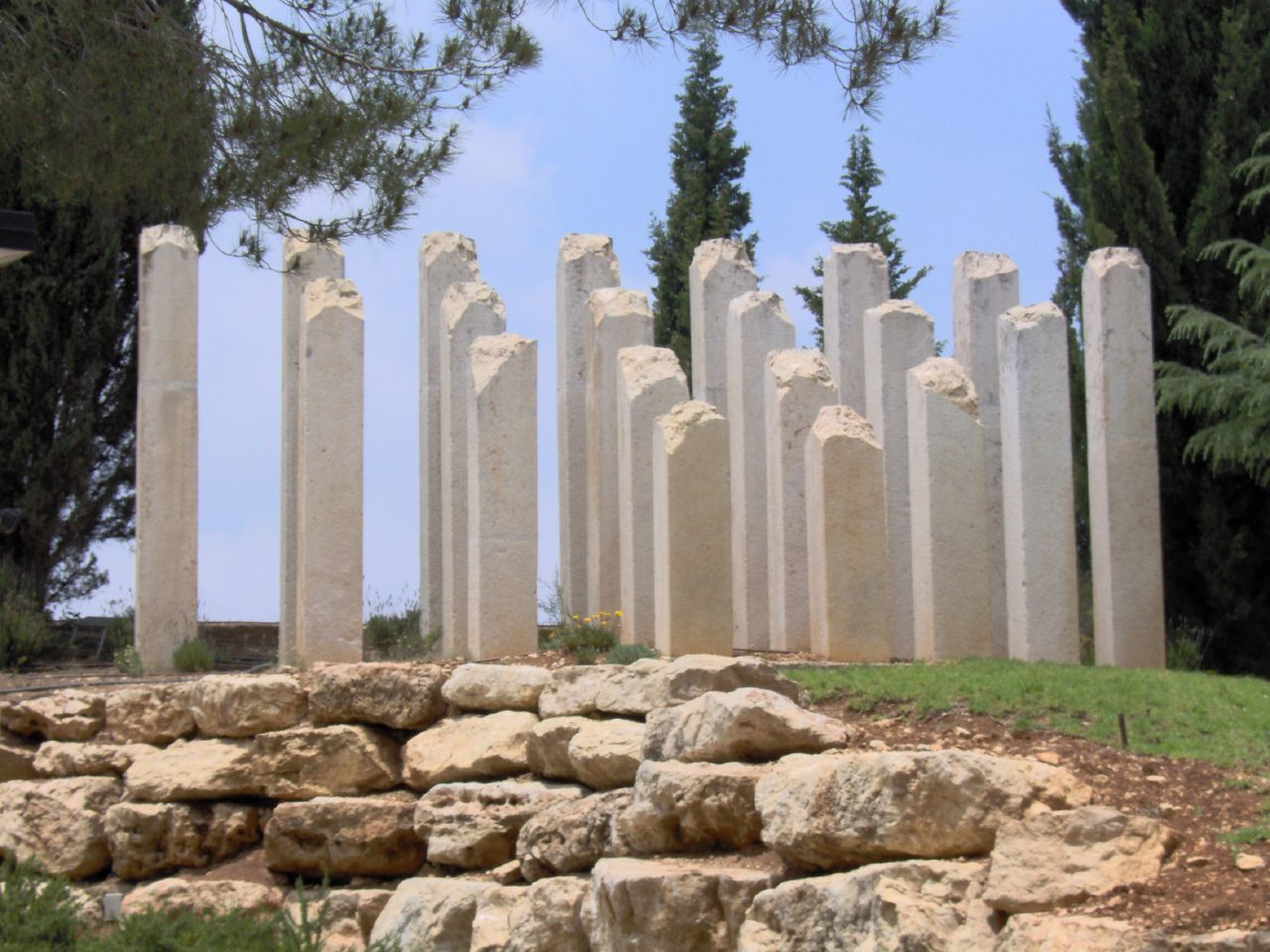
The demolished stelae, a monument to the children killed by the Nazis

Logo of the Yad Vashem memorial

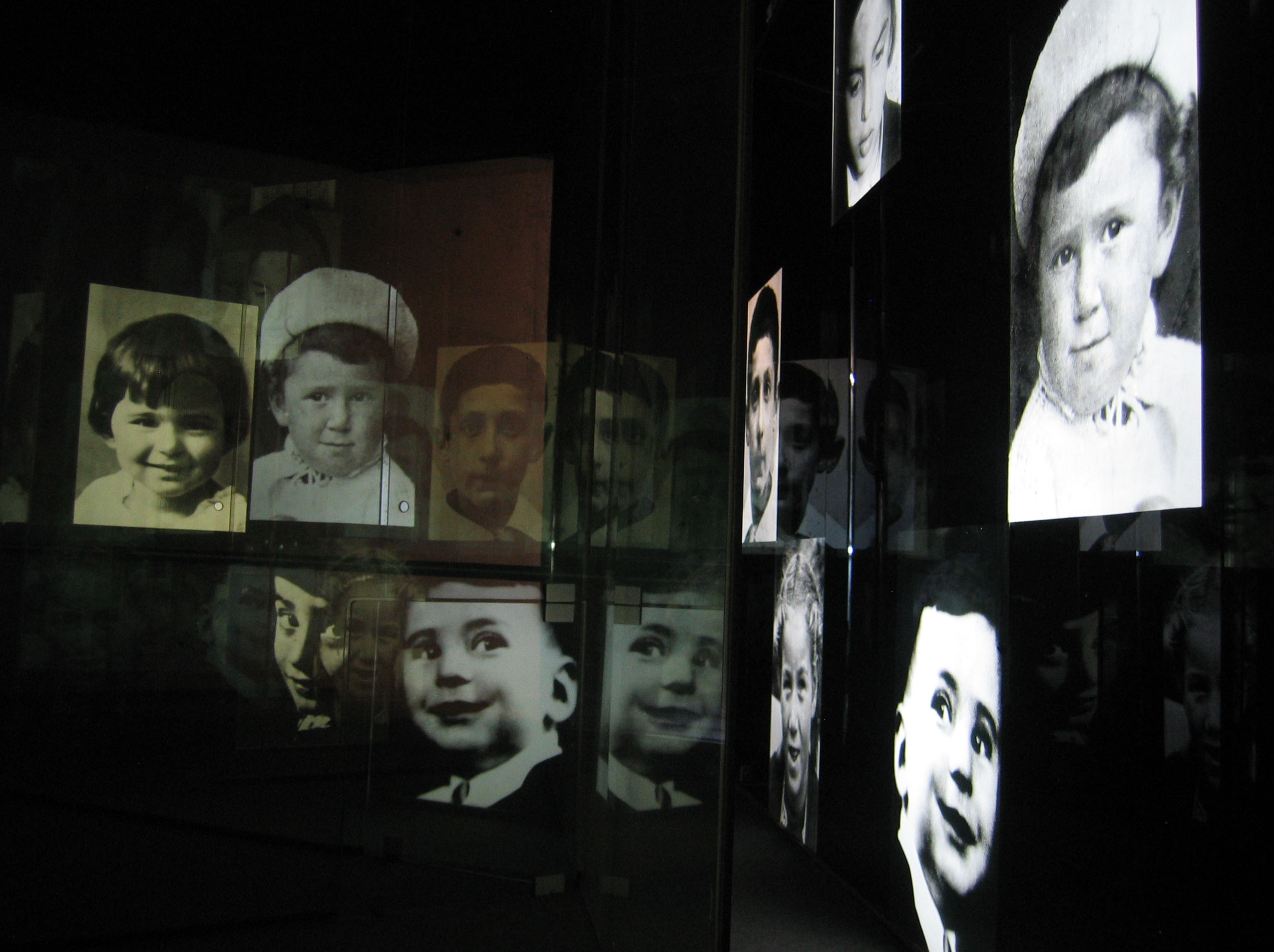
Pictures of the murdered children in Yad Vashem

The Monument to the children in Yad Vashem is located at Yad Vashem, the Israel's Holocaust authority in Jerusalem. It was erected in 1987 in remembrance of children killed during the reign of the Nazi Party in the German Reich.

In the memorial's entrance area, there are several white, broken-off stelae of different heights as a symbol for the lives broken off by the Nazis.

The main room of the memorial is completely mirrored and reflects the light of five candles. The reflection of these lights produces the illusion of space, which symbolizes the approximately 1.5 million children and young people who died during the Holocaust.

As spectators move through the room in the sparse light of the candles, names of the deceased children and adolescents, with their age and place of death, are recited by a looped tape recording. The recording takes about three months to list all the casualties.

The name of the monument, Yad Vashem (Hebrew יד ושם for "monument and name"), comes from Isaiah 56:5, Luther Bible: "To all of them I erect a monument in my house and in my walls, I give them a name worth more than sons and daughters: I give them an eternal name that will never be erased".
