= Gathering the Fragments =

Campaign to collect personal artifacts from the Holocaust

Gathering the Fragments is the name of a campaign organized by Yad Vashem to collect personal artifacts from the years before World War II, during the Holocaust, from life in the DP camps, and the immediate post-war period.

Items being collected include memoirs, testimonies, names, film and video footage, artworks, letters, documents, artifacts, diaries, and photographs. 71,000 such items have been donated to Yad Vashem during the campaign.

An exhibition showcasing the campaign and some of the items collected opened at Yad Vashem on International Holocaust Remembrance Day in 2013.
