= Page of Testimony =

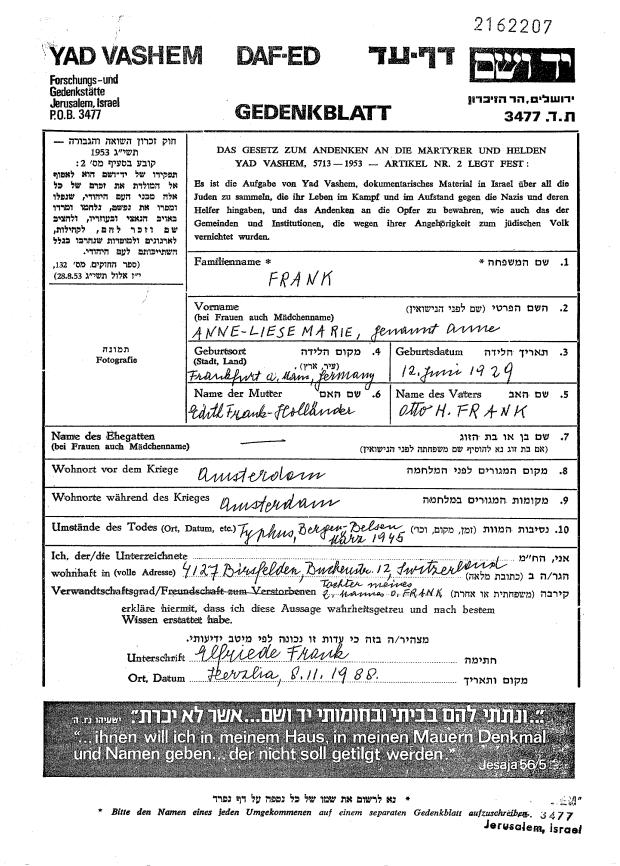
A Page of Testimony for Anne Frank

A Page of Testimony (Hebrew: דף עד) is a form issued by Yad Vashem (יד ושם) that asks for information about a Jewish victim of the Holocaust. Over 4.3 million Pages of Testimony have been submitted to Yad Vashem, beginning in the 1950s. Most of these, as well as other forms of documentation of Holocaust victims, are searchable and viewable online through Yad Vashem's Central Database of Shoah Victims' Names.

Pages of Testimony can be submitted online, or downloaded, printed, and mailed to Yad Vashem. Downloadable forms are available in English, Hebrew, Russian, French, German, Spanish, Portuguese, Romanian, Hungarian, and Dutch. Though many Pages of Testimony are submitted by relatives of the victims, anyone can submit a Page of Testimony about any victim.

Through its Names Recovery Project, Yad Vashem actively solicits help collecting new Pages of Testimony, and provides resources for community outreach.

Details provided on Pages of Testimony vary, but can include genealogical, residential, occupational, and wartime information about the victims. Submitters are named and their relationships to the victims, contact information (on the date of submission), and wartime status are sometimes recorded.

== Genealogical use ==
Because of the extensive genealogical information often included on Pages of Testimony, the fact that the submitters were often related to the victims, and the large number of Pages of Testimony that have been collected, the Central Database of Shoah Victims' Names is frequently used by Jewish genealogists and others searching for living relatives. As recently as 2006, siblings separated since World War II found each other through Page of Testimony research. However, Yad Vashem's purpose in collecting Pages of Testimony is not genealogical, but commemorative. A non-commercial website unaffiliated with Yad Vashem, ShoahConnect.org, facilitates such Page of Testimony research by enabling email addresses to be associated with Pages of Testimony, and matching people associated with the same Pages.
