= Yad Vashem =

Israel's official memorial to the Jewish victims of the Holocaust

- יָד וָשֵׁם

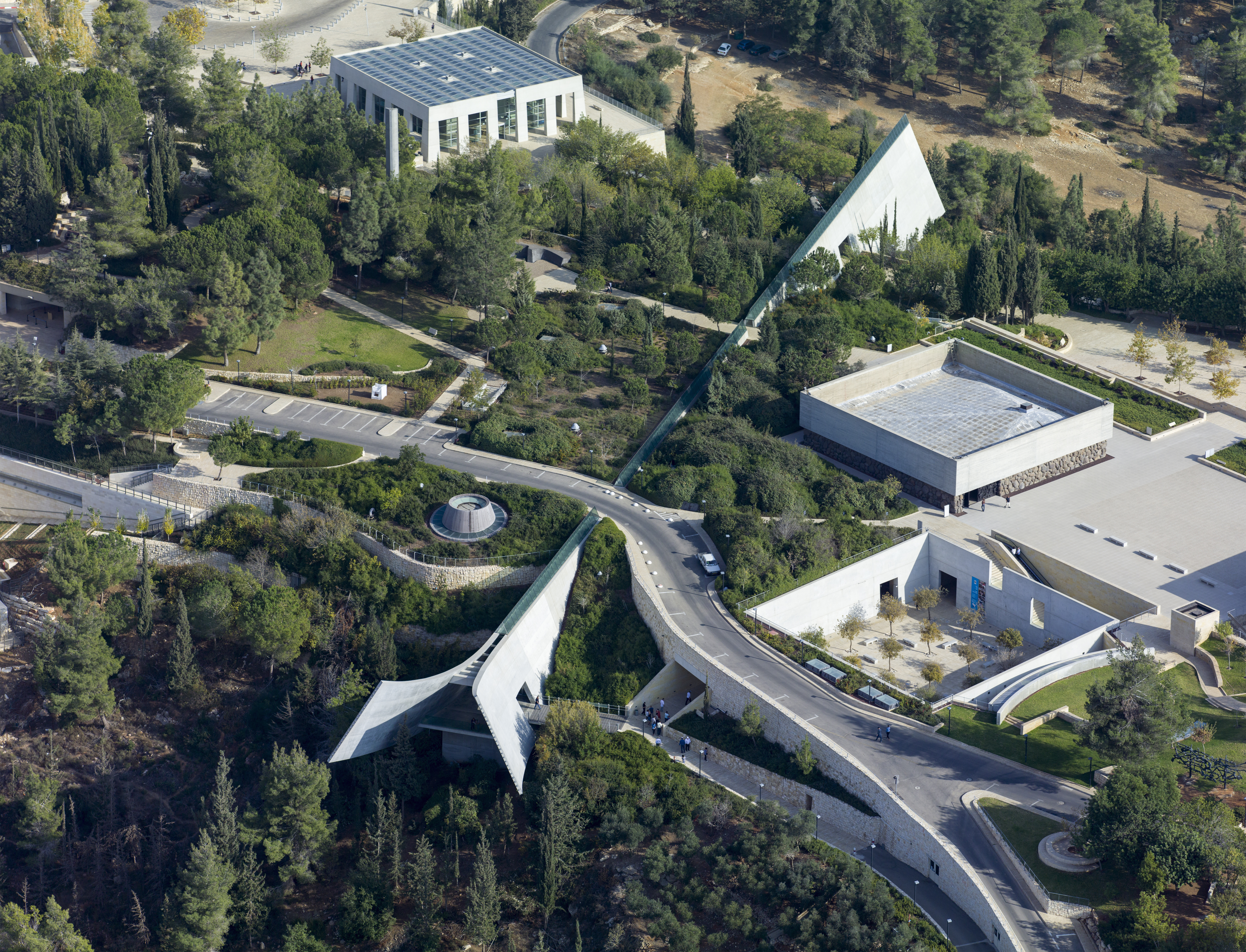
- Aerial view of Yad Vashem
- Established: 19 August 1953
- Location: On the western slope of Mount Herzl, also known as the Mount of Remembrance, a height in western Jerusalem, Israel
- Coordinates: 31°46′27″N 35°10′32″E
- Type: Israel's official memorial to the victims of the Holocaust
- Visitors: about 925,000 (2017), 800,000 (2016 and 2015)
- Public transit access: Mt Herzl (JLR Red Line)
- Website: www.yadvashem.org

Yad Vashem (Hebrew: יָד וָשֵׁם, lit. 'a memorial and a name') is Israel's official memorial institution to the victims of the Holocaust, known in Hebrew as the Shoah (שואה). It is dedicated to preserving the memory of the Jews who were murdered; echoing the stories of the survivors; honoring Jews who fought against their Nazi oppressors and gentiles who selflessly aided Jews in need; and researching the phenomenon of the Holocaust in particular and genocide in general, with the aim of avoiding such events in the future. Yad Vashem's vision, as stated on its website, is: "To lead the documentation, research, education and commemoration of the Holocaust, and to convey the chronicles of this singular Jewish and human event to every person in Israel, to the Jewish people, and to every significant and relevant audience worldwide."

Established by the Knesset in 1953, Yad Vashem is located on the Mount of Remembrance, on the western slope of Mount Herzl, a height in western Jerusalem, 804 meters (2,638 ft) above sea level and adjacent to the Jerusalem Forest. The memorial consists of a 180-dunam (18.0 ha; 44.5-acre) complex containing two types of facilities: some dedicated to the scientific study of the Holocaust, and memorials and museums serving the needs of the wider public. Among the former are an International Research Institute for Holocaust Research, an archives, a library, a publishing house and the International School for Holocaust Studies; the latter include the Holocaust History Museum, memorial sites such as the Children's Memorial and the Hall of Remembrance, the Museum of Holocaust Art, sculptures, outdoor commemorative sites such as the Valley of the Communities, as well as a synagogue.

A core goal of Yad Vashem's founders was to recognize non-Jews who, at personal risk and without financial or evangelistic motives, chose to save Jews from the ongoing genocide during the Holocaust. Those recognized by Israel as Righteous Among the Nations are honored in a section of Yad Vashem known as the Garden of the Righteous Among the Nations and in the Avenue of the Righteous.

Yad Vashem is the second-most-visited Israeli tourist site, after the Western Wall, with approximately one million visitors each year. It charges no admission fee.

== Etymology ==
The name "Yad Vashem" is taken from a verse in the Book of Isaiah (56:5): "[To] them will I give in my house and within my walls a [memorial] and a [name], better than sons and daughters; I will give them an everlasting [name], that shall not be cut off [from memory]." Hebrew: וְנָתַתִּי לָהֶם בְּבֵיתִי וּבְחוֹמֹתַי יָד וָשֵׁם, טוֹב מִבָּנִים וּמִבָּנוֹת; שֵׁם עוֹלָם אֶתֶּן לוֹ, אֲשֶׁר לֹא יִכָּרֵת.). Naming the Holocaust memorial "yad vashem" (Hebrew: יָד וָשֵׁם, yād wā-šêm, literally "a memorial and a name") conveys the idea of establishing a national depository for the names of Jewish victims who have no one to carry their name after death. The original verse referred to eunuchs who, although they could not have children, could still live for eternity with the Lord.

== History ==
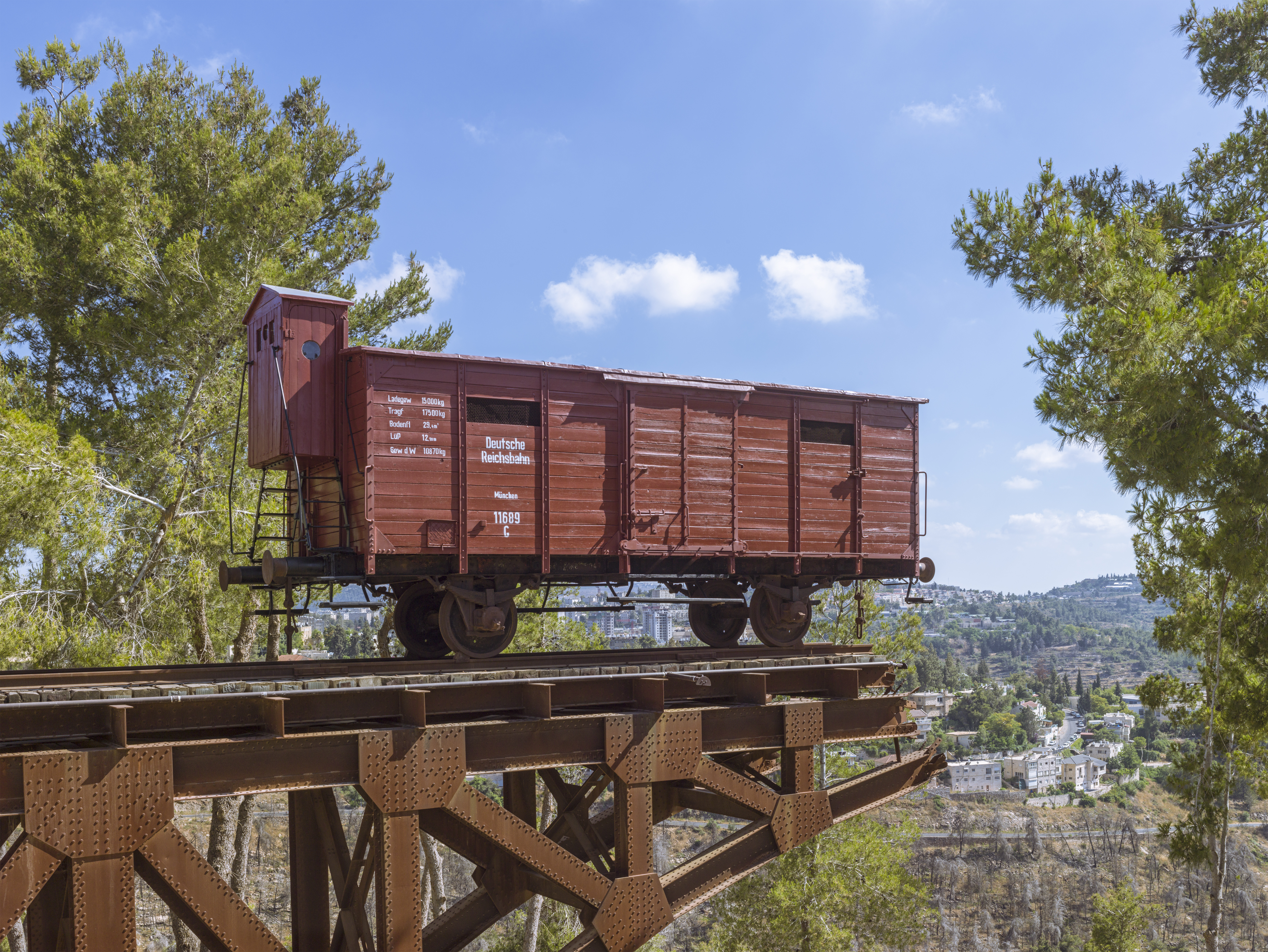
The wagon (or cattle car) monument in memory of those deported by rail

The desire to establish a memorial in the historical Jewish homeland for Jewish victims of the Nazi Holocaust originated during World War II, in response to emerging accounts of the mass murder of Jews in Nazi-occupied countries. Yad Vashem was first proposed in September 1942, at a board meeting of the Jewish National Fund, by Mordecai Shenhavi, a member of Kibbutz Mishmar Ha'emek. In August 1945, the plan was discussed in greater detail at a Zionist meeting in London. A provisional board of Zionist leaders was established that included David Remez as chairman, Shlomo Zalman Shragai, Baruch Zuckerman, and Shenhavi. In February 1946, Yad Vashem opened an office in Jerusalem and a branch office in Tel Aviv, and in June that year convened its first plenary session. In July 1947, the First Conference on Holocaust Research was held at the Hebrew University of Jerusalem. However, the outbreak of the 1947–1949 Palestine war brought operations to a standstill for two years.

On 19 August 1953, the Knesset, Israel's Parliament, unanimously passed the Yad Vashem Law, establishing the Holocaust Martyrs' and Heroes' Remembrance Authority, the aim of which was "the commemoration in the Homeland of all those members of the Jewish people who gave their lives, or rose up and fought the Nazi enemy and its collaborators," and to set up "a memorial to them, and to the communities, organizations and institutions that were destroyed because they belonged to the Jewish people."

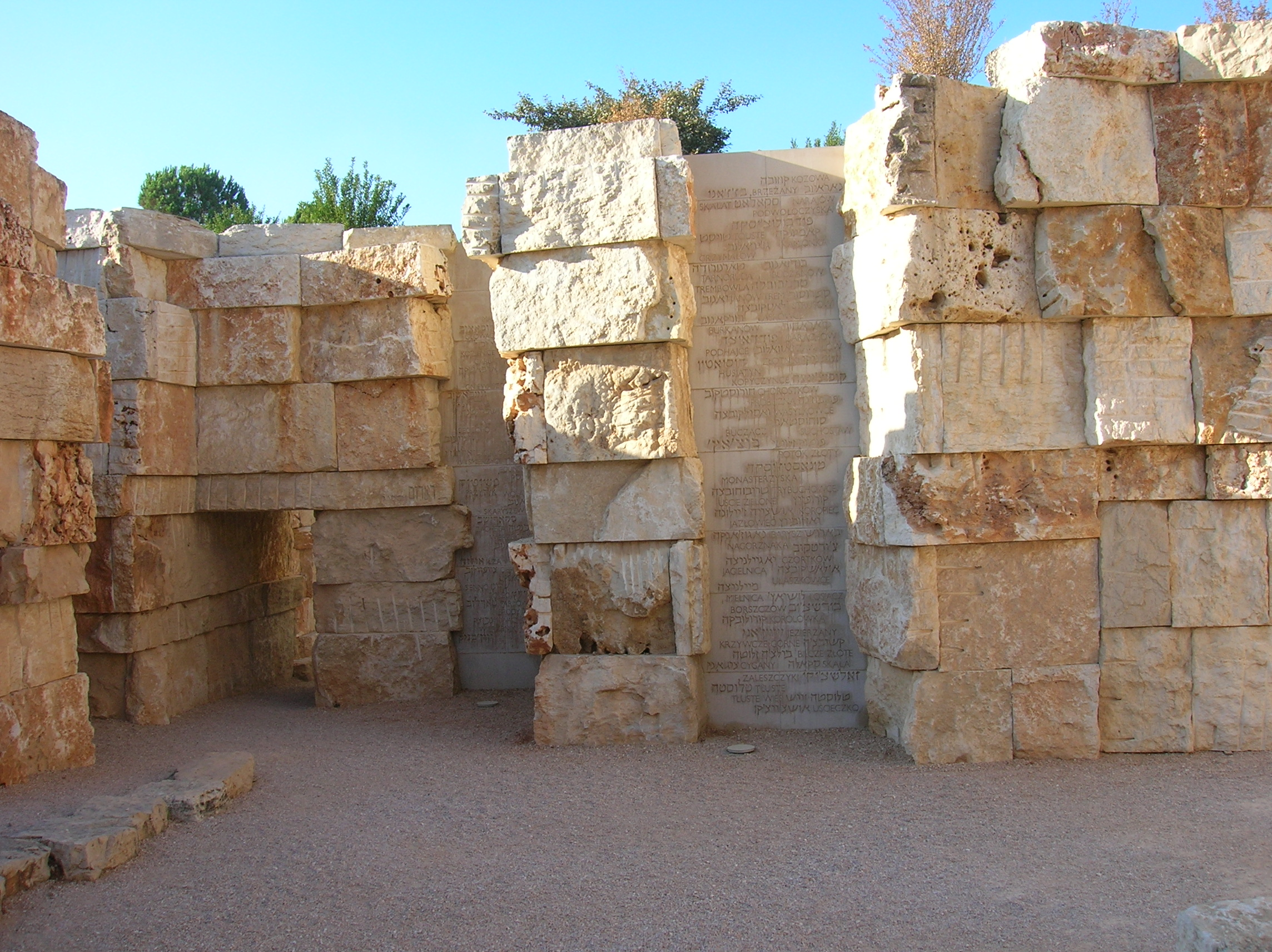
Valley of the (Destroyed) Communities

On 29 July 1954, the cornerstone for the Yad Vashem building was laid on a hill in western Jerusalem, to be known as the Mount of Remembrance (Hebrew: Har HaZikaron); the organization had already begun projects to collect the names of individuals killed in the Holocaust; acquire Holocaust documentation and personal testimonies of survivors for the Archives and Library; and develop research and publications. The memorial and museum opened to the public in 1957.

The location of Yad Vashem on the western side of Mount Herzl. Some Israeli authors claimed that this area lacks weighty historical associations, distinct from the Chamber of the Holocaust, founded in 1948 on Mount Zion. However, it was actually built on Khirbet al-Hamama, which consititutes the agricultural lands of the Palestinian village Ayn Karim prior to the Nakba. This place was chosen because it was far from the Jerusalem city center, and the founders of the memorial site did not want to erect a grim, sorrowful memorial, amidst population concentration. The conceptual connection of "From Holocaust to Rebirth" was made only with hindsight: Only in 2003 the Connecting Path between Yad Vashem and the National Cemetery in Mount Herzl was created and paved. The "Valley of the Communities" monument at Yad Vashem commemorates over 5,000 Jewish communities destroyed or damaged during the Holocaust, the names of which are engraved on its towering walls. The position of Yad Vashem is that the Holocaust is incomparable to any other calamity previously inflicted on the Jewish people, and therefore the Holocaust cannot be regarded as a continuation of the death and destruction that plagued Jewish communities over the centuries, but rather as a unique phase in history, an unprecedented endeavor to totally annihilate the Jewish people.

In 1982, Yad Vashem sponsored the International Conference on Holocaust and Genocide, which included six presentations on the Armenian genocide. It later withdrew from the conference after threats by the Turkish government that Jewish lives would be put in danger if the conference went ahead.

On 15 March 2005, a new Museum complex four times larger than the old one opened at Yad Vashem. It included the Holocaust History Museum with a new Hall of Names, a Museum of Holocaust Art, an Exhibitions Pavilion, a Learning Center and a Visual Center. The new Yad Vashem museum was designed by Israeli-Canadian architect Moshe Safdie, replacing the previous 30-year-old exhibition. It was the culmination of a $100 million decade-long expansion project.

== Administration ==
In November 2008, Rabbi Yisrael Meir Lau was appointed chairman of Yad Vashem's council, replacing Tommy Lapid. The vice chairman of the council is Moshe Kantor. Yitzhak Arad was vice chairman until his death on 6 May 2021. Elie Wiesel was vice chairman of the council until his death on 2 July 2016.

Yitzhak Arad served as the chairman of the directorate from 1972 to 1993. He was succeeded by Avner Shalev, who served as chairman until February 2021. Shalev was succeeded as chairman by Dani Dayan in August 2021.

The members of the Yad Vashem directorate are Yossi Ahimeir, Daniel Atar, Michal Cohen, Avraham Duvdevani, Boleslaw (Bolek) Goldman, Vera H. Golovensky, Shlomit Kasirer, Yossi Katribas, Yehiel Leket, Dalit Stauber, Zehava Tanne, Shoshana Weinshall, and Dudi Zilbershlag. Former deceased members were Matityahu Drobles, Moshe Ha-Elion, and Baruch Shub.

The CEO is Tzvika Fayirizen. The Director of the International Institute for Holocaust Research was Iael Nidam-Orvieto who was replaced by Dr. Roni Mikel-Arieli on the spring of 2026.The chair for Holocaust studies is Dan Michman, and Prof. Dina Porat is Senior Academic Advisor. She also served as Chief Historian between the years 2011–2022. Prior to that, Prof. Yehuda Bauer had that position.

== Objectives ==
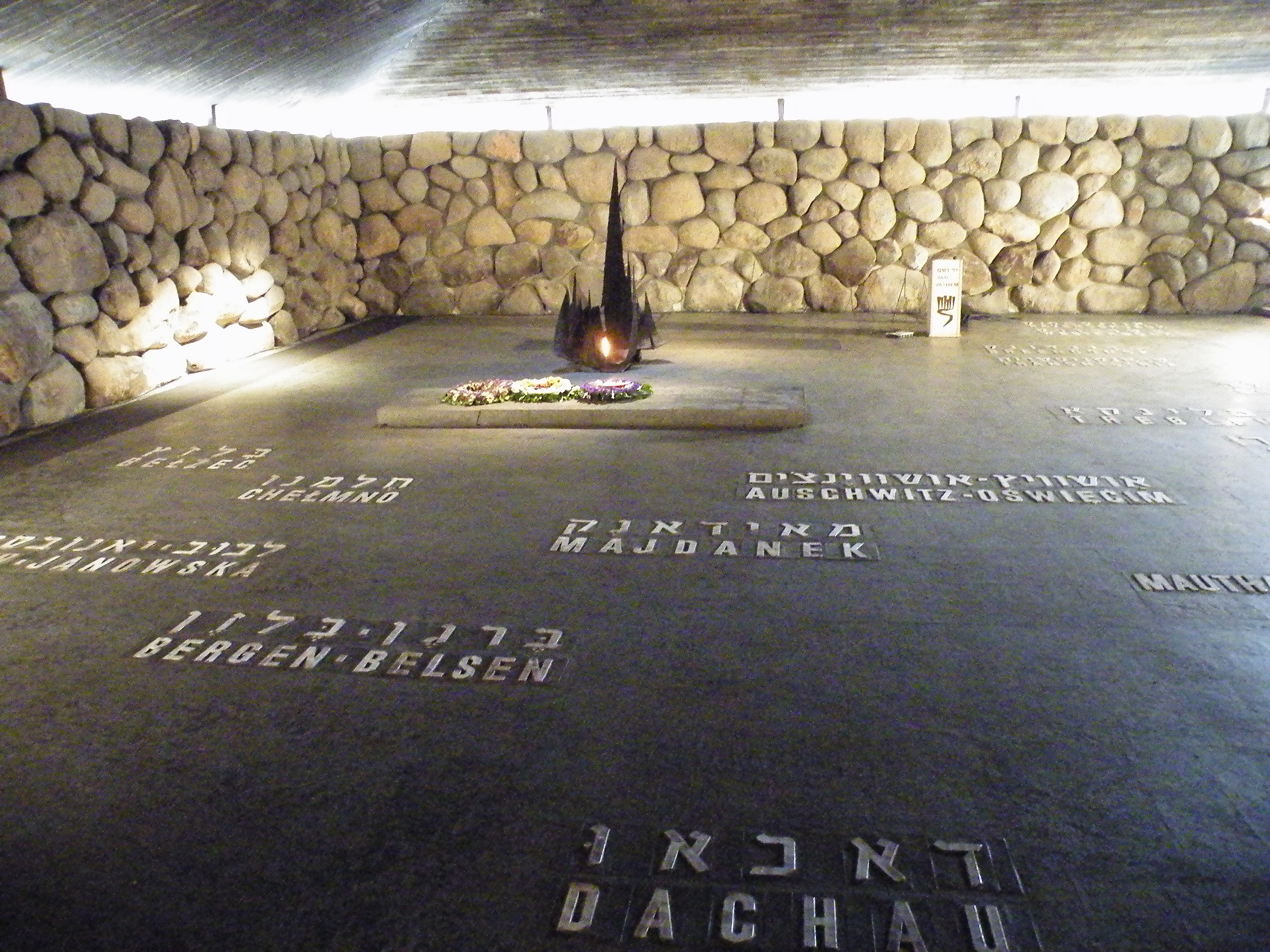
The eternal flame

The aims of Yad Vashem are education, research and documentation, and commemoration. Yad Vashem organizes professional development courses for educators both in Israel and throughout the world; develops age-appropriate study programs, curricula, and educational materials for Israeli and foreign schools in order to teach students of all ages about the Holocaust; holds exhibitions about the Holocaust; collects the names of Holocaust victims; collects photos, documents, and personal artifacts; and collects Pages of Testimony memorializing victims of the Holocaust. Yad Vashem seeks to preserve the memory and names of the six million Jews murdered during the Holocaust, and the numerous Jewish communities destroyed during that time. It holds ceremonies of remembrance and commemoration; supports Holocaust research projects; develops and coordinates symposia, workshops, and international conferences; and publishes research, memoirs, documents, albums, and diaries related to the Holocaust. Yad Vashem also honors non-Jews who risked their lives to save Jews during the Holocaust.

The International Institute for Holocaust Studies at Yad Vashem, founded in 1993, offers guides and seminars for students, teachers, and educators, and develops pedagogic tools for use in the classroom. Yad Vashem trains thousands of domestic and foreign teachers every year.

Yad Vashem operates a web site in several languages, including English, German, Hebrew, Persian, French, Russian, Spanish and Arabic. In 2013, Yad Vashem launched an online campaign in Arabic, promoting Yad Vashem's website. The campaign reached over 2.4 million Arabic speakers from around the globe, and the traffic to Yad Vashem's website was tripled.

The institution's policy is that the Holocaust "cannot be compared to any other event". In 2009 Yad Vashem fired a docent for comparing the trauma Jews suffered in the Holocaust to the trauma Palestinians suffered during 1947–1949 Palestine war, including the Deir Yassin massacre.

=== Yad Vashem Studies ===
Yad Vashem Studies is a peer-reviewed semi-annual scholarly journal on the Holocaust. Published since 1957, it appears in both English and Hebrew editions.

== Museum ==
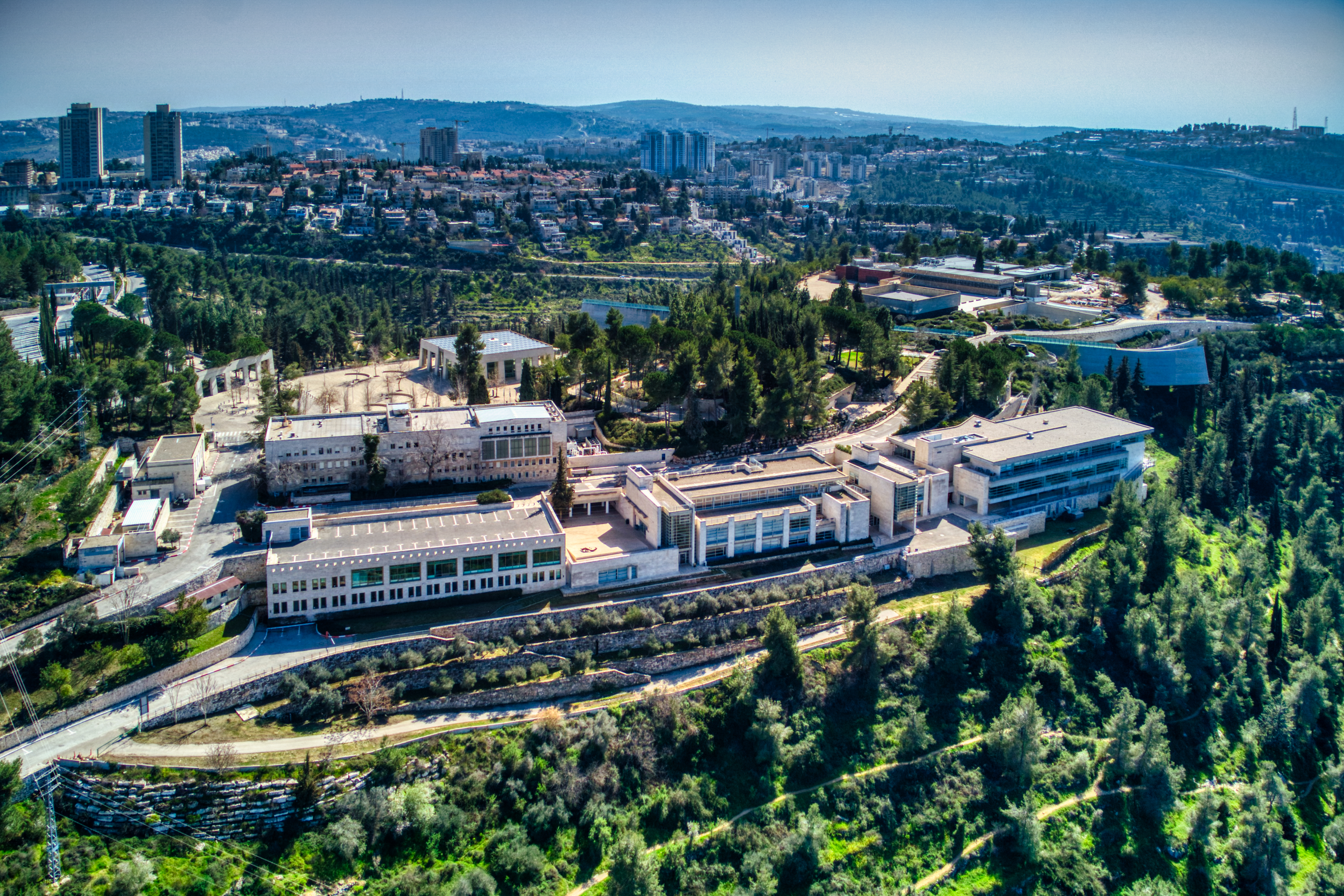
View of Yad Vashem

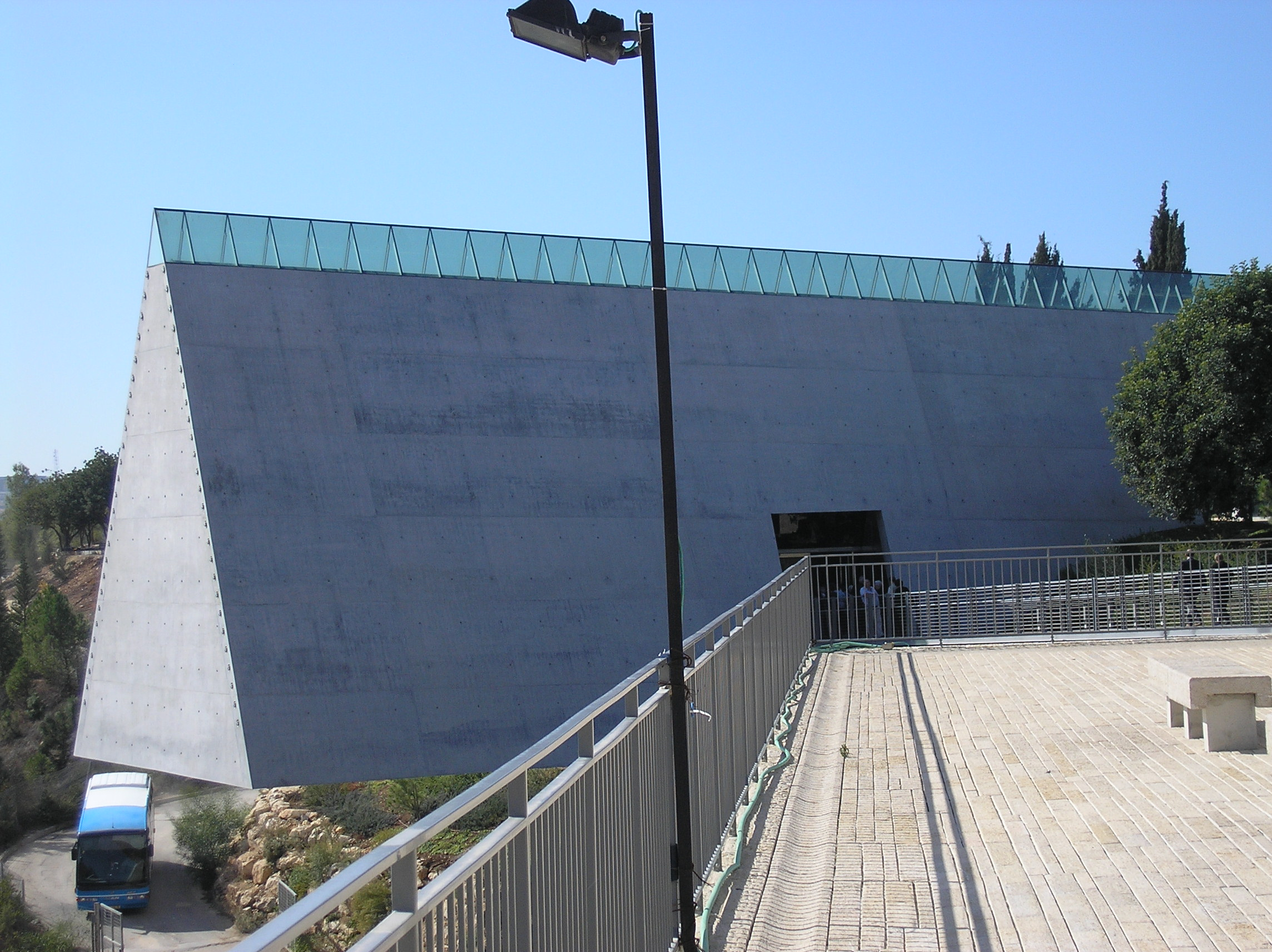
Yad Vashem Holocaust Museum

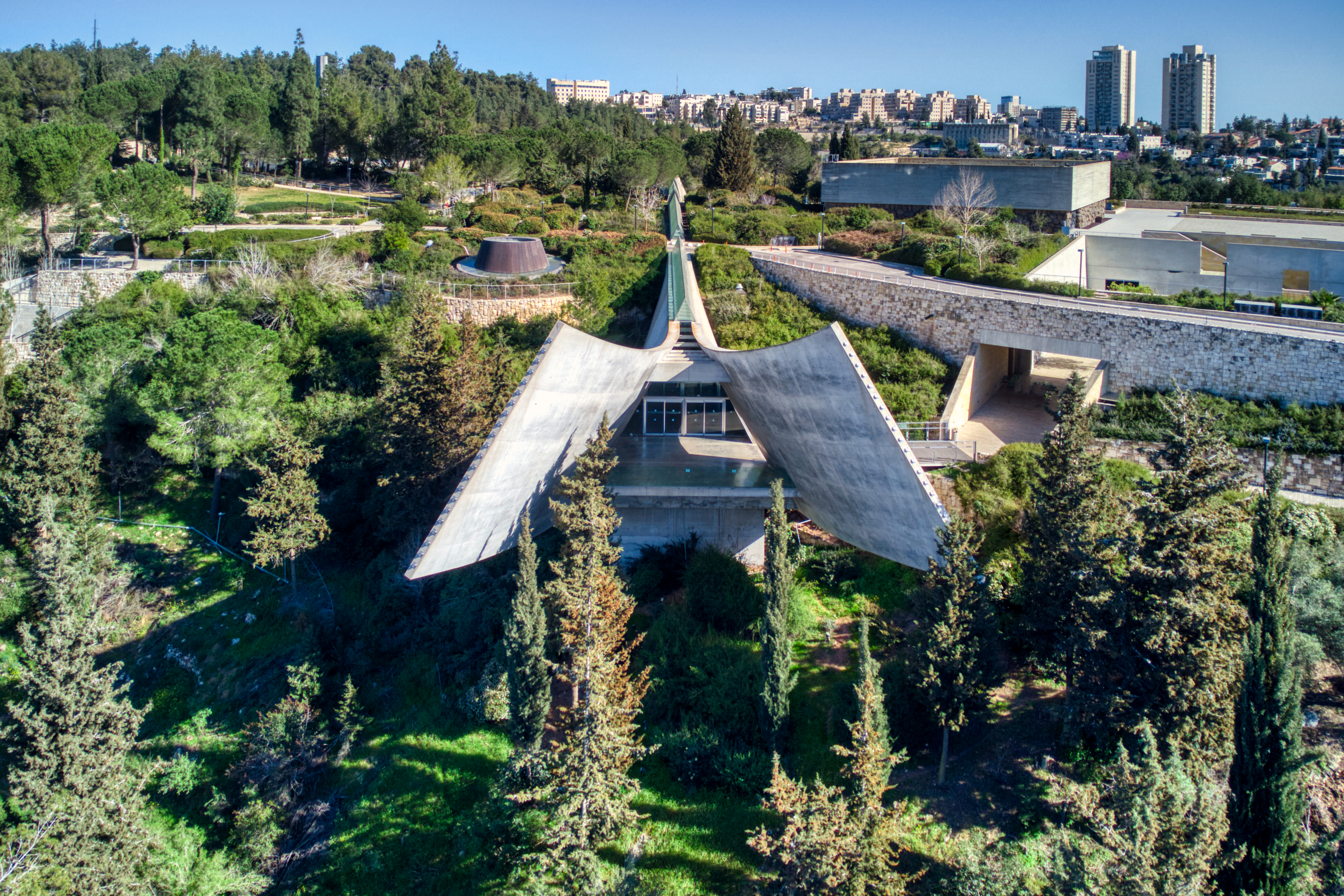
Exterior of the new Holocaust History Museum

Yad Vashem building on the Mount of Remembrance was inaugurated in 1957. Its first exhibits, opened on 1958, focused on documentation of the Holocaust. The second exhibition, opened in 1959, presented paintings from the Holocaust Ghettos and camps.

The first Holocaust History Museum at Yad Vashem was opened in 1973. It remained in operation until it was replaced by the new Holocaust History Museum, inaugurated in 2005.

In 1993, planning began for a larger, more technologically advanced museum to replace the old one. The new building, designed by Canadian-Israeli architect Moshe Safdie, consists of a long corridor connected to 10 exhibition halls, each dedicated to a different chapter of the Holocaust. The museum combines the personal stories of 90 Holocaust victims and survivors and presents approximately 2,500 personal items, including artwork and letters donated by survivors and others. The old historical displays revolving around antisemitism and the rise of Nazism have been replaced by exhibits that focus on the personal stories of Jews killed in the Holocaust. According to Avner Shalev, one of the museum's curators and the chairman of Yad Vashem authority at the time, a visit to the new museum revolves around "looking into the eyes of the individuals. There weren't six million victims, there were six million individual murders."

The new museum was dedicated on 15 March 2005 in the presence of leaders from 40 states and then Secretary General of the UN Kofi Annan. President of Israel Moshe Katzav said that Yad Vashem serves as "an important signpost to all of humankind, a signpost that warns how short the distance is between hatred and murder, between racism and genocide".

== Collections Center ==
In 2019, Yad Vashem began the construction of a new collection center to house and conserve millions of artifacts from the Holocaust.

In July 2024, Yad Vashem inaugurated the Moshal Shoah Legacy Campus. At its center stands the Shapell Family Collections Center, a state-of-the-art facility for the preservation, conservation, and research of Holocaust-era materials. The center houses hundreds of millions of items, including documents, photographs, artworks, artifacts, and Pages of Testimony. These materials are stored in advanced climate-controlled environments and supported by specialized conservation laboratories, ensuring their long-term preservation and accessibility for future research and commemoration.

== Architecture ==
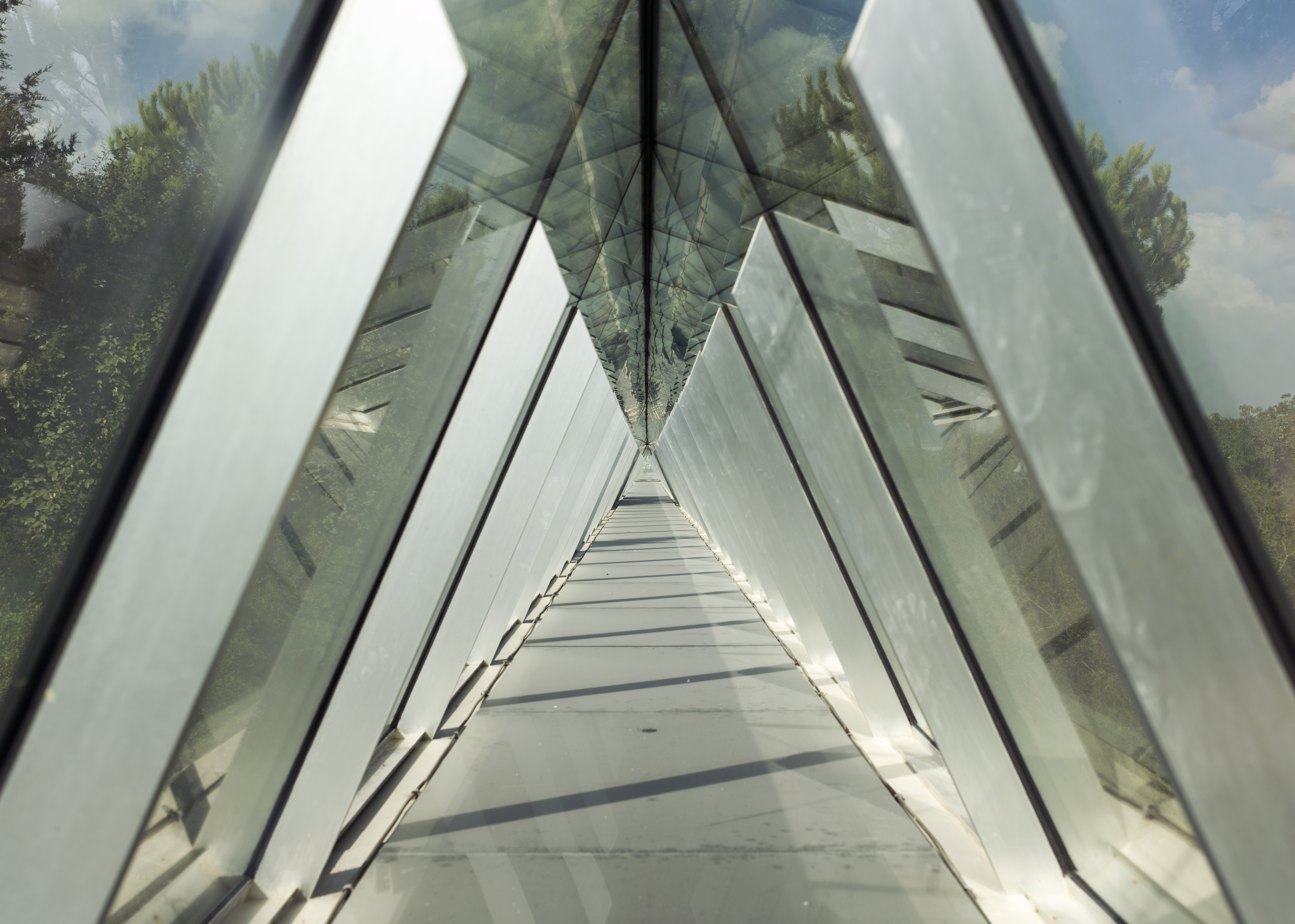
Prism skylight

The first architect involved in the design of Yad Vashem was Munio Weinraub, who worked on the project from 1943 till the 1960s, together with his architectural partner Al Mansfield. He was approached for this purpose by Mordechai Shenhavi, the initiator and first director of the institution. Weinraub's plans were not realised as a whole, but some of his ideas are visible in Yad Vashem today.

The new Holocaust History Museum, designed by Moshe Safdie, is shaped like a triangular concrete prism that cuts through the landscape, illuminated by a 200-meter-long (656 ft) skylight. Visitors follow a preset route that takes them through underground galleries that branch off from the main hall. Safdie is also the architect behind the Children's Memorial and the Deportees (cattle-car) Memorial.

The gates are the work of the sculptor David Palombo (1920–1966).

== Hall of Names ==
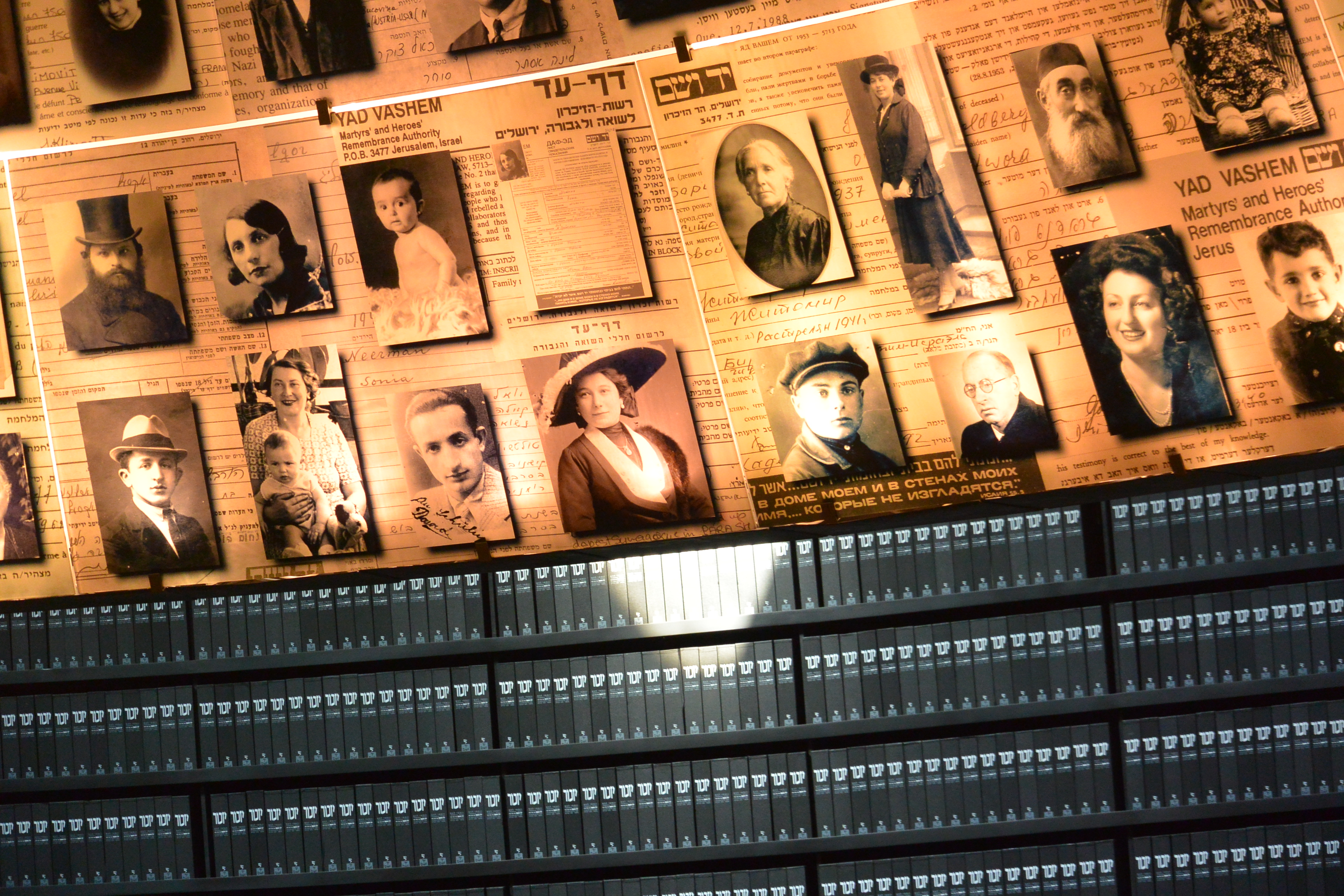
The Hall of Names containing Pages of Testimony commemorating the millions of Jews who were murdered during the Holocaust

The Hall of Names is a memorial to the six million Jews who were murdered in the Holocaust. The main hall is composed of two cones: one ten meters high, with a reciprocal well-like cone excavated into the underground rock, its base filled with water. On the upper cone is a display featuring 600 photographs of Holocaust victims and fragments of Pages of Testimony. These are reflected in the water at the bottom of the lower cone, commemorating those victims whose names remain unknown. Surrounding the platform is the circular repository, housing the approximately 2.8 million Pages of Testimony collected until November 2025, with empty spaces for those yet to be submitted.

Since the 1950s, Yad Vashem has collected approximately 125,000 audio, video, and written testimonies by Holocaust survivors. As the survivors age, the program has expanded to visiting survivors in their homes, to tape interviews. Adjoining the hall is a study area with a computerized data bank where visitors can do online searches for the names of Holocaust victims.

== Archives ==
The Archive is the oldest department of Yad Vashem. Before presenting an exhibition, Yad Vashem collects items. The best known of these are the historical photographs, as well as the Pages of Testimonies collected from survivors. The latter is a database of personal information about those who survived and those who were murdered in the Holocaust. Yad Vashem has also acquired access to the database of the International Tracing Service of Bad Arolsen of the International Committee of the Red Cross, and these two databases complement each other for research purposes.

== Righteous Among the Nations ==
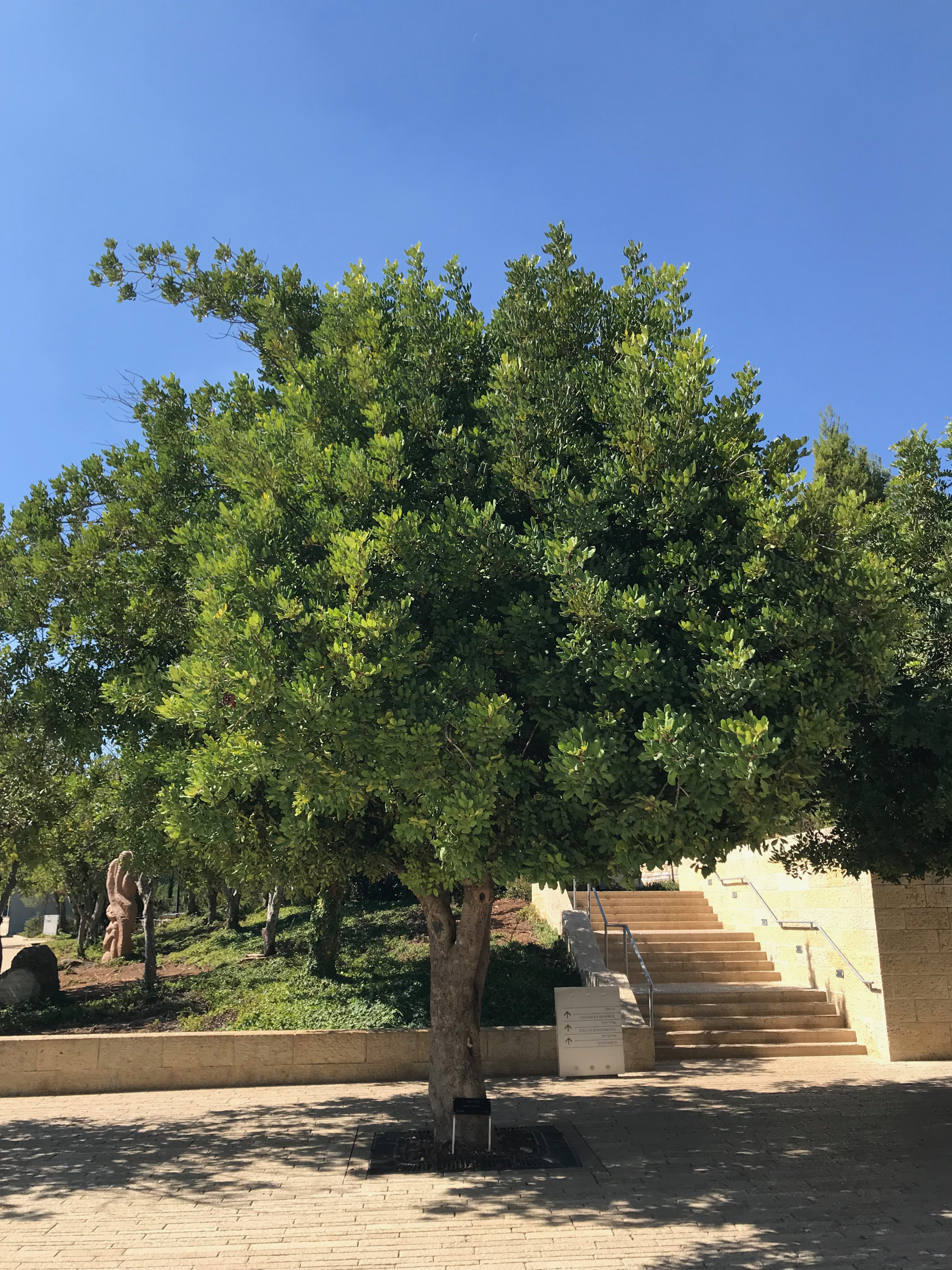
Tree, memorial honoring Irena Sendler (Polish social worker who smuggled more than 2,500 Jewish children out of the Warsaw Ghetto)

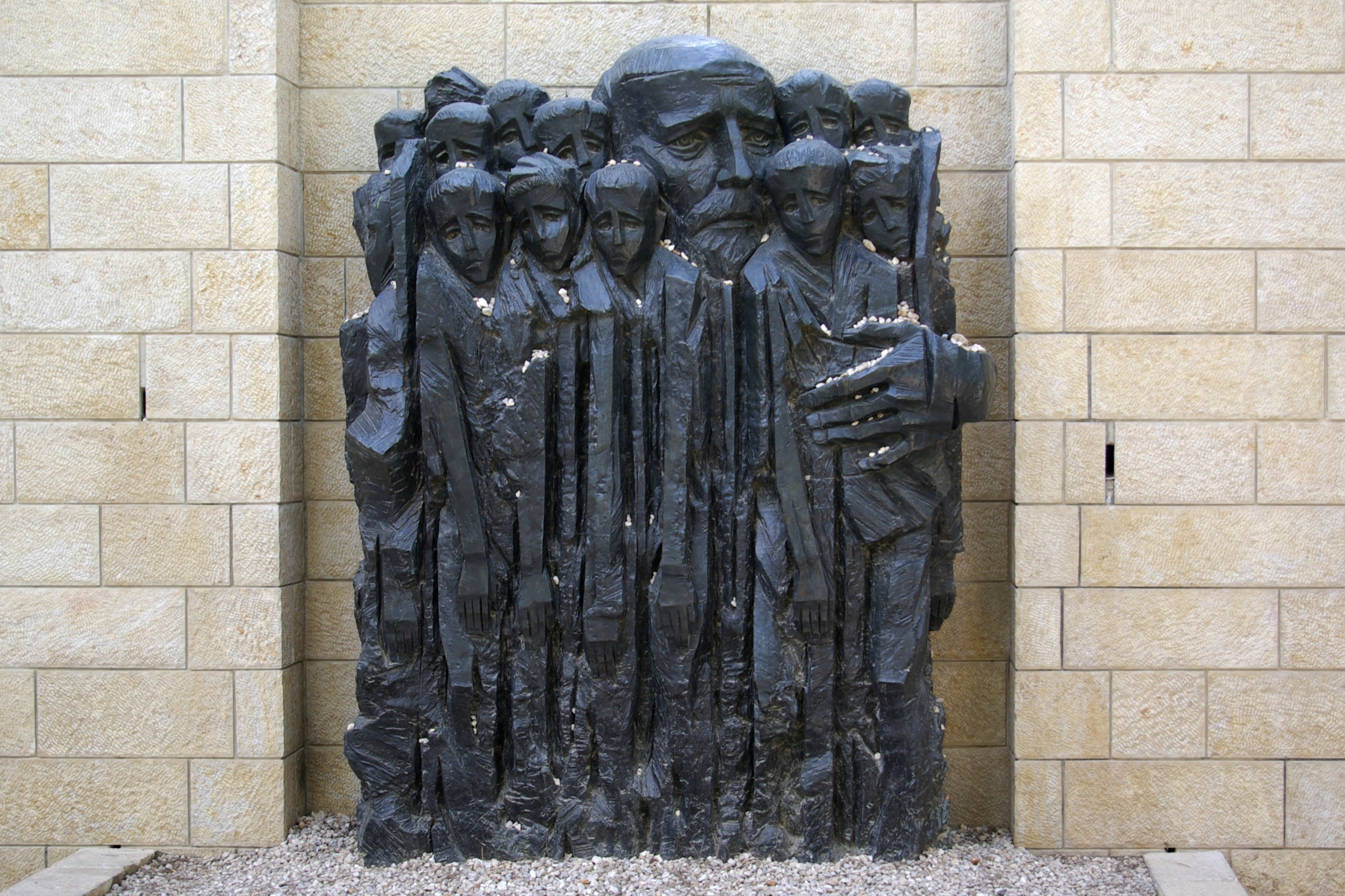
Janusz Korczak and the children, memorial

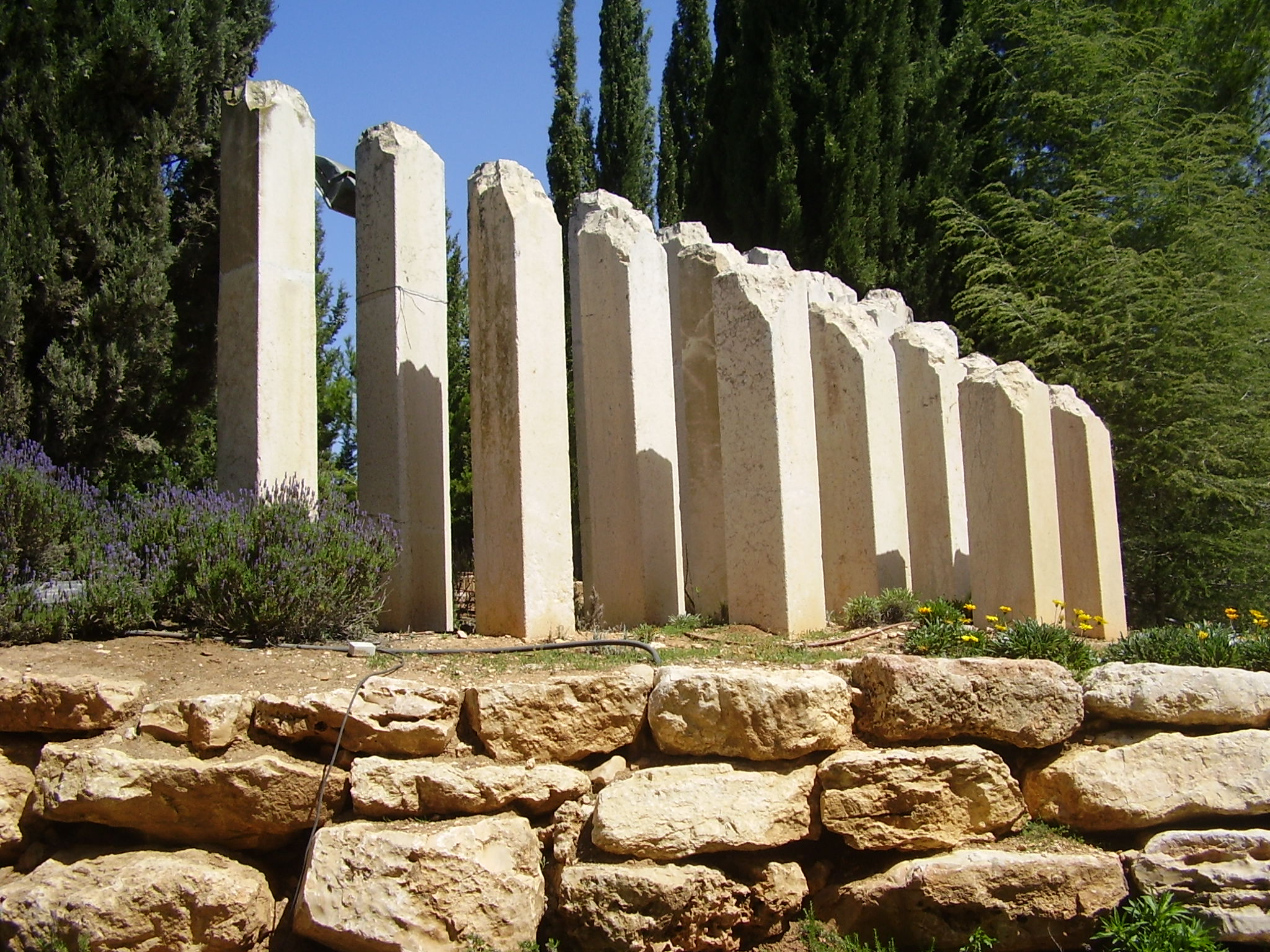
Memorial to the Jewish children murdered by the Nazis

One of Yad Vashem's tasks is to honor non-Jews who risked their lives, liberty, or positions to save Jews during the Holocaust. To this end, a special independent commission, headed by a retired Supreme Court justice, was established. The commission members, including historians, public figures, lawyers, and Holocaust survivors, examine and evaluate each case according to a well-defined set of criteria and regulations. The Righteous receive a certificate of honor and a medal, and their names are commemorated in the Garden of the Righteous Among the Nations, on the Mount of Remembrance, Yad Vashem. This is an ongoing project that will continue for as long as there are valid requests, substantiated by testimonies or documentation. Five hundred and fifty-five individuals were recognized during 2011, and as of 2024, 28,707 individuals have been recognized as Righteous Among the Nations.

Yad Vashem's declared policy is not to provide meaningful recognition, even in a possible new category, to Jews who rescued Jews, regardless of the number of people their activism saved. The stated reason is that Jews had an obligation to save fellow Jews and do not deserve recognition.

== Controversies ==
=== Ładoś Group ===
In April 2019, the Yad Vashem granted the title of Righteous Among the Nations to Konstanty Rokicki and offered "appreciation" to Aleksander Ładoś and Stefan Ryniewicz, arguing that Rokicki headed the Ładoś Group. The document erroneously called Ładoś and Ryniewicz "consuls". The decision sparked outrage and frustration among the family members of the two other late Polish diplomats, and among survivors. Thirty one of them signed an open letter to Yad Vashem. Rokicki's cousin refused to accept the medal until two other Polish diplomats, Rokicki's superior, are recognized as Righteous Among The Nations, too. Polish Ambassador to Switzerland Jakub Kumoch who contributed to the discovery of Rokicki also refuted the Yad Vashem's interpretation stating that Rokicki worked under Ładoś and Ryniewicz. Eldad Beck of Israel Hayom suggested that this decision was politically inspired and related to the worsening of Israel-Poland relations due to the controversy over the Amendment to the Act on the Institute of National Remembrance.

=== Political interference and leadership ===
In 2018, Yad Vashem chief historian Dina Porat participated in developing a compromise agreement between the Israeli and Polish governments about Poland's record during the Holocaust, and moderating a Polish law criminalizing any assertion of any Polish complicity in the Holocaust or other Nazi crimes. By agreement between the Israeli and Polish governments, the law was reworded to acknowledge some Polish misconduct, in exchange for a joint declaration by Polish government and Israeli Knesset that many Poles committed "heroic" efforts "to save Jewish people." However, the museum, itself, argued the declaration "contains highly problematic wording that contradicts existing and accepted historical knowledge in this field," and harshly disparaged the deal, saying the agreement would stifle free research about the subject.

In February 2020, Yad Vashem apologized for "inaccuracies" and "partial" facts that had been presented in Jerusalem at the previous month's World Holocaust Forum (attended by Russian president Vladimir Putin and other world leaders). The criticism alleged the program excessively emphasized Russia's role in ending World War II, and suppressed information unpalatable to Russia's government.

In 2020, plans to appoint Effi Eitam to head the institutions have been criticized due to alleged racist remarks made by the appointee.

In summer 2023, a number of scholars, politicians and media figures have criticized Israeli Prime Minister Benjamin Netanyahu and Education Minister Yoav Kisch for an attempt to remove Yad Vashem Chairman Dani Dayan from his position, noting that this reduces the independence and, hence, credibility of the institution.

=== Relationship to the Nakba ===
Yad Vashem was built on the territory of Ein Karim, a depopulated Palestinian village that had been inhabited by 3,500 Palestinian Christians who fled after the Deir Yassin massacre. According to Saree Makdisi, the hilltop campus of Yad Vashem, in ensemble with the Memorial Park and National Military Cemetery on Mount Herzl, burial site of Theodor Herzl, form "the most sacred monuments to Zionism." The complex overlooks the remains of the depopulated Palestinian village of Deir Yassin, site of the Deir Yassin massacre, which is not mentioned in the complex and which has been partially covered by the Jerusalem Forest and partially renovated and converted into the buildings of the Kfar Shaul Mental Health Center.

== Art gallery ==
Yad Vashem houses the world's largest collection of artwork produced by Jews and other victims of Nazi occupation in 1933–1945. The Yad Vashem Art Department supervises a 14,000-piece collection, adding 300 pieces a year, most of them donated by survivors' families or discovered in attics. Included in the collection are works by Alexander Bogen, Alice Lok Cahana, Samuel Bak, and Felix Nussbaum.

== Monuments at Yad Vashem ==
- The monument to the heroes of the Warsaw Ghetto Uprising by Nathan Rapoport, a version of the 1948 Monument to the Ghetto Heroes from Warsaw.
- Janusz Korczak and the Children, memorial to the educator and the children he refused to leave
- Memorial to the Jewish children murdered in the Holocaust
- The Memorial to the Deportees, aka "train monument", in memory of the Jews taken to the extermination camps by cattle cars
- Valley of the (Destroyed) Communities, in memory of the Jewish communities of Europe which ceased to exist after the Holocaust

== Prizes awarded by Yad Vashem ==
Yad Vashem awards the following book prizes:

- Yad Vashem Prize for Children's Holocaust Literature
- Yad Vashem International Book Prize for Holocaust Research, established in 2011 in memory of Abraham Meir Schwartzbaum, Holocaust survivor, and his family who was murdered in the Holocaust. Since 2018 the prize is awarded in memory of Benny and Tilly Joffe z"l, Holocaust survivors, and their family who was murdered in the Holocaust. It is awarded annually in recognition of high scholarly research and writing on the Holocaust.
- Sussman Prize for Paintings of the Shoah. Recipients include:
  - 1996: Aharon Gluska and Moshe Kupferman
- The annual Buchman Foundation Memorial Prize, for writers and scholars for Holocaust-related works. Recipients include:
  - 1990: Shmuel Spector and Shmuel Ben-Zion (literature)
  - 1995: Ida Fink (literature)
  - 1999: Lilian Atlan (literature)
  - 2000: Nahum Bogner (research)
  - 2001: Amir Gutfreund (literature)
  - 2002: Hanna Yablonka, for The State of Israel vs. Adolf Eichmann (Hebrew), and Arieh Kochavi, for Post-Holocaust Politics: Britain, The United States, and Jewish Refugees, 1945-1948
  - 2003: Lizzie Doron (literature)
  - 2004: Yitzhak Arad, for his book, The History of the Holocaust: Soviet Union and the Annexed Territories
  - 2005: Michal Unger (research), Alona Frankel (literature)
  - 2007: Hanoch Bartov, for Beyond the Horizon, Across the Street
  - 2007: Shlomo Aronson, for Hitler, the Allies and the Jews
  - Earlier: Aharon Appelfeld, Alona Frankel (2005), Ida Fink, Dina Porat, Lizzie Doron, Amir Gutfreund, and Itamar Levin.

== Awards bestowed upon Yad Vashem ==
- In 1973, the Pinkas HaKehillot (Encyclopedia of Jewish Communities) project of Yad Vashem was awarded the Israel Prize, for its special contribution to society and the State.
- In 2003, Yad Vashem was awarded the Israel Prize for lifetime achievement and its special contribution to society and the State.
- In September 2007, Yad Vashem received the Prince of Asturias Award for Concord. The Prince of Asturias Awards are presented in eight categories. The Award for Concord is bestowed upon a person, persons, or institution whose work has made an exemplary and outstanding contribution to mutual understanding and peaceful coexistence among men, to the struggle against injustice or ignorance, to the defense of freedom, or whose work has widened the horizons of knowledge or has been outstanding in protecting and preserving mankind's heritage.
- On 25 October 2007, Yad Vashem Chairman Avner Shalev was awarded the Légion d'honneur for his "extraordinary work on behalf of Holocaust remembrance worldwide." French President Nicolas Sarkozy presented Shalev with the award in a special ceremony at the Élysée Palace.
- In 2011, Shalev received the City of Jerusalem's Patron of Jerusalem Award in recognition of his work in the city.

== See also ==
- Gathering the Fragments – campaign by Yad Vashem
- International Holocaust Remembrance Day
- List of Israel Prize recipients
- List of Righteous Among the Nations by country
- The Holocaust History Project
- Yad Vashem: Preserving the Past to Ensure the Future
- Yom HaShoah – commemoration day in Israel

Similar institutions outside Israel

- Tsitsernakaberd – Armenian Genocide memorial complex est. in 1967 after a similar concept
- List of Holocaust memorials and museums
